= State Road 21 (Serbia) =

Road in Serbia

State Road 21
- Serbian: Državni put IB reda 21; Serbian Cyrillic: Државни пут IБ реда 21

Route information
- Part of E761 / E763 Požega – Požega (Arilje)
- Maintained by JP "Putevi Srbije"
- Length: 314.194 km (195.231 mi)

Major junctions
- From: Novi Sad 12
- 12 in Novi Sad; 100 in Novi Sad; 313 in Irig; 126 near Ruma; 120 near Ruma; A3 near Ruma; 316 in Jarak; 26 in Šabac; 140 near Vladimirci; 323 near Matijevac; 326 near Draginje; 142 in Draginje; 141 in Koceljeva; 341 in Družetić; 340 near Slatina; 27 in Valjevo; 176 in Valjevo; 175 near Divčibare; 174 in Kosjerić; 178 near Kalenići; 23 in Požega; A2 in Prilipac; 196 in Arilje; 194 in Prilike; 180 in Ivanjica; 30 in Ivanjica
- To: Sjenica 29

Location
- Country: Serbia
- Districts: South Bačka, Srem, Mačva, Kolubara, Moravica, Zlatibor

Highway system
- Roads in Serbia; Motorways
← 20	→ 22

State Road 21 is an IB-class road in northern and western Serbia, connecting Novi Sad with Sjenica. It is in Vojvodina and Šumadija and Western Serbia regions.

Before the new road categorization regulation given in 2013, the route had the following names: M 22.1, M 21, M 5, M 21.1 and P 117 (before 2012) / 13 and A4 (after 2012).

The existing route is a main road with two traffic lanes. By the valid Space Plan of Republic of Serbia the section between Novi Sad and Ruma would be upgraded to expressway, while the Požega-Sjenica part would be transferred to the new A2 motorway, providing the faster link between A1 and A3 motorways, also between Belgrade and Montenegrin coast, respectively. Everything is expected to be completed by 2020.

Section from Požega to Požega (Arilje) is a part of European routes E761 and E763.

== Planned motorways and exprssways ==
In order to provide the faster link from Novi Sad to Western Serbia and the Montenegrin border, the motorway-expressway Novi Sad-Loznica is being built, fully replacing the state road from Novi Sad to Ruma. In Ruma the route switches from a expressway (M2) to a motorway (A8). From Ruma to Šabac it runs parallel and then splits off to parallel State Road 26. Further south the section from Požega to Boljare will be replaced by the A2 motorway paralleling the state road, allowing people from Novi Sad to reach the Montenegrin coast with a faster and safer link.

== Sections ==
Section number	Length	Distance	Section name
02101	4.820 km (2.995 mi)/1.063 km (0.661 mi)	4.820 km (2.995 mi)	Novi Sad (Sirig) – Petrovaradin (Račkog) (overlap with)
02102	5.806 km (3.608 mi)/0.228 km (0.142 mi)	10.626 km (6.603 mi)	Petrovaradin (Račkog) – Sremska Kamenica
02103	14.896 km (9.256 mi)/3.773 km (2.344 mi)	25.522 km (15.859 mi)	Sremska Kamenica – Irig (Krušedol) (over Fruška Gora)
02104	0.968 km (0.601 mi)	26.490 km (16.460 mi)	Irig (Krušedol) – Irig (Vrdnik)
02105	9.400 km (5.841 mi)	35.890 km (22.301 mi)	Irig (Vrdnik) – Ruma (Putinci)
02106	0.748 km (0.465 mi)	36.638 km (22.766 mi)	Ruma (Putinci) – Ruma (Pećinci)
02107	1.277 km (0.793 mi)	37.915 km (23.559 mi)	Ruma (Pećinci) – Ruma (Voganj) (overlap with)
02108	4.060 km (2.523 mi)	41.975 km (26.082 mi)	Ruma (Voganj) – Ruma
02109	6.909 km (4.293 mi)	48.884 km (30.375 mi)	Ruma – Jarak
02110	20.777 km (12.910 mi)	69.661 km (43.285 mi)	Jarak – Vojvodina border (Šabac)
02111	2.996 km (1.862 mi)/1.977 km (1.228 mi)	72.657 km (45.147 mi)	Vojvodina border (Šabac) – Šabac
02112	0.799 km (0.496 mi)/0.792 km (0.492 mi)	73.456 km (45.643 mi)	Šabac – Šabac (Lojanice) (overlap with)
02113	12.375 km (7.689 mi)	85.831 km (53.333 mi)	Šabac (Lojanice) – Lojanice
02114	3.115 km (1.936 mi)	88.946 km (55.268 mi)	Lojanice – Matijevac
02115	7.090 km (4.406 mi)	96.036 km (59.674 mi)	Matijevac – Draginje (Vladimirci)
02116	0.543 km (0.337 mi)	96.579 km (60.011 mi)	Draginje (Vladimirci) – Draginje (Kamenica)
02117	8.071 km (5.015 mi)	104.650 km (65.026 mi)	Draginje (Kamenica) – Koceljeva
02118	2.697 km (1.676 mi)	107.347 km (66.702 mi)	Koceljeva – Koceljeva (Novaci)
02119	4.552 km (2.828 mi)	111.899 km (69.531 mi)	Koceljeva (Novaci) – Družetić (Joševa)
02120	0.955 km (0.593 mi)	112.854 km (70.124 mi)	Družetić (Joševa) – Družetić (Pambukovica)
02121	1.956 km (1.215 mi)	114.810 km (71.340 mi)	Družetić (Pambukovica) – Gola Glava
02122	4.642 km (2.884 mi)	119.452 km (74.224 mi)	Gola Glava – Slatina
02123	15.703 km (9.757 mi)	135.155 km (83.981 mi)	Slatina – Valjevo (Brankovina)
02124	3.586 km (2.228 mi)/3.583 km (2.226 mi)	138.741 km (86.210 mi)	Valjevo (Brankovina) – Valjevo (bypass) (overlap with)
02125	1.563 km (0.971 mi)/0.524 km (0.326 mi)	140.304 km (87.181 mi)	Valjevo (bypass) – Valjevo (Brežđe)
02126	27.380 km (17.013 mi)	167.684 km (104.194 mi)	Valjevo (Brežđe) – Kaona
02127	15.441 km (9.595 mi)	183.125 km (113.789 mi)	Kaona – Kosjerić (Varda)
02128	1.518 km (0.943 mi)	184.643 km (114.732 mi)	Kosjerić (Varda) – Kosjerić
02129	13.889 km (8.630 mi)	198.532 km (123.362 mi)	Kosjerić – Čestobrodica
02130	10.609 km (6.592 mi)	209.141 km (129.954 mi)	Čestobrodica – Požega
02319	2.907 km (1.806 mi)	212.048 km (131.761 mi)	Požega – Požega (Arilje) (overlap with)
02138	12.624 km (7.844 mi)	224.672 km (139.605 mi)	Požega (Arilje) – – Gorobilje
02139	12.624 km (7.844 mi)	224.672 km (139.605 mi)	Gorobilje – Arilje
02132	19.176 km (11.915 mi)	243.848 km (151.520 mi)	Arilje – Prilike
02133	6.830 km (4.244 mi)	250.678 km (155.764 mi)	Prilike – Ivanjica (Guča)
02134	2.180 km (1.355 mi)/0.610 km (0.379 mi)	252.858 km (157.119 mi)	Ivanjica (Guča) – Ivanjica
02135	61.336 km (38.112 mi)	314.194 km (195.231 mi)	Ivanjica – Sjenica

== See also ==
- Roads in Serbia
- European route E761
- European route E763
