= Bogdanovica =

- Village (Selo)
- Location within Serbia
- Coordinates: 44°28′N 20°04′E
- Country: Serbia
- District: Kolubara District
- Municipality: Ub

Area
  - Total: 3.49 km^{2} (1.35 sq mi)
- Elevation: 92 m (302 ft)

Population (2011)
  - Total: 306
  - Density: 87.7/km^{2} (227/sq mi)
- Time zone: UTC+1 (CET)
  - Summer (DST): UTC+2 (CEST)

Bogdanovica is a village in the municipality of Ub, Serbia. According to the 2011 census, the village has a population of 306 people.
