= Kalinovac (Ub) =

Kalinovac Калиновац
- Village (Selo)
- Location within Serbia
- Coordinates: 44°30′N 19°57′E
- Country: Serbia
- District: Kolubara District
- Municipality: Ub

Area
  - Total: 8.36 km^{2} (3.23 sq mi)
- Elevation: 100 m (330 ft)

Population (2011)
  - Total: 406
  - Density: 48.6/km^{2} (126/sq mi)
- Time zone: UTC+1 (CET)
  - Summer (DST): UTC+2 (CEST)

Kalinovac is a village in the municipality of Ub, Serbia. According to the 2011 census, the village has a population of 406 people.
