= Lončanik =

- Village (Selo)
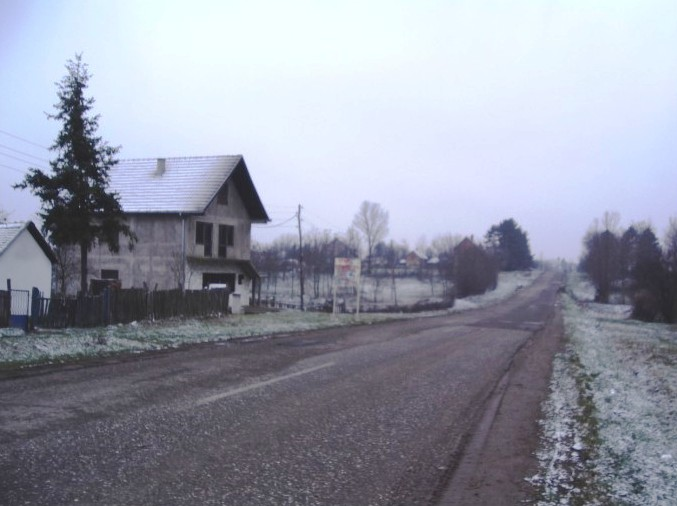
- A street in Lončanik

- Location within Serbia
- Coordinates: 44°32′N 20°06′E
- Country: Serbia
- District: Kolubara District
- Municipality: Ub

Area
  - Total: 7.94 km^{2} (3.07 sq mi)
- Elevation: 90 m (300 ft)

Population (2011)
  - Total: 477
  - Density: 60.1/km^{2} (156/sq mi)
- Time zone: UTC+1 (CET)
  - Summer (DST): UTC+2 (CEST)

Lončanik is a village in the municipality of Ub, Serbia. According to the 2011 census, the village has a population of 477 people.
