= Milorci =

- Village (Selo)
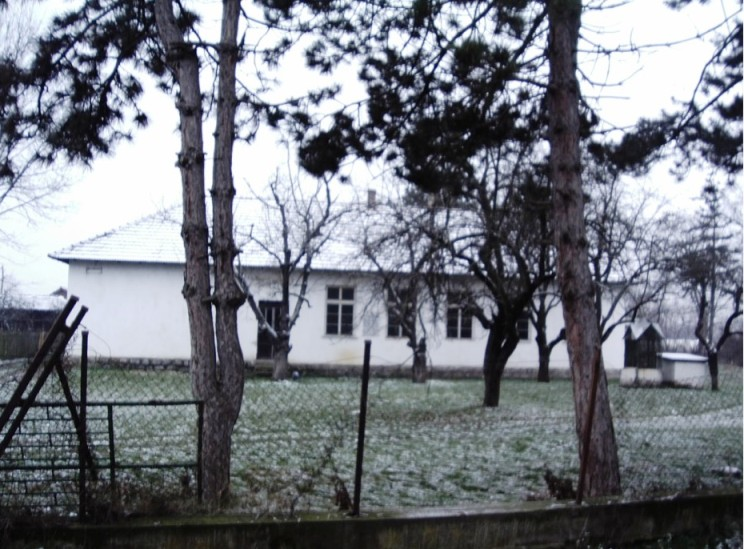

- Location within Serbia
- Coordinates: 44°31′N 20°06′E
- Country: Serbia
- District: Kolubara District
- Municipality: Ub

Area
  - Total: 4.35 km^{2} (1.68 sq mi)
- Elevation: 84 m (276 ft)

Population (2011)
  - Total: 349
  - Density: 80.2/km^{2} (208/sq mi)
- Time zone: UTC+1 (CET)
  - Summer (DST): UTC+2 (CEST)

Milorci is a village in the municipality of Ub, Serbia. According to the 2011 census, the village has a population of 349 people.
