= Vrhovine, Serbia =

Vrhovine Врховине
- Village (Selo)
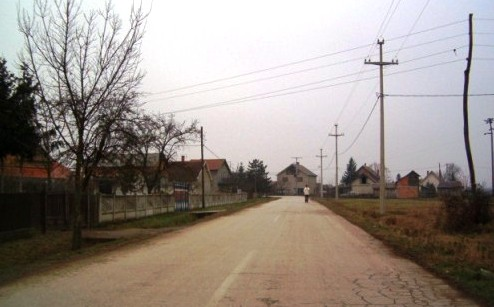
- A street in Vrhovine

- Location within Serbia
- Coordinates: 44°24′31″N 20°03′46″E
- Country: Serbia
- District: Kolubara District
- Municipality: Ub

Area
  - Total: 13.51 km^{2} (5.22 sq mi)

Population (2011)
  - Total: 455
  - Density: 33.7/km^{2} (87.2/sq mi)
- Time zone: UTC+1 (CET)
  - Summer (DST): UTC+2 (CEST)

Vrhovine is a village in the municipality of Ub, Serbia. According to the 2011 census, the village has a population of 455 people.
