= Banjani (Ub) =

Banjani Бањани
- Village (Selo)
- Location within Serbia
- Coordinates: 44°32′N 19°58′E
- Country: Serbia
- District: Kolubara District
- Municipality: Ub

Area
  - Total: 19.47 km^{2} (7.52 sq mi)
- Elevation: 114 m (374 ft)

Population (2011)
  - Total: 1,124
  - Density: 57.73/km^{2} (149.5/sq mi)
- Time zone: UTC+1 (CET)
  - Summer (DST): UTC+2 (CEST)

Banjani is a village in the municipality of Ub, Serbia. According to the 2011 census, the village has a population of 1,124 people.
