= Gvozdenović, Ub =

Gvozdenović Гвозденовић
- Village (Selo)
- Location within Serbia
- Coordinates: 44°23′02″N 20°02′04″E
- Country: Serbia
- Region: Šumadija and Western Serbia
- District: Kolubara District
- Municipality: Ub

Area
  - Total: 12.05 km^{2} (4.65 sq mi)
- Elevation: 234 m (768 ft)

Population (2011)
  - Total: 405
  - Density: 33.6/km^{2} (87.0/sq mi)
- Time zone: UTC+1 (CET)
  - Summer (DST): UTC+2 (CEST)

Gvozdenović is a village in the municipality of Ub, Serbia. According to the 2011 census, the village has a population of 405 inhabitants.

== Population ==
Population of Gvozdenović
| 1948 | 1953 | 1961 | 1971 | 1981 | 1991 | 2002 | 2011 |
| 868 | 839 | 744 | 643 | 567 | 509 | 468 | 405 |
