= Murgaš (Ub) =

Coordinates: 44°25′N 20°5′E

- Village (Selo)
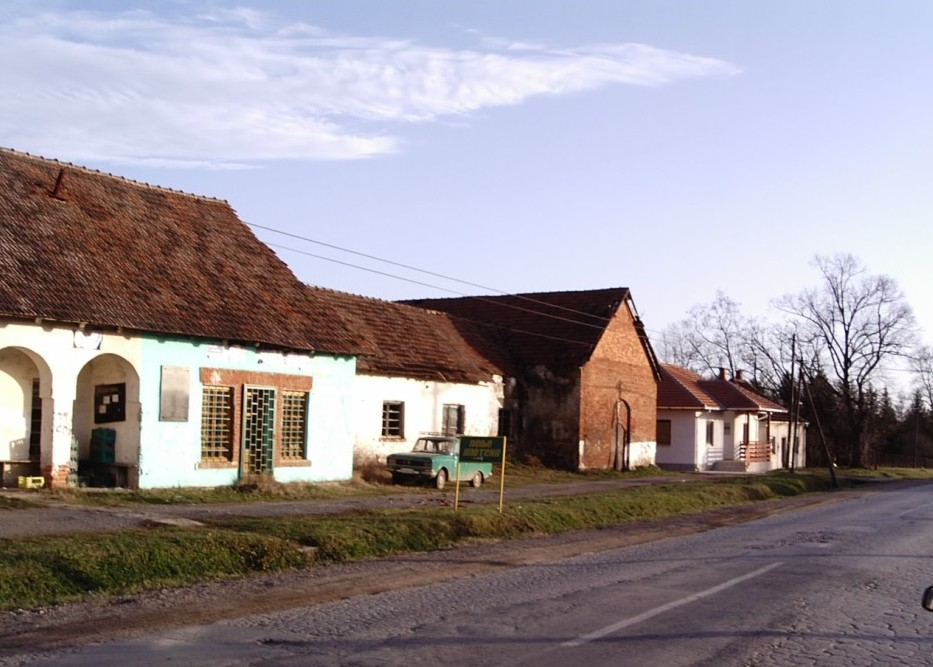
- Murgaš Centre
- Interactive map of Murgaš
- Country: Serbia
- District: Kolubara District
- Municipality: Ub

Area
  - Total: 9.09 km^{2} (3.51 sq mi)
- Elevation: 140 m (460 ft)

Population (2011)
  - Total: 562
  - Density: 61.8/km^{2} (160/sq mi)
- Time zone: UTC+1 (CET)
  - Summer (DST): UTC+2 (CEST)

Murgaš is a village in the municipality of Ub, Serbia. According to the 2011 census, the village has a population of 562 people.
