= Kalenić (Ub) =

Coordinates: 44.5086100°N 20.1963900°E

Kalenić Каленић
- Village (Selo)
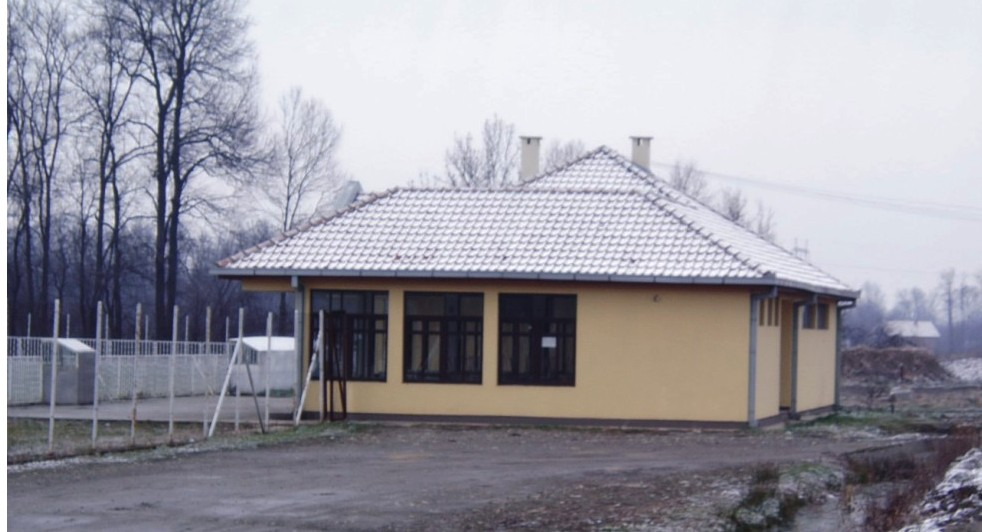
- School in Kalenić
- Interactive map of Kalenić
- Country: Serbia
- District: Kolubara District
- Municipality: Ub

Area
  - Total: 13.81 km^{2} (5.33 sq mi)
- Elevation: 87 m (285 ft)

Population (2011)
  - Total: 759
  - Density: 55.0/km^{2} (142/sq mi)
- Time zone: UTC+1 (CET)
  - Summer (DST): UTC+2 (CEST)

Kalenić (Serbian Cyrillic: Каленић) is a village in the municipality of Ub in western Serbia. According to the 2011 census, Kalenić had 759 residents.

== History ==
The former village was resettled in 2003 to make room for the expansion of the coal field "Tamnava" of the nearby Kolubara coal mine, centered at Veliki Crljeni). The new village was built a few kilometers away, but most residents chose to resettle elsewhere.

A modern regional landfill was planned to be opened on abandoned coalfields near Kalenić in 2013.
