= Radljevo =

- Village (Selo)
- Location within Serbia
- Coordinates: 44°29′48″N 20°10′14″E
- Country: Serbia
- Municipality: Ub

Area
  - Total: 11.83 km^{2} (4.57 sq mi)
- Elevation: 108 m (354 ft)

Population (2011)
  - Total: 611
  - Density: 51.6/km^{2} (134/sq mi)
- Time zone: UTC+1 (CET)
  - Summer (DST): UTC+2 (CEST)

Radljevo (Serbian Cyrillic: Радљево) is a village in Serbia. It is situated in the Ub municipality, in the Kolubara District of Central Serbia. The village has a population of 611 inhabitants, as of the 2011 census.

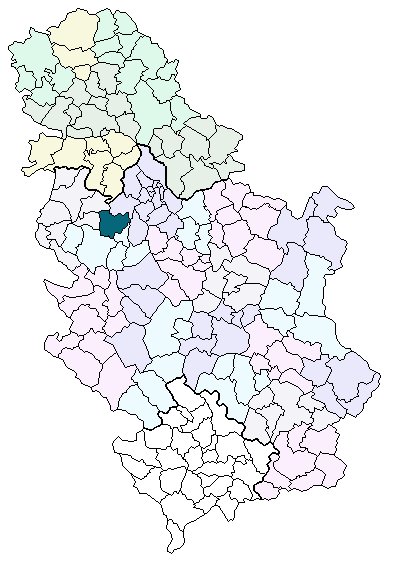
Location of the Ub municipality in Serbia

== Historical population ==
- 1948: 1165
- 1953: 1172
- 1961: 1136
- 1971: 948
- 1981: 774
- 1991: 677
- 2002: 607

== See also ==
- List of places in Serbia
