= Zvizdar =

- Village (Selo)
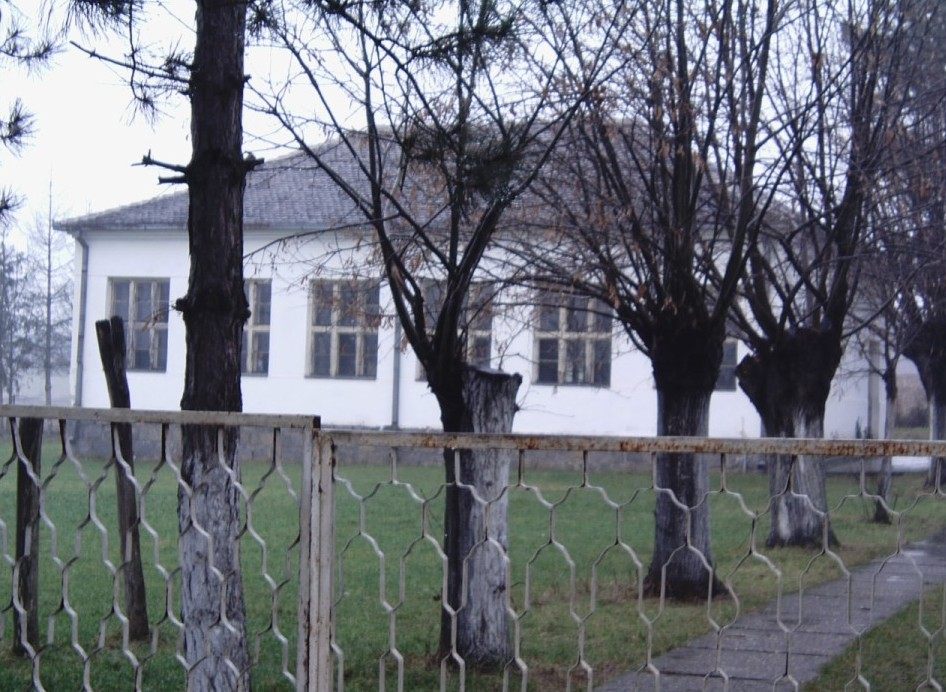
- Elementary school in Zvizdar

- Location within Serbia
- Coordinates: 44°26′N 20°04′E
- Country: Serbia
- District: Kolubara District
- Municipality: Ub

Area
  - Total: 10.27 km^{2} (3.97 sq mi)
- Elevation: 167 m (548 ft)

Population (2011)
  - Total: 494
  - Density: 48.1/km^{2} (125/sq mi)
- Time zone: UTC+1 (CET)
  - Summer (DST): UTC+2 (CEST)

Zvizdar is a village in the municipality of Ub, Serbia. According to the 2011 census, the village has a population of 494 people.
