= Dokmir =

- Village (Selo)
- Location within Serbia
- Coordinates: 44°23′12″N 19°58′47″E
- Country: Serbia
- District: Kolubara District
- Municipality: Ub

Area
  - Total: 16.38 km^{2} (6.32 sq mi)
- Elevation: 251 m (823 ft)

Population (2011)
  - Total: 431
  - Density: 26.3/km^{2} (68.1/sq mi)
- Time zone: UTC+1 (CET)
  - Summer (DST): UTC+2 (CEST)

Dokmir is a village in the municipality of Ub, Serbia. According to the 2011 census, the village has a population of 431 people.
