= Vukona =

- Village (Selo)
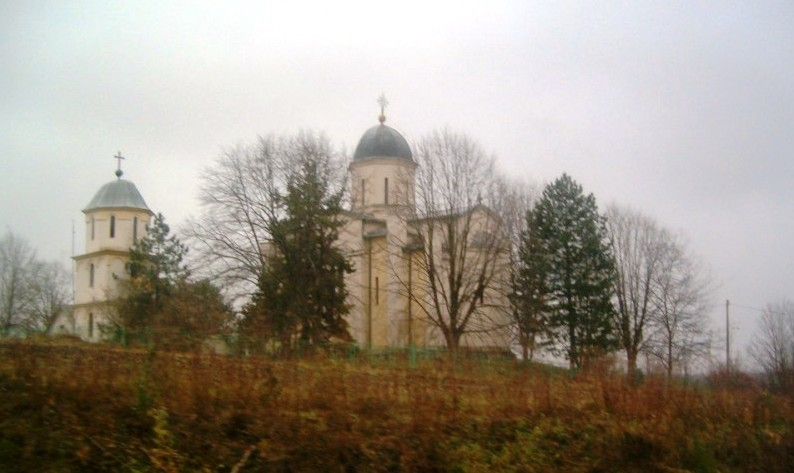
- A church in Vukona

- Location within Serbia
- Coordinates: 44°34′12″N 19°56′47″E
- Country: Serbia
- District: Kolubara District
- Municipality: Ub

Area
  - Total: 6.79 km^{2} (2.62 sq mi)
- Elevation: 114 m (374 ft)

Population (2011)
  - Total: 215
  - Density: 31.7/km^{2} (82.0/sq mi)
- Time zone: UTC+1 (CET)
  - Summer (DST): UTC+2 (CEST)

Vukona is a village in the municipality of Ub, Serbia. According to the 2011 census, the village has a population of 215 people.
