= Liso Polje =

- Village (Selo)
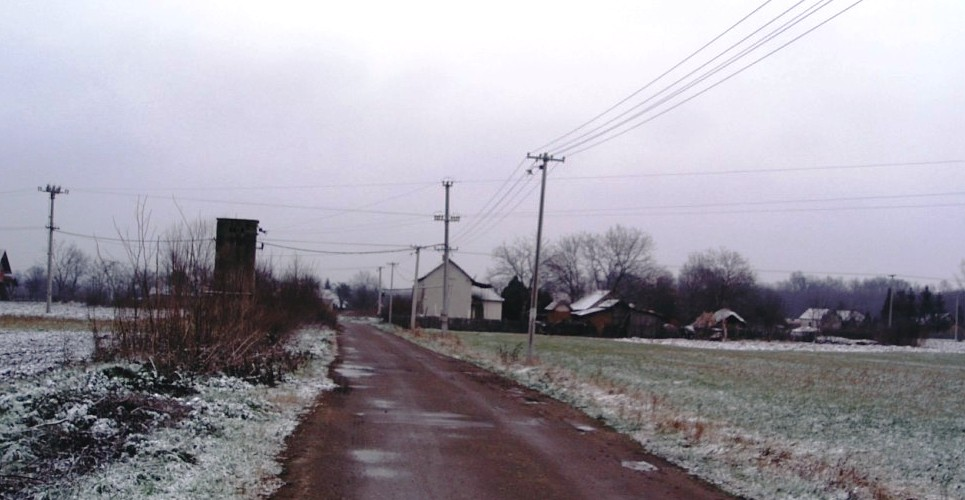

- Location within Serbia
- Coordinates: 44°32′N 20°11′E
- Country: Serbia
- District: Kolubara District
- Municipality: Ub

Area
  - Total: 4.55 km^{2} (1.76 sq mi)
- Elevation: 78 m (256 ft)

Population (2011)
  - Total: 225
  - Density: 49.5/km^{2} (128/sq mi)
- Time zone: UTC+1 (CET)
  - Summer (DST): UTC+2 (CEST)

Liso Polje is a village in the municipality of Ub, Serbia. According to the 2011 census, the village has a population of 225 people.
