= Gunjevac =

- Village (Selo)
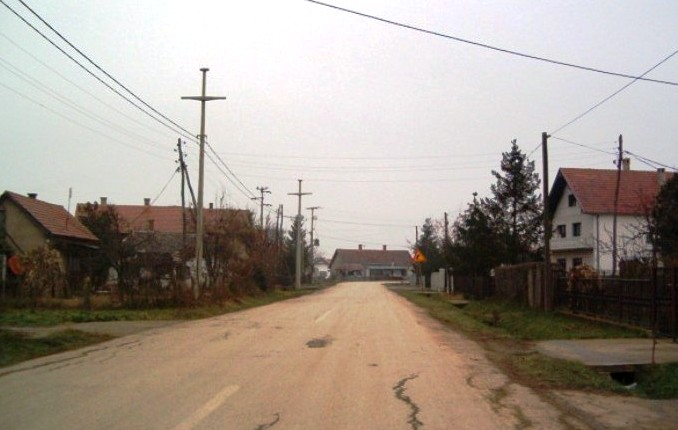
- Gunjevac

- Location within Serbia
- Coordinates: 44°26′N 20°02′E
- Country: Serbia
- District: Kolubara District
- Municipality: Ub

Area
  - Total: 5.27 km^{2} (2.03 sq mi)
- Elevation: 177 m (581 ft)

Population (2011)
  - Total: 514
  - Density: 97.5/km^{2} (253/sq mi)
- Time zone: UTC+1 (CET)
  - Summer (DST): UTC+2 (CEST)

Gunjevac is a village in the municipality of Ub, Serbia. According to the 2011 census, the village has a population of 514 people.
