= Kožuar =

- Village (Selo)
- Location within Serbia
- Coordinates: 44°32′N 19°55′E
- Country: Serbia
- District: Kolubara District
- Municipality: Ub

Area
  - Total: 16.17 km^{2} (6.24 sq mi)
- Elevation: 155 m (509 ft)

Population (2011)
  - Total: 654
  - Density: 40.4/km^{2} (105/sq mi)
- Time zone: UTC+1 (CET)
  - Summer (DST): UTC+2 (CEST)

Kožuar is a village in the municipality of Ub, Serbia. According to the 2011 census, the village has a population of 654 people.
