= Takovo (Ub) =

Takovo Таково
- Village (Selo)
- Location within Serbia
- Coordinates: 44°30′N 20°03′E
- Country: Serbia
- District: Kolubara District
- Municipality: Ub

Area
  - Total: 15.25 km^{2} (5.89 sq mi)
- Elevation: 92 m (302 ft)

Population (2011)
  - Total: 883
  - Density: 57.9/km^{2} (150/sq mi)
- Time zone: UTC+1 (CET)
  - Summer (DST): UTC+2 (CEST)

Takovo is a village in the municipality of Ub, Serbia. According to the 2011 census, the village has a population of 883 people.
