= Tulari =

- Village (Selo)
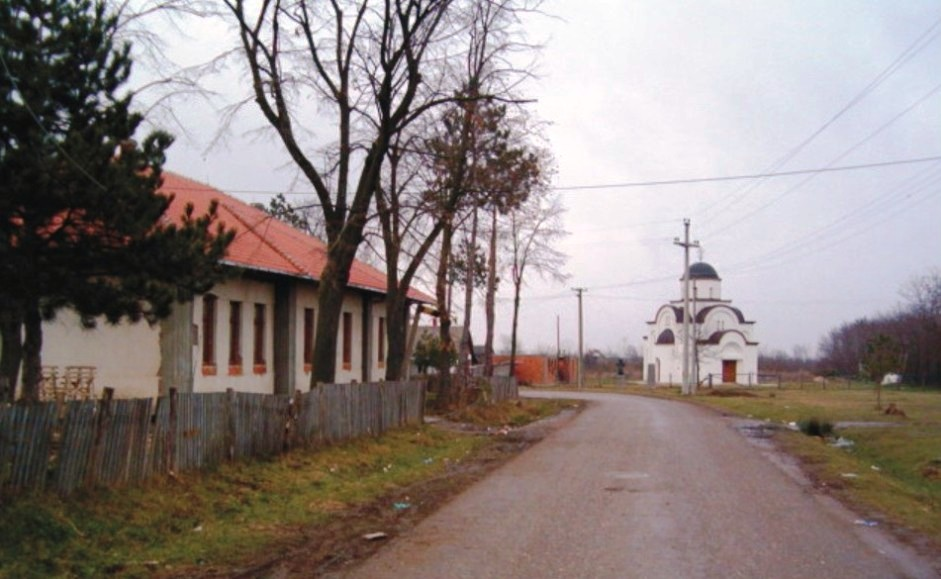
- Town center

- Location within Serbia
- Coordinates: 44°31′N 19°55′E
- Country: Serbia
- District: Kolubara District
- Municipality: Ub

Area
  - Total: 20.16 km^{2} (7.78 sq mi)
- Elevation: 134 m (440 ft)

Population (2011)
  - Total: 774
  - Density: 38.4/km^{2} (99.4/sq mi)
- Time zone: UTC+1 (CET)
  - Summer (DST): UTC+2 (CEST)

Tulari is a village in the municipality of Ub, Serbia. According to the 2011 census, the village has a population of 774 people.
