= Šarbane =

- Village (Selo)
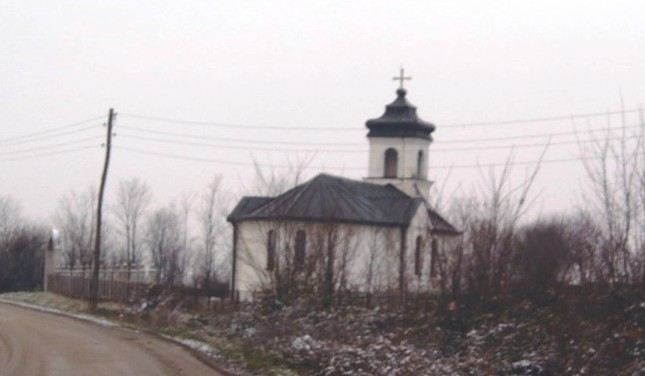
- Church in Šarbane

- Location within Serbia
- Coordinates: 44°29′N 20°08′E
- Country: Serbia
- District: Kolubara District
- Municipality: Ub

Area
  - Total: 11.91 km^{2} (4.60 sq mi)

Population (2011)
  - Total: 501
  - Density: 42.1/km^{2} (109/sq mi)
- Time zone: UTC+1 (CET)
  - Summer (DST): UTC+2 (CEST)

Šarbane is a village in the municipality of Ub, Serbia. According to the 2011 census, the village has a population of 501 people.
