= Trnjaci, Ub =

Trnjaci Трњаци
- Village (Selo)
- Location within Serbia
- Coordinates: 44.45440°N 20.089687°E
- Country: Serbia
- District: Kolubara District
- Municipality: Ub
- Elevation: 138 m (453 ft)

Population (2011)
  - Total: 747
- Time zone: UTC+1 (CET)
  - Summer (DST): UTC+2 (CEST)

Trnjaci (Serbian Cyrillic: Трњаци) is a village in the municipality of Ub in western Serbia. According to the 2011 census, the village has a population of 747 inhabitants.
