= Tvrdojevac =

- Village (Selo)
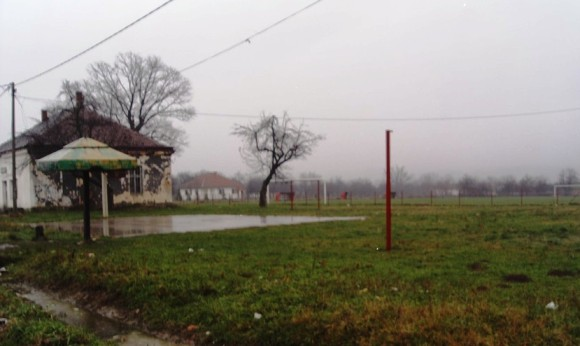

- Location within Serbia
- Coordinates: 44°25′N 19°59′E
- Country: Serbia
- District: Kolubara District
- Municipality: Ub

Area
  - Total: 8.56 km^{2} (3.31 sq mi)
- Elevation: 107 m (351 ft)

Population (2011)
  - Total: 323
  - Density: 37.7/km^{2} (97.7/sq mi)
- Time zone: UTC+1 (CET)
  - Summer (DST): UTC+2 (CEST)

Tvrdojevac is a village in the municipality of Ub, Serbia. According to the 2011 census, the village has a population of 323 people.
