= Stublenica =

- Village (Selo)
- Interactive map of Stublenica
- Coordinates: 44°26′35″N 20°07′11″E
- Country: Serbia
- District: Kolubara
- Municipality: Ub

Area
  - Total: 19.69 km^{2} (7.60 sq mi)
- Elevation: 152 m (499 ft)

Population (2011)
  - Total: 888
  - Density: 45.1/km^{2} (117/sq mi)

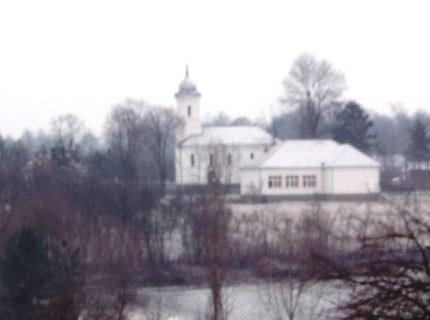
Stublenica center

Stublenica is a village in the Central Serbian municipality of Ub. According to the 2011 census, the village has 888 inhabitants.
