= Kršna Glava =

- Village (Selo)
- Location within Serbia
- Coordinates: 44°22′N 19°57′E
- Country: Serbia
- District: Kolubara District
- Municipality: Ub

Area
  - Total: 7.33 km^{2} (2.83 sq mi)

Population (2011)
  - Total: 156
  - Density: 21.3/km^{2} (55.1/sq mi)
- Time zone: UTC+1 (CET)
  - Summer (DST): UTC+2 (CEST)

Kršna Glava is a village in the municipality of Ub, Serbia. According to the 2011 census, the village has a population of 156 people.
