= Crvena Jabuka (Ub) =

Crvena Jabuka Црвена Јабука
- Village (Selo)
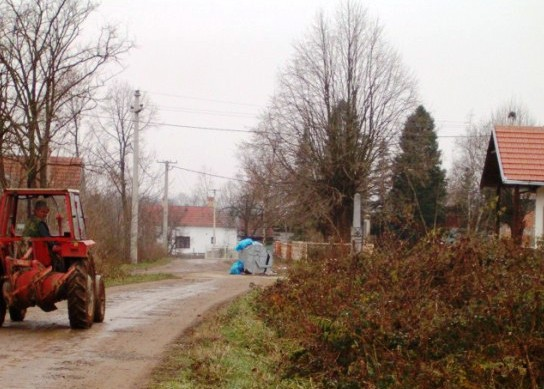
- Crvena Jabuka in 2012

- Location within Serbia
- Coordinates: 44°30′N 20°05′E
- Country: Serbia
- District: Kolubara District
- Municipality: Ub

Area
  - Total: 6.48 km^{2} (2.50 sq mi)
- Elevation: 86 m (282 ft)

Population (2011)
  - Total: 558
  - Density: 86.1/km^{2} (223/sq mi)
- Time zone: UTC+1 (CET)
  - Summer (DST): UTC+2 (CEST)

Crvena Jabuka is a village in the municipality of Ub, Serbia. According to the 2011 census, the village has a population of 558 people.
