= Čučuge =

- Village (Selo)
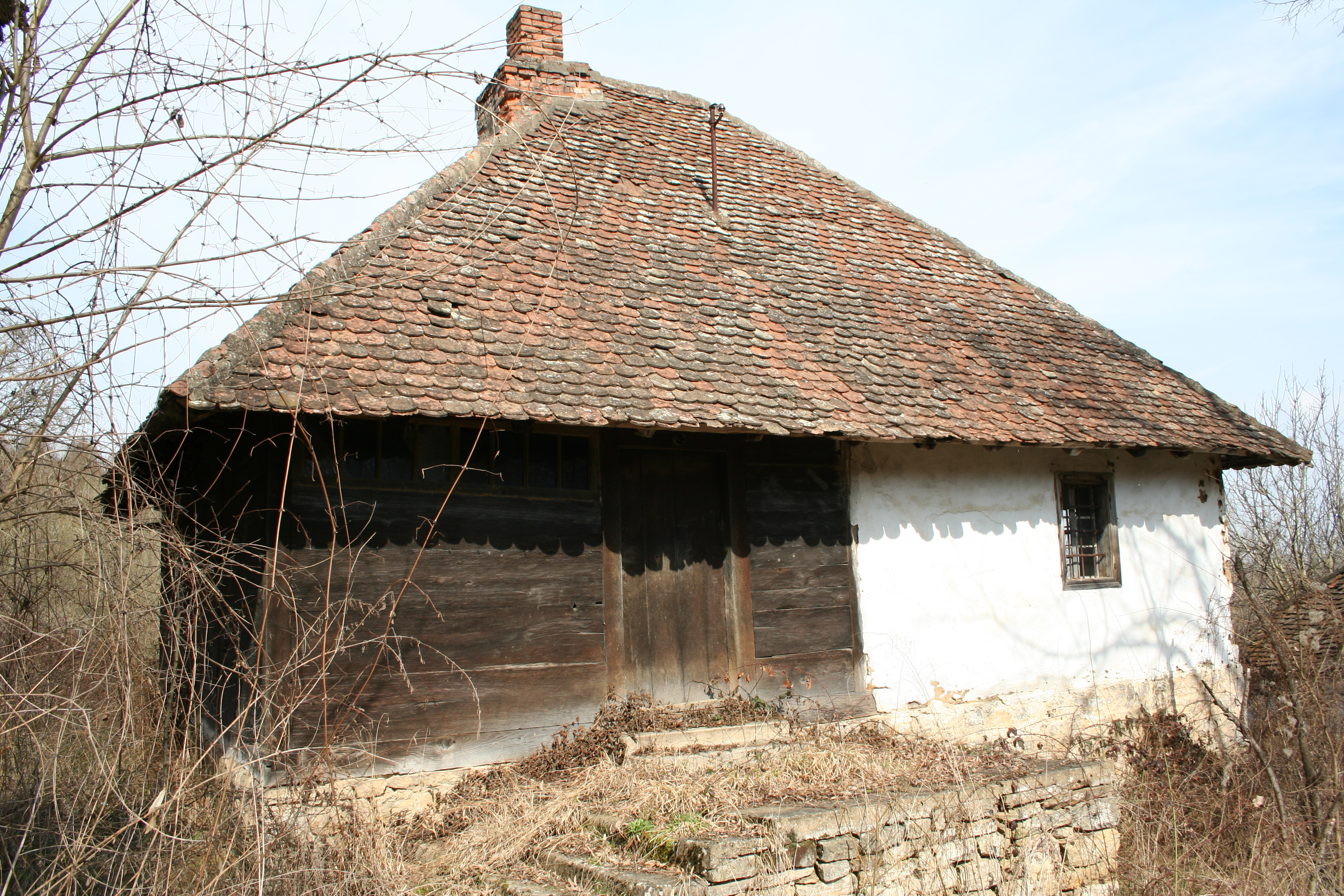
- Kuća Radojičića

- Location within Serbia
- Coordinates: 44°24′N 19°58′E
- Country: Serbia
- District: Kolubara District
- Municipality: Ub

Area
  - Total: 11.38 km^{2} (4.39 sq mi)
- Elevation: 131 m (430 ft)

Population (2011)
  - Total: 434
  - Density: 38.1/km^{2} (98.8/sq mi)
- Time zone: UTC+1 (CET)
  - Summer (DST): UTC+2 (CEST)

Čučuge is a village in the municipality of Ub, Serbia. According to the 2011 census, the village has a population of 434 people.
