= Trlić =

- Village (Selo)
- Location within Serbia
- Coordinates: 44°28′N 19°57′E
- Country: Serbia
- District: Kolubara District
- Municipality: Ub

Area
  - Total: 18.39 km^{2} (7.10 sq mi)
- Elevation: 136 m (446 ft)

Population (2011)
  - Total: 877
  - Density: 47.7/km^{2} (124/sq mi)
- Time zone: UTC+1 (CET)
  - Summer (DST): UTC+2 (CEST)

Trlić is a village in the municipality of Ub, Serbia. According to the 2011 census, the village has a population of 877 people.
