= Slatina (Ub) =

Slatina Слатина
- Village (Selo)
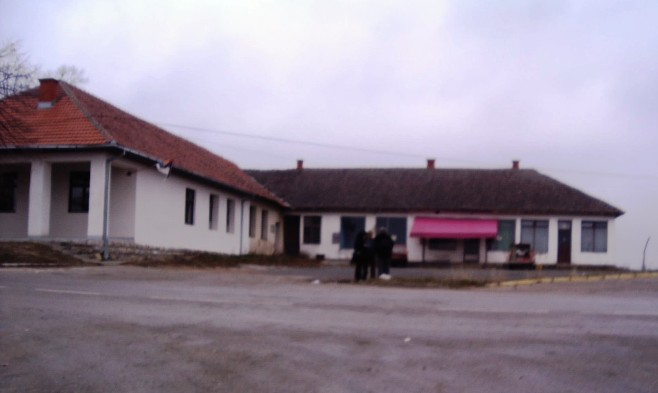
- Town center

- Location within Serbia
- Coordinates: 44°24′N 19°54′E
- Country: Serbia
- District: Kolubara District
- Municipality: Ub

Area
  - Total: 9.96 km^{2} (3.85 sq mi)
- Elevation: 185 m (607 ft)

Population (2011)
  - Total: 345
  - Density: 34.6/km^{2} (89.7/sq mi)
- Time zone: UTC+1 (CET)
  - Summer (DST): UTC+2 (CEST)

Slatina is a village in the municipality of Ub, Serbia. According to the 2011 census, the village has a population of 345 people.
