= Ub, Serbia =

Ub Уб (Serbian)
- Town and municipality
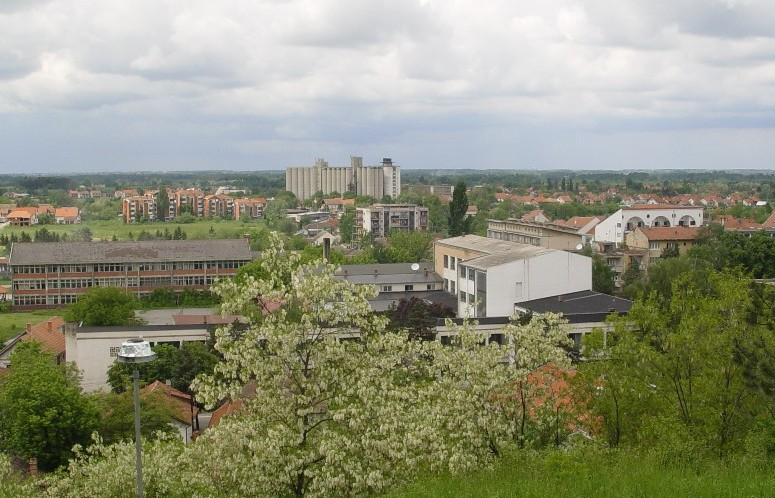
- Panoramic view on Ub

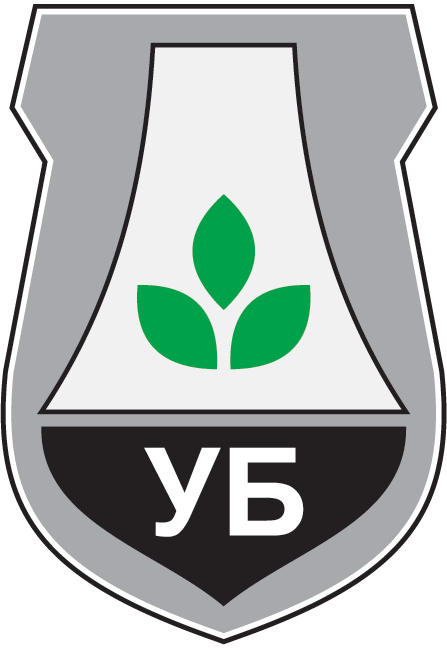
- Coat of arms

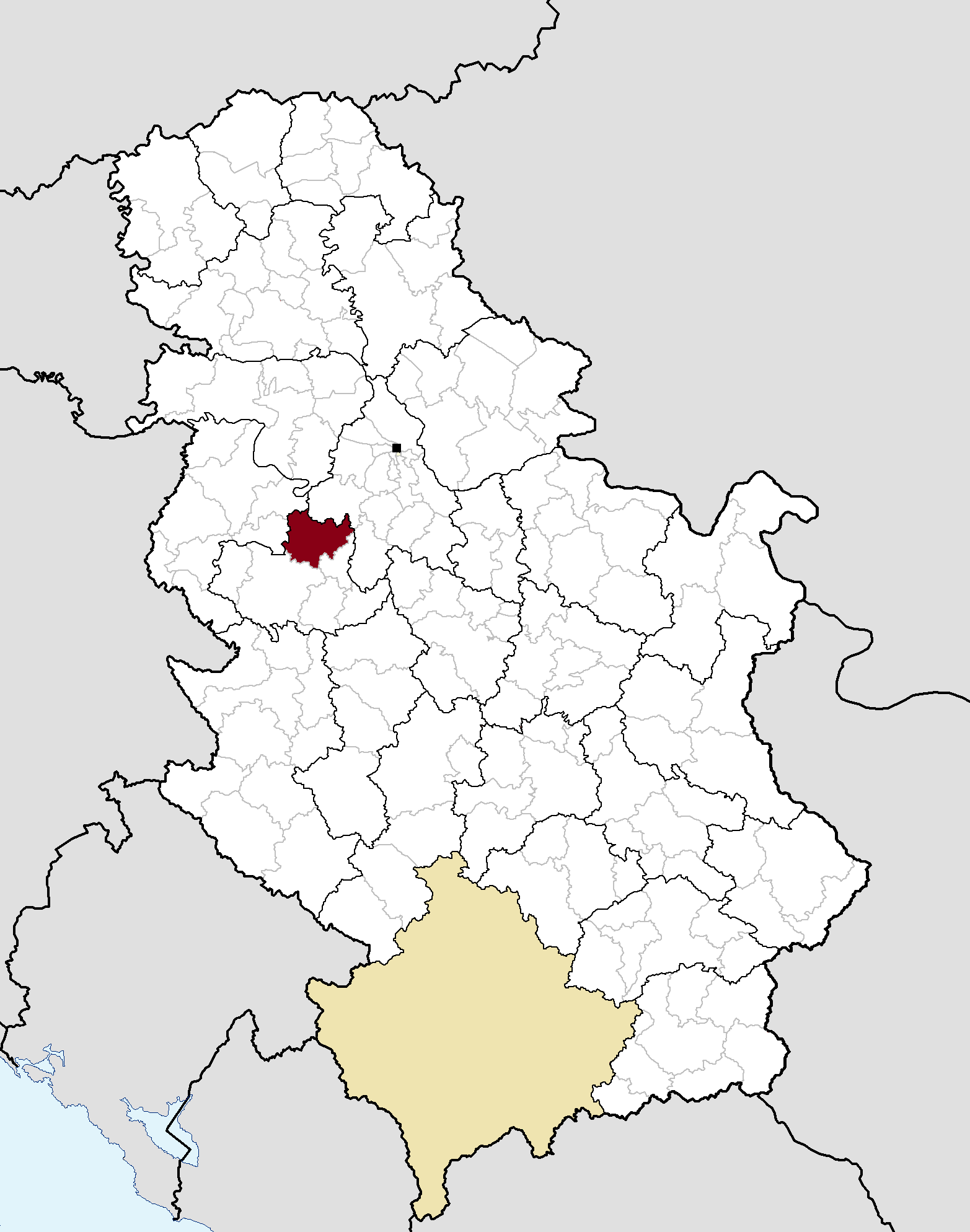
- Location of the municipality of Ub within Serbia
- Coordinates: 44°27′22″N 20°4′26″E
- Country: Serbia
- Region: Šumadija and Western Serbia
- District: Kolubara
- Settlements: 38

Government
  - Mayor: Aleksandar Jovanović (SNS)

Area
  - Town: 4.35 km^{2} (1.68 sq mi)
  - Municipality: 456 km^{2} (176 sq mi)
- Elevation: 97 m (318 ft)

Population (2022 census)
  - Town: 6,684
  - Town density: 1,540/km^{2} (3,980/sq mi)
  - Municipality: 25,780
  - Municipality density: 56.5/km^{2} (146/sq mi)
- Time zone: UTC+1 (CET)
  - Summer (DST): UTC+2 (CEST)
- Postal code: 14210
- Area code: +381(0)14
- Car plates: UB
- Website: www.opstinaub.org.rs

Ub (Serbian Cyrillic: Уб) is a town and municipality located in the Kolubara District of western Serbia. As of 2022, the population of the town is 6,684, while population of the municipality is 25,780 inhabitants.

== History ==
The first communities established at the municipal territory of Ub, according to the historical traces and traces of human civilization discovered in the current settlements of Trlić, Kalinovac, Brgule, originated from the time of Vinča culture, around 5000 BC. In the settlement of Čučuge today there are traces of the Bronze Age.

The most probable theory of the origin of the name is from the Latin word urbs 'city'. According to legend, the place was built in the reign of Prince Kocelj, and named after his brother Slavoljub. Over time, the names shortened to just "Ub".

The most important cultural and historical monument of Ub is the church - monastery in the village Dokmir, dating from the fifteenth century. Research suggests that the monastery was restored in 1415, so it is believed to date from an earlier period. Also affiliated with the monastery are the nuns of the Žitomislić Monastery in Herzegovina, who had fled the war in Bosnia in the early 1990s.

The Tamnava area has preserved evidence of earlier styles and ways of life. In the mountain areas were fortresses, monasteries, churches and towers, and it is often difficult to reach such areas, but in the plains, monuments and buildings were often removed, leaving little trace, barely sufficient to preserve some features of the old life.

== Settlements ==
Apart from the town of Ub, the municipality consists of the following villages (2002 population given in parentheses):

- Banjani (1395)
- Bogdanovica (348)
- Brezovica (668)
- Brgule (1235)
- Crvena Jabuka (631)
- Čučuge (463)
- Dokmir (558)
- Gunjevac (497)
- Gvozdenović (468)
- Joševa (455)
- Kalenić (888)
- Kalinovac (480)
- Kožuar (708)
- Kršna Glava (221)
- Liso Polje (278)
- Lončanik (551)
- Milorci (407)
- Murgaš (Ub) (559)
- Novaci (879)
- Paljuvi (769)
- Pambukovica (1173)
- Radljevo (607)
- Raduša (297)
- Ruklada (372)
- Šarbane (545)
- Slatina (413)
- Sovljak (1933)
- Stublenica (999)
- Takovo (979)
- Trlić (1020)
- Trnjaci (909)
- Tulari (945)
- Tvrdojevac (402)
- Vrelo (1684)
- Vrhovine (552)
- Vukona (262)
- Zvizdar (536)

== Demographics ==
Historical population
Year	Pop.	±% p.a.
1948	37,894	—
1953	39,186	+0.67%
1961	38,648	−0.17%
1971	37,512	−0.30%
1981	36,259	−0.34%
1991	34,593	−0.47%
2002	32,104	−0.68%
2011	29,101	−1.09%
2022	25,780	−1.10%

According to the 2011 census results, the municipality of Ub has 29,101 inhabitants. Of these, the urban settlement of Ub has a population of 6,164 inhabitants, while the other settlements have a range of population. The larger villages are Banjani, Vrelo, Takovo, Pambukovica and Sovljak.

=== Ethnic groups ===
In addition to Serbs who make up almost 95% of the population, there were also significant Romani community with 3.8% of total population. The ethnic composition of the municipality:

Ethnic group	Population	%
Serbs	27,525	94.58%
Roma	1,118	3.84%
Romanians	64	0.22%
Montenegrins	25	0.09%
Macedonians	18	0.06%
Croats	18	0.06%
Yugoslavs	17	0.06%
Others	316	1.09%
Total	29,101	

== Education ==
There are four elementary schools in the municipality, with around 2,270 students (as of 2010). Secondary education facilities in the municipality of Ub are Gymnasium "Branislav Petronijević" with 190 students and Technical School "Ub" with 448 students (as of 2010). Students profile and interests that are acquired at the end of school (grammar school is general education profile, while a secondary technical school represented sections: machine in computer design, auto mechanics, body mechanic, waiter, cook, textile worker, trade technician, dealer, locksmith, locksmith and lathe), generally meet the needs of municipalities and the environment, which confirms the high occupancy rate, which generally meet existing needs. Equipment of schools is satisfactory.

== Economy and infrastructure ==
The municipality of Ub is linked through a network of regional roads, allowing a good road connection with the municipal and regional centers that surround it.

The municipality is connected through roads M-4, M-21 M-22 and M-19 with all other towns in Serbia. According to data from 2004, the total length of roads was 244 km (152 mi), of which 197 km (122 mi) of roads were surfaced with modern pavement. The road network is in good condition, and in the years to come it is planned expansion and improvement. A projected Belgrade–Bar motorway goes through the territory of Ub. A junction is planned to be built 4 km (2 mi) from the town, in the village of Stublenica, 38 km (24 mi) from Belgrade. Near this area is the projected future industrial zone Ub East.

The industrial railway is passing through the territory and serves only to economic activity and to the open pit mines Kolubara. The city of Ub is located at 6 km (4 mi) from the nearest railway station in Lajkovac, on the Belgrade–Bar railway.

Belgrade Airport "Nikola Tesla" is 50 km (31 mi) away. Especially important transportation development opportunities and activities that monitor traffic can be achieved by building the Belgrade - Southern Adria highway route, which passes near the City of Ub.

The area of Ub is partially covered by a network of telecommunication facilities. According to the Republican Bureau of Statistics, in 2007 there were 8,920 land phone subscribers.

Economic preview

The following table gives a preview of total number of registered people employed in legal entities per their core activity (as of 2018):

Activity	Total
Agriculture, forestry and fishing	577
Mining and quarrying	112
Manufacturing	615
Electricity, gas, steam and air conditioning supply	38
Water supply; sewerage, waste management and remediation activities	164
Construction	345
Wholesale and retail trade, repair of motor vehicles and motorcycles	909
Transportation and storage	387
Accommodation and food services	166
Information and communication	51
Financial and insurance activities	32
Real estate activities	3
Professional, scientific and technical activities	152
Administrative and support service activities	25
Public administration and defense; compulsory social security	254
Education	399
Human health and social work activities	248
Arts, entertainment and recreation	47
Other service activities	87
Individual agricultural workers	1,726
Total	6,339

== Mineral resources ==
There are several mines and resource centers of coal (Radljevo field - 344,000,000 tones, Zvizdar field - 280,000,000 tones), clay, sand, stone and limestone.

The biggest producer of quartz sand in Serbia is "Kopovi a.d.", with overall production of over 400,000 tones per year.

Clay pits are based below the layers of sand and quartz sand. Municipality of Ub is the biggest supplier of high-quality clay in Serbia. There are more than 1,800,000 tones of clay.

== Sports ==
Local football club Jedinstvo has played the 2024–25 season in the Serbian top tier, the SuperLiga.

== Notable people ==
- Branislav Petronijević, philosopher, one of the 100 most prominent Serbs
- Svetomir Nikolajević, prime minister of Serbia
- Aleksandar Popović, writer
- Vojislav Tankosić, military officer
- Dragan Džajić, footballer
- Dušan Savić, footballer
- Sreten Ninković, track and field (marathon runner)
- Radosav Petrović, footballer
- Darko Glišić, politician
- Nemanja Matić, footballer

== International cooperation ==
Ub is twinned with the following cities and municipalities:

- Istočno Novo Sarajevo, Bosnia and Herzegovina

== See also ==
- Subdivisions of Serbia
