= Pambukovica =

- Village (Selo)
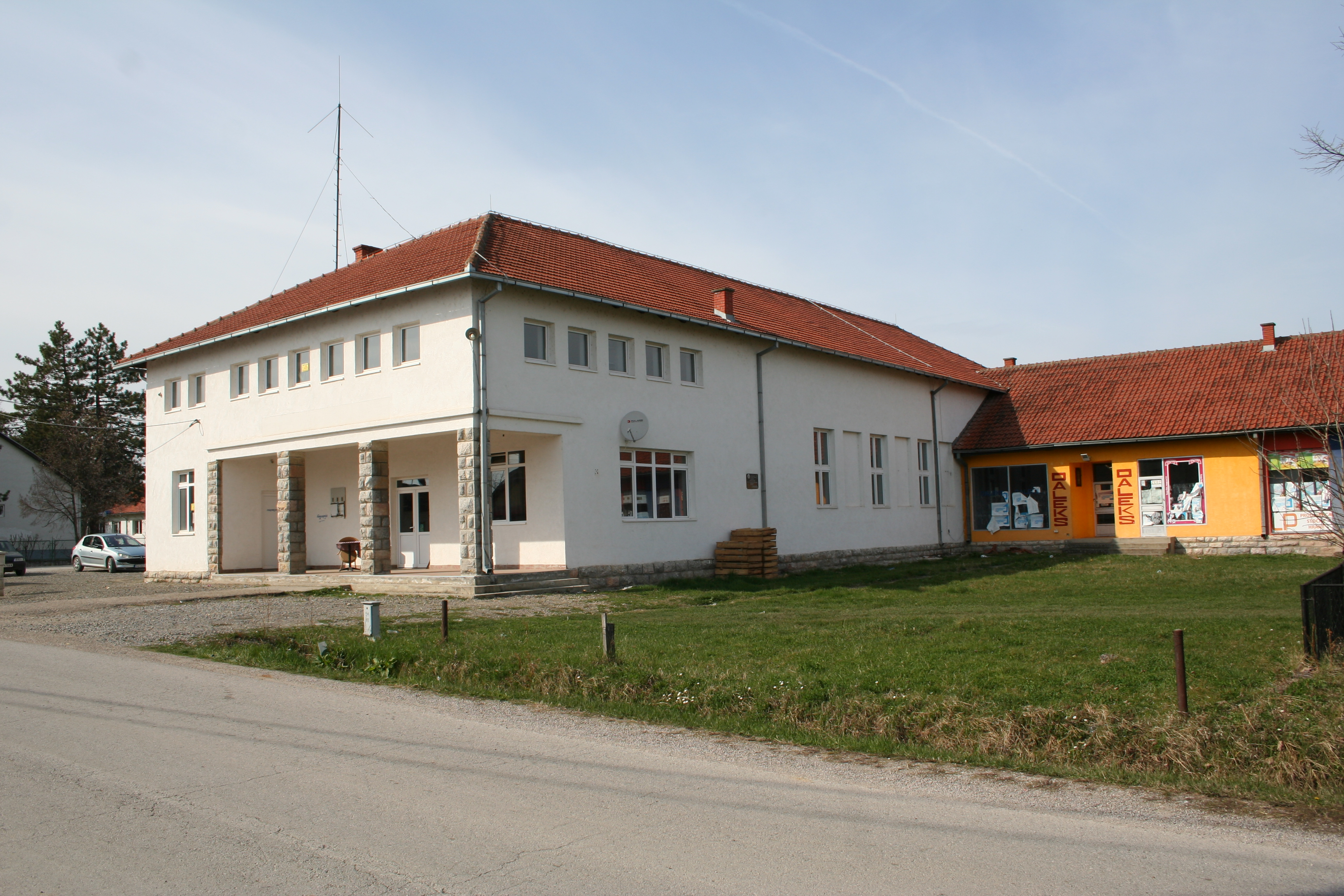

- Location within Serbia
- Coordinates: 44°26′N 19°55′E
- Country: Serbia
- District: Kolubara District
- Municipality: Ub

Area
  - Total: 27.69 km^{2} (10.69 sq mi)
- Elevation: 157 m (515 ft)

Population (2011)
  - Total: 988
  - Density: 35.7/km^{2} (92.4/sq mi)
- Time zone: UTC+1 (CET)
  - Summer (DST): UTC+2 (CEST)

Pambukovica is a village in the municipality of Ub, Serbia. According to the 2011 census, the village has a population of 988 people.
