= Joševa (Ub) =

Joševa Јошева
- Village (Selo)
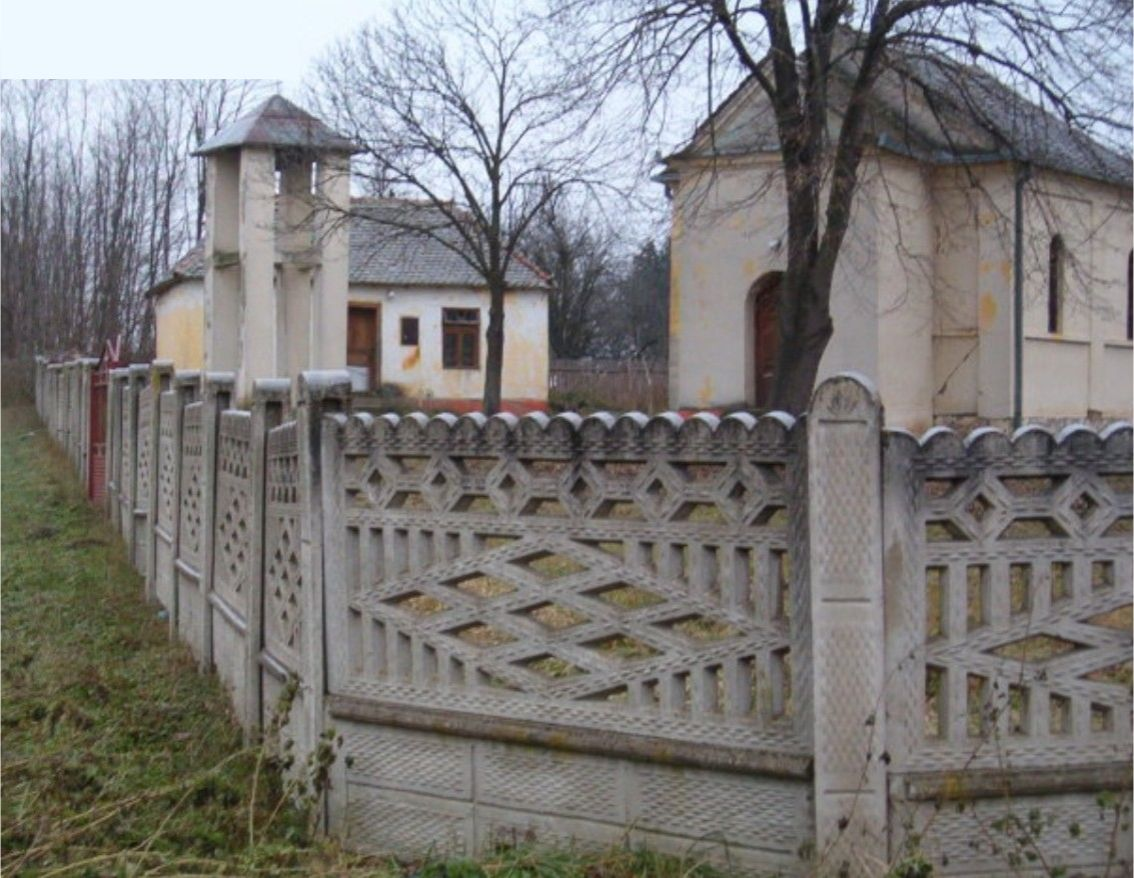
- Joseva Village, Kolubara Church⛪, Serbia 🇷🇸

- Location within Serbia
- Coordinates: 44°31′N 20°05′E
- Country: Serbia
- District: Kolubara District
- Municipality: Ub

Area
  - Total: 7.68 km^{2} (2.97 sq mi)
- Elevation: 107 m (351 ft)

Population (2011)
  - Total: 416
  - Density: 54.2/km^{2} (140/sq mi)
- Time zone: UTC+1 (CET)
  - Summer (DST): UTC+2 (CEST)

Joševa is a village in the municipality of Ub, Serbia. According to the 2011 census, the village has a population of 416 people.
