= Kolubara District =

Administrative district of Serbia

Kolubara District Колубарски округ
- Administrative district of Serbia
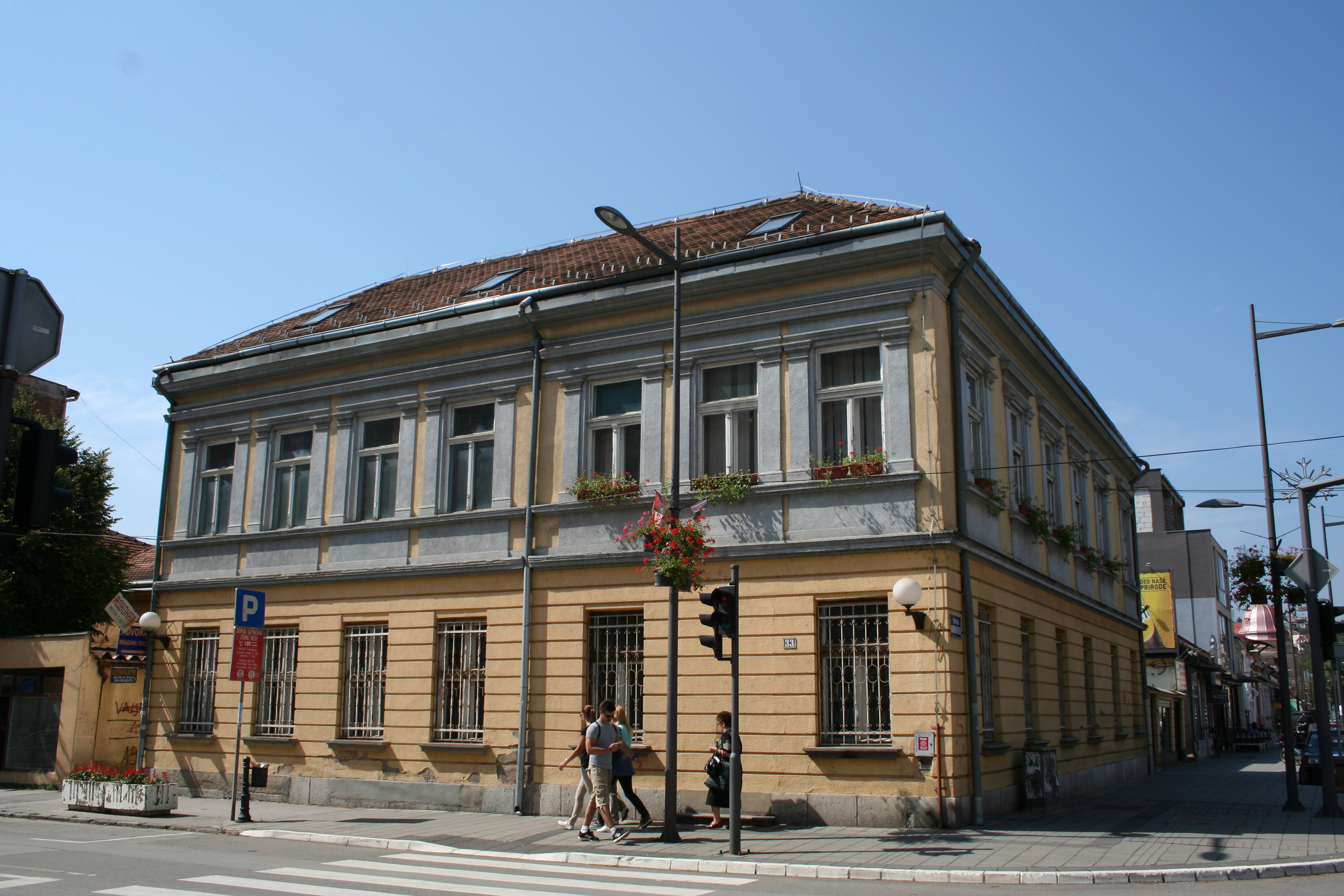
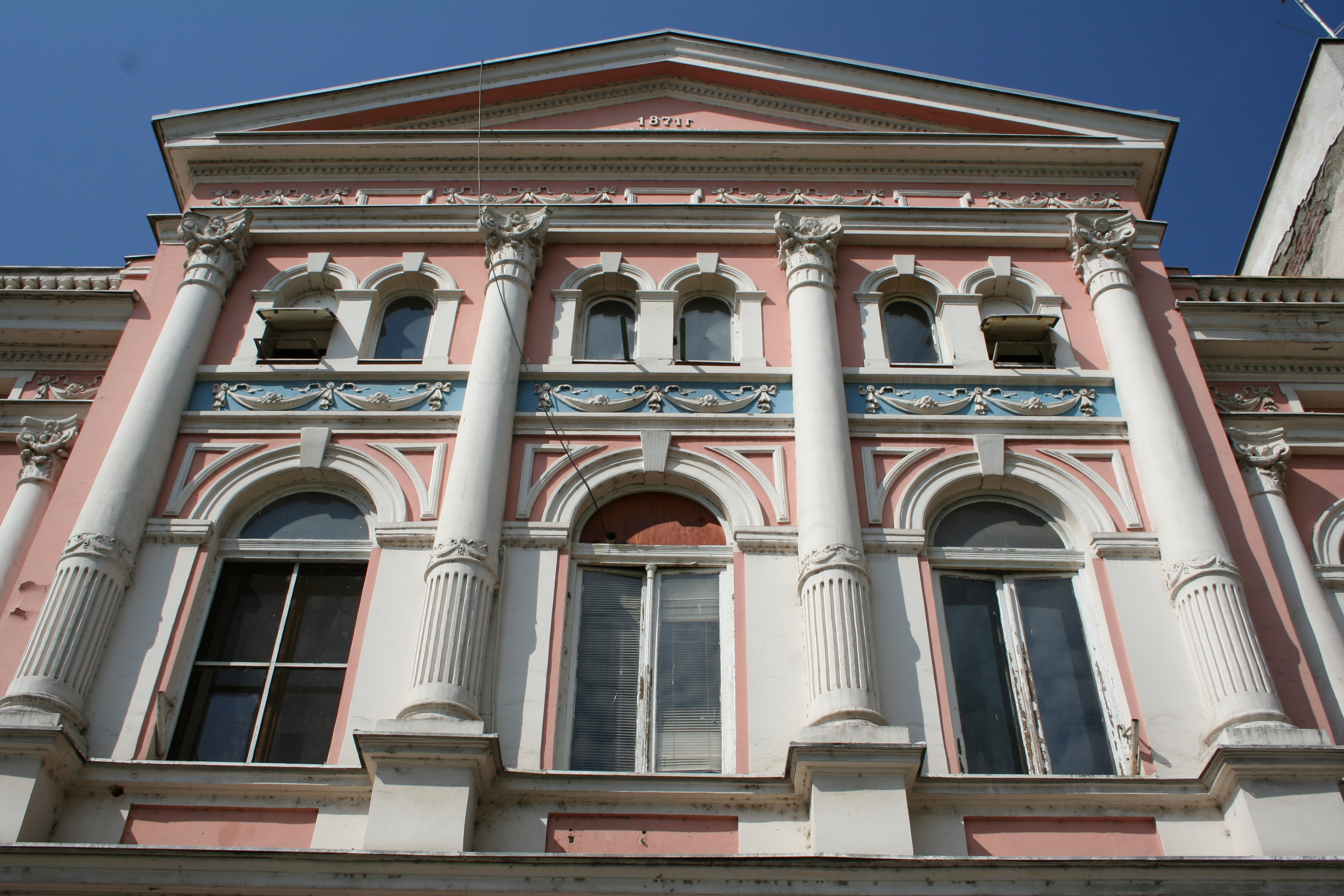
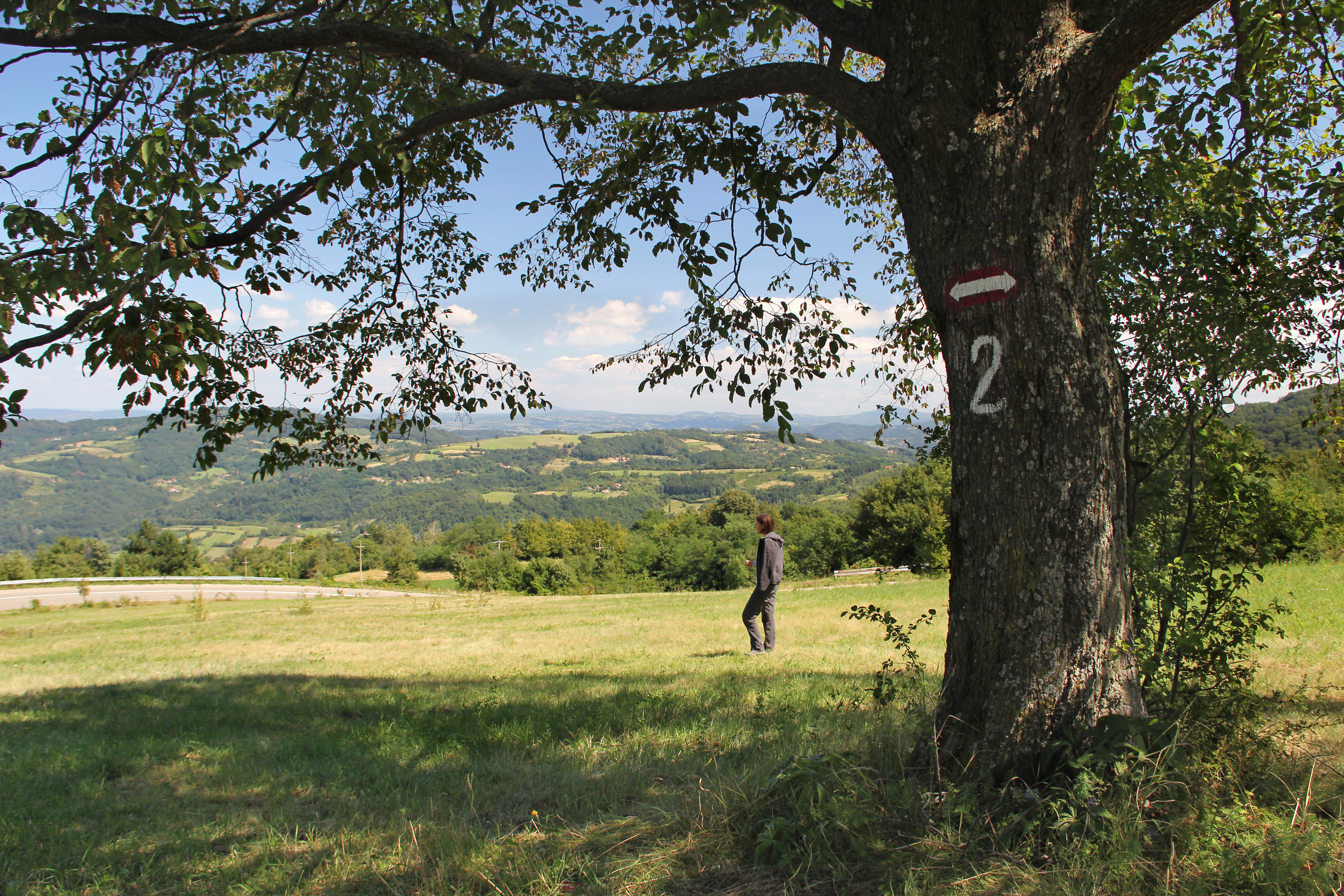
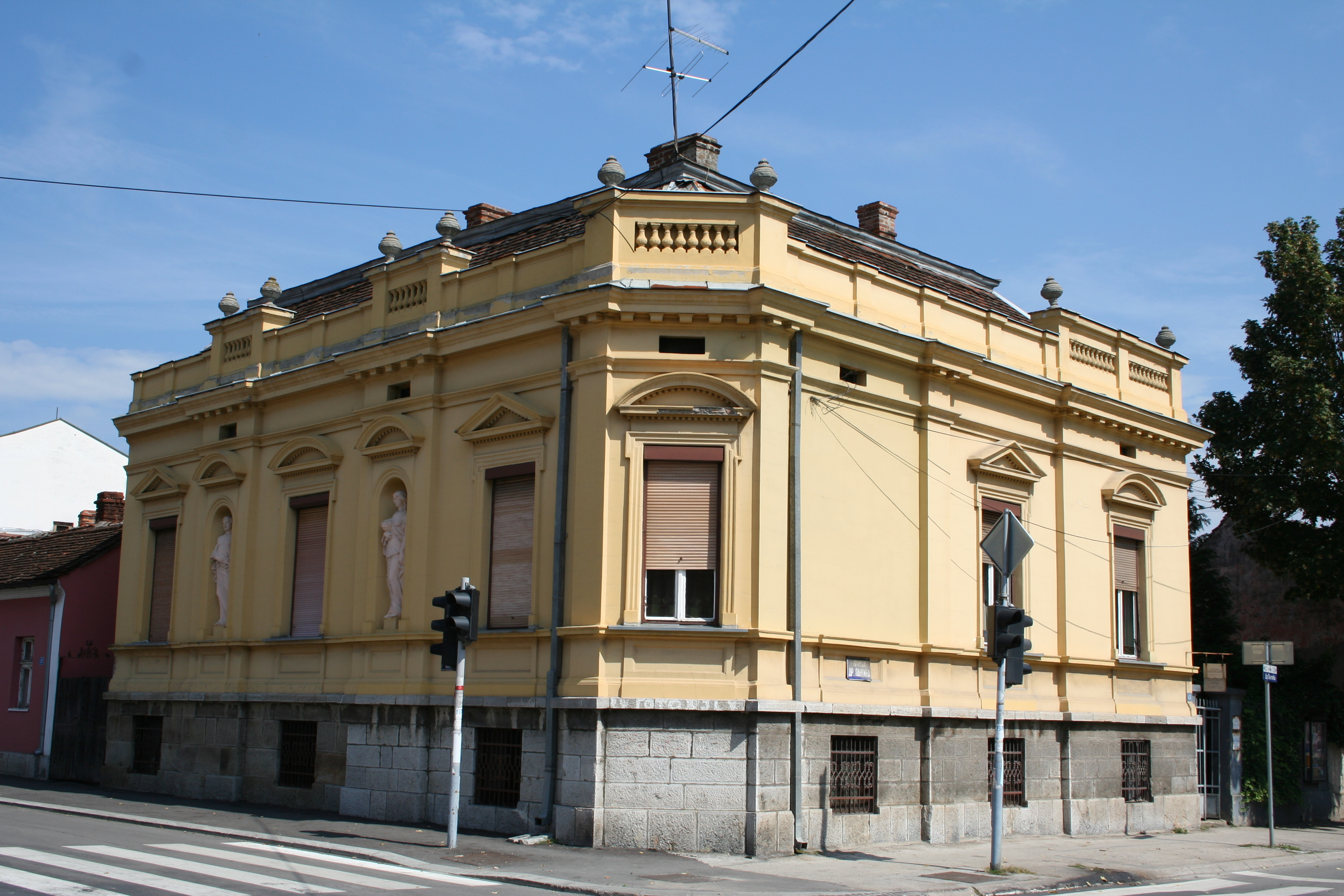
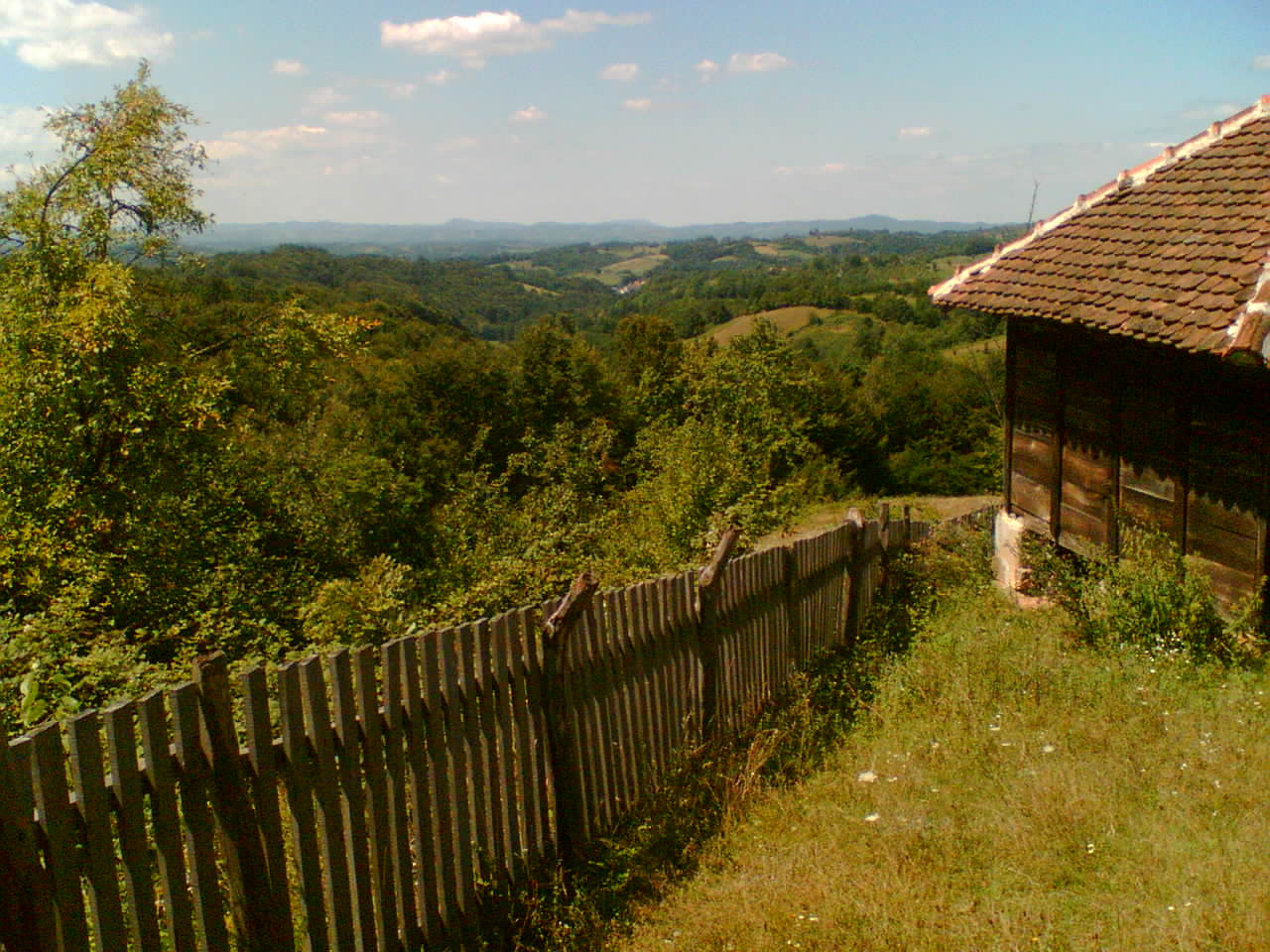
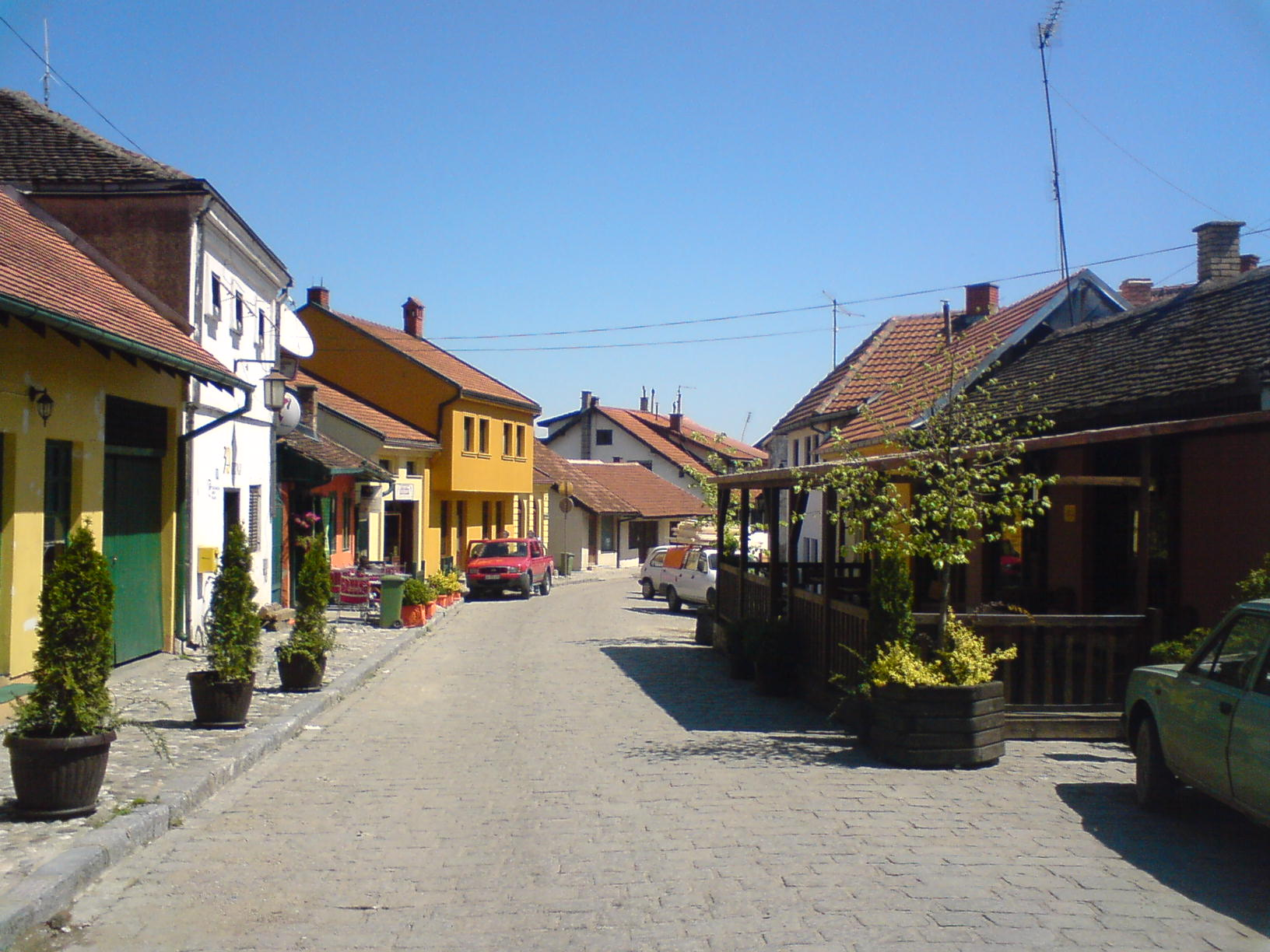
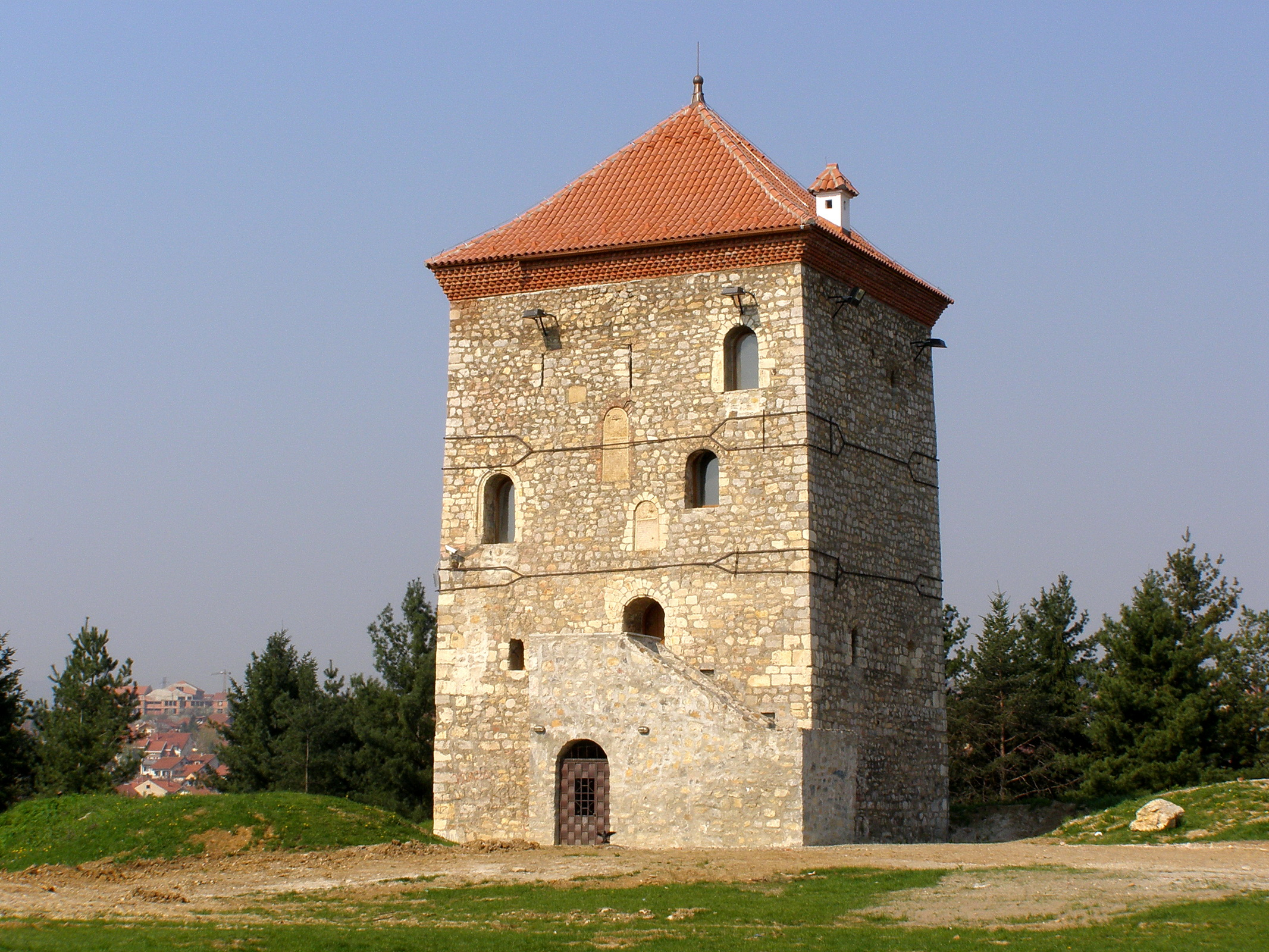
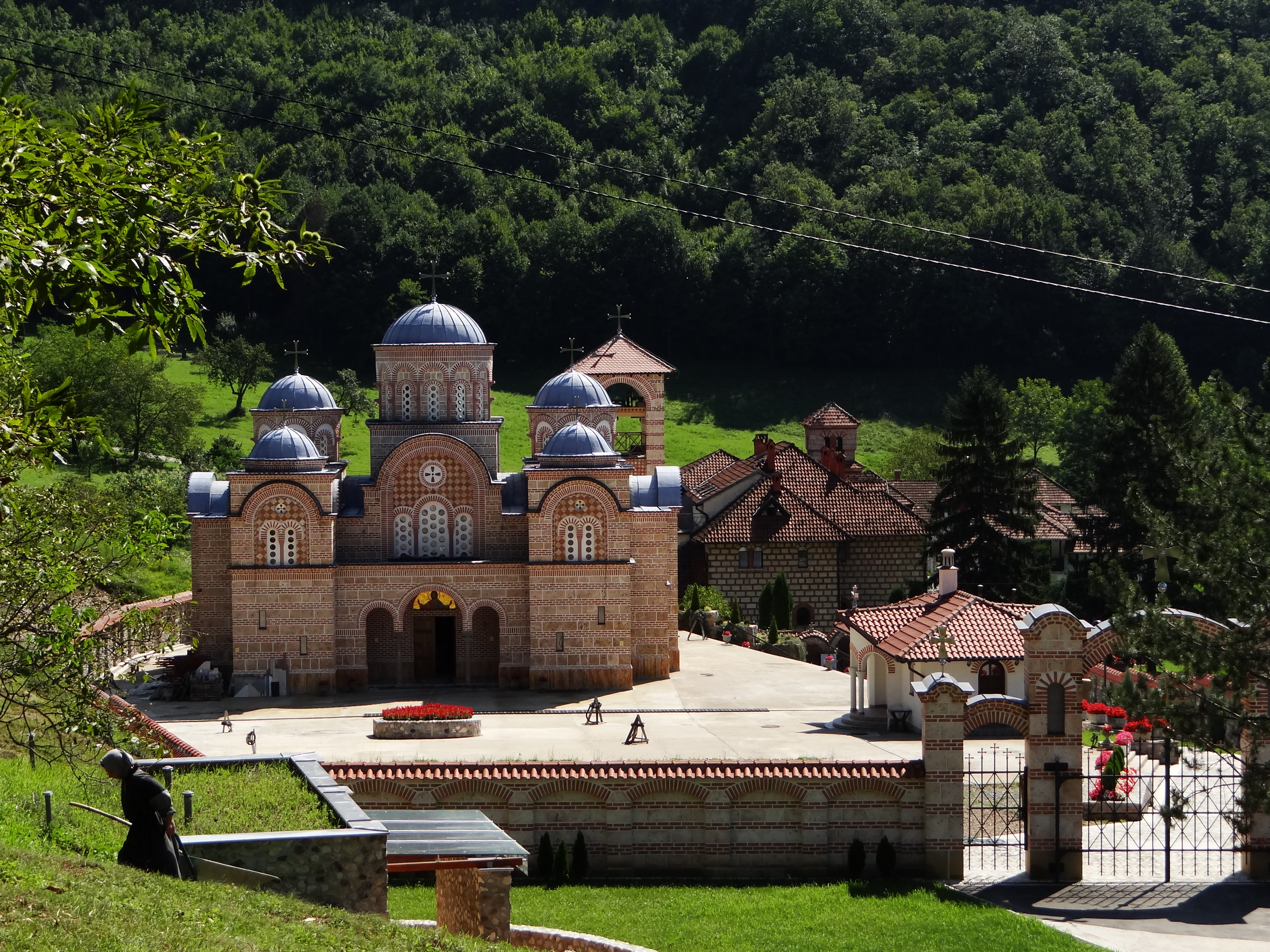
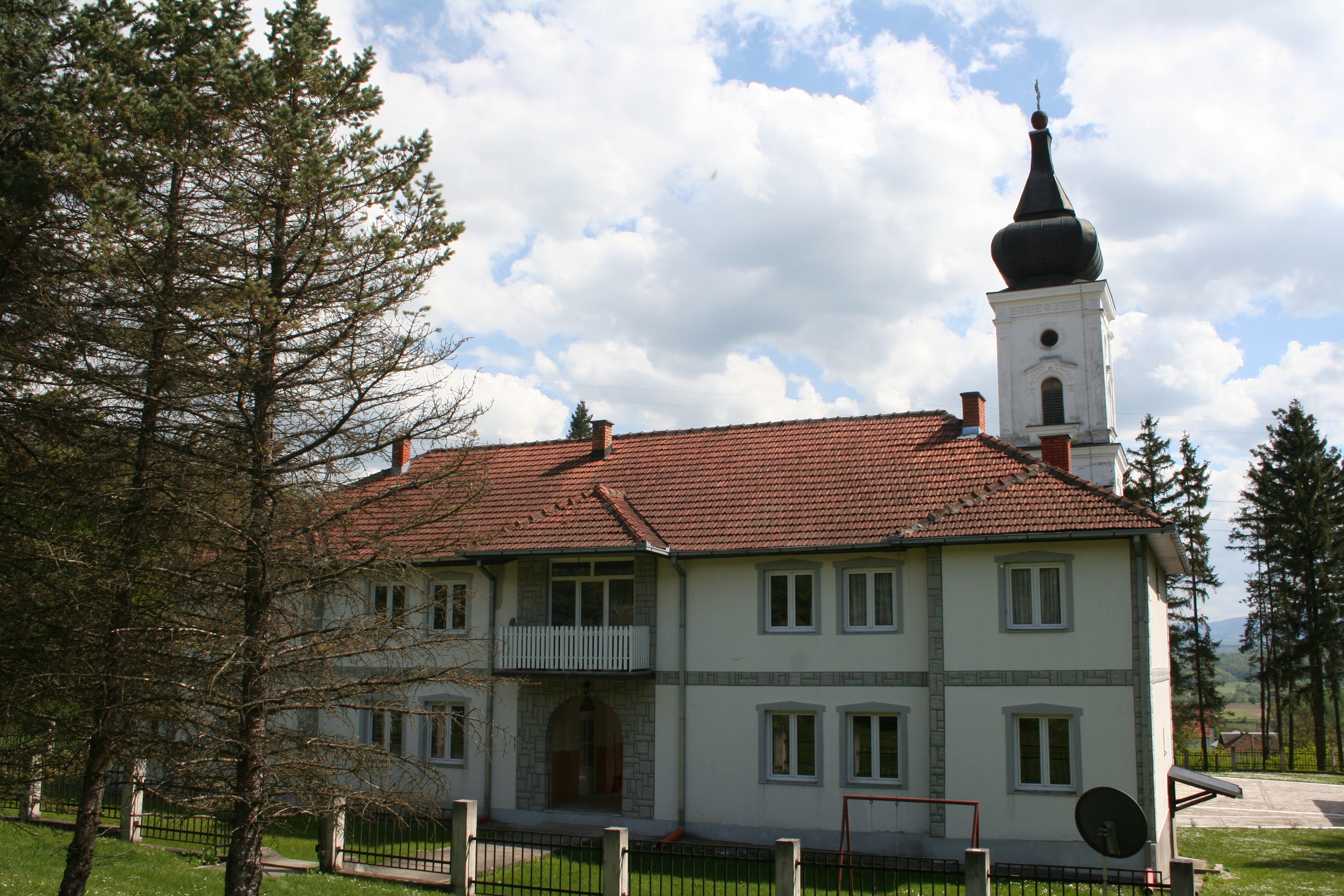
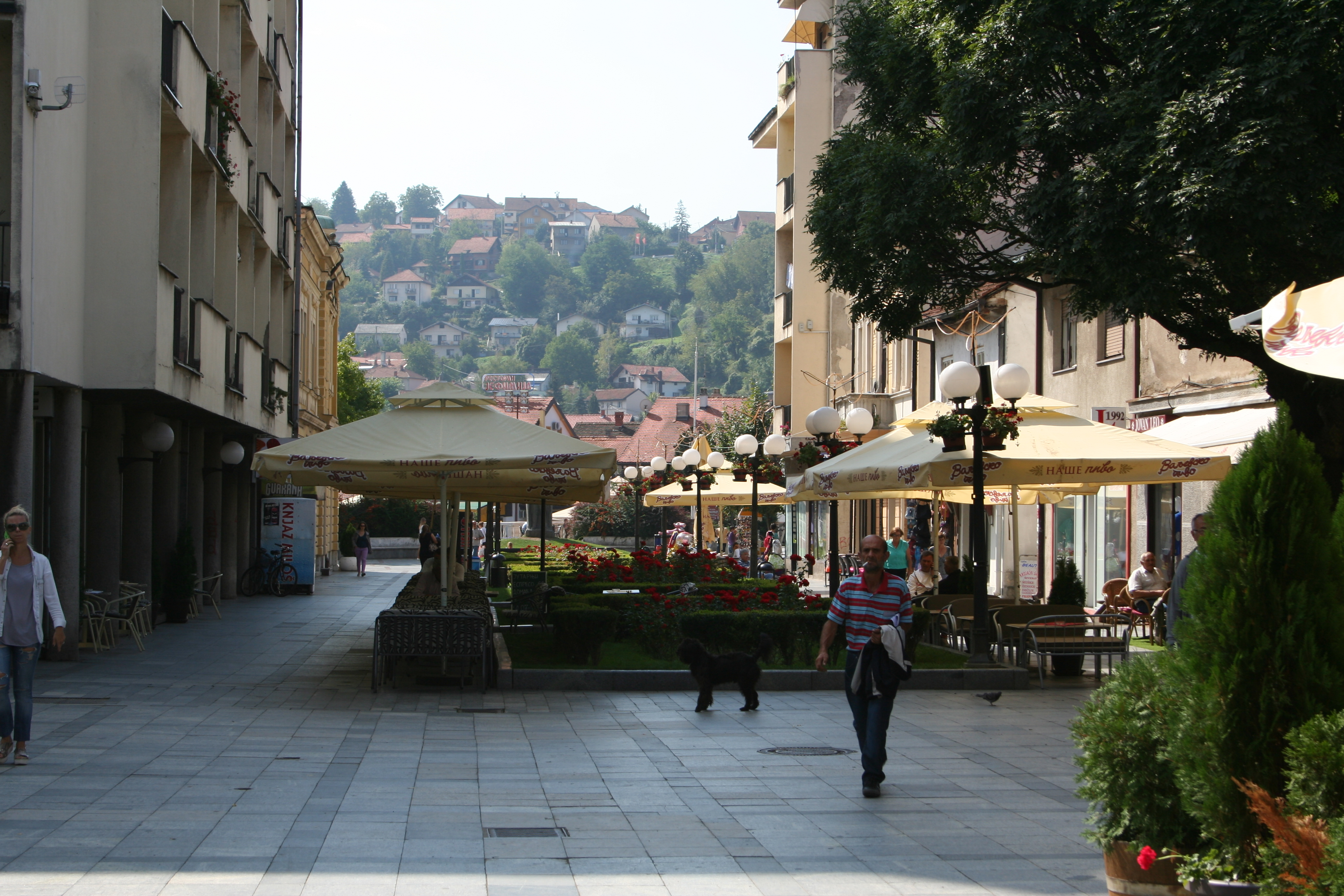
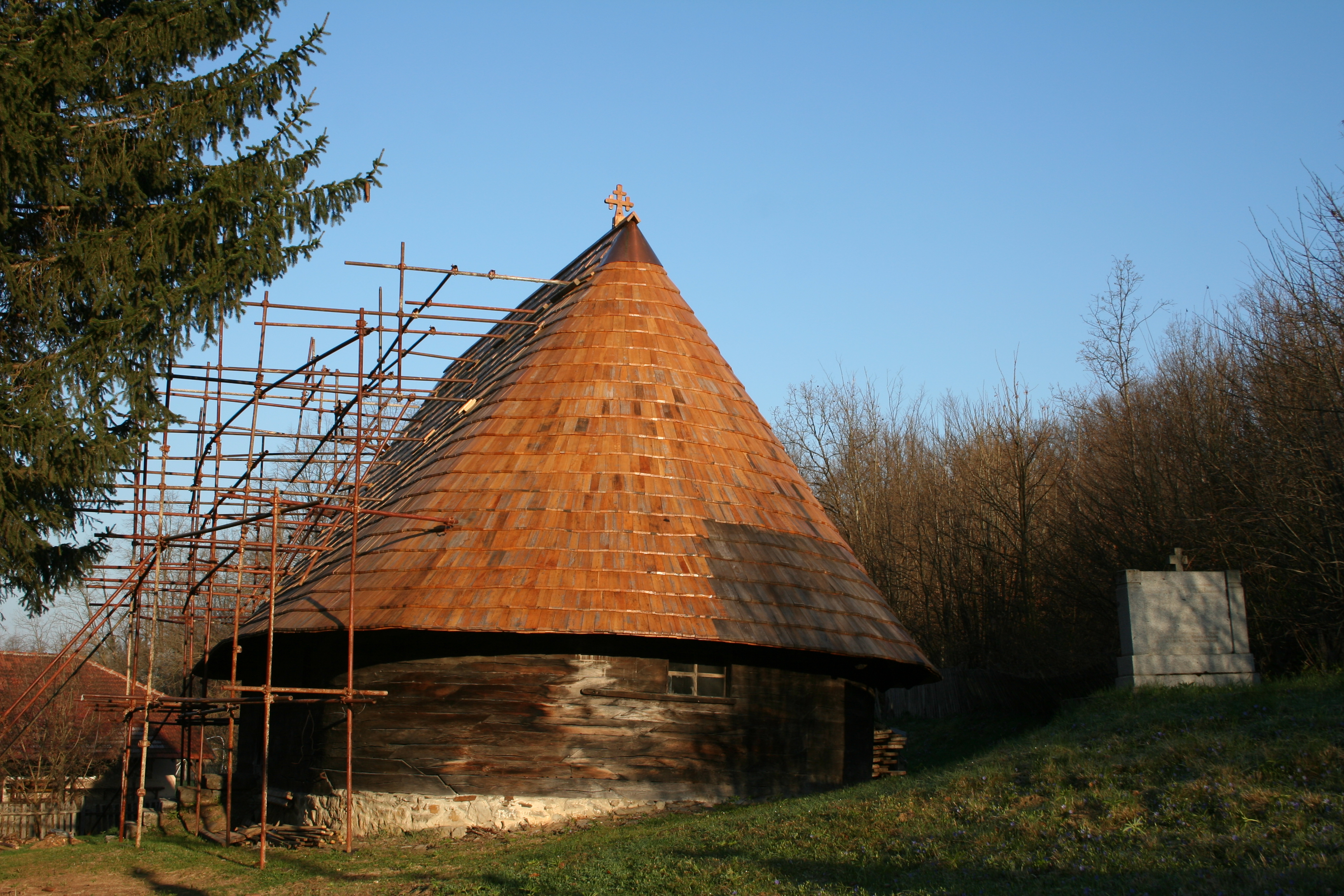
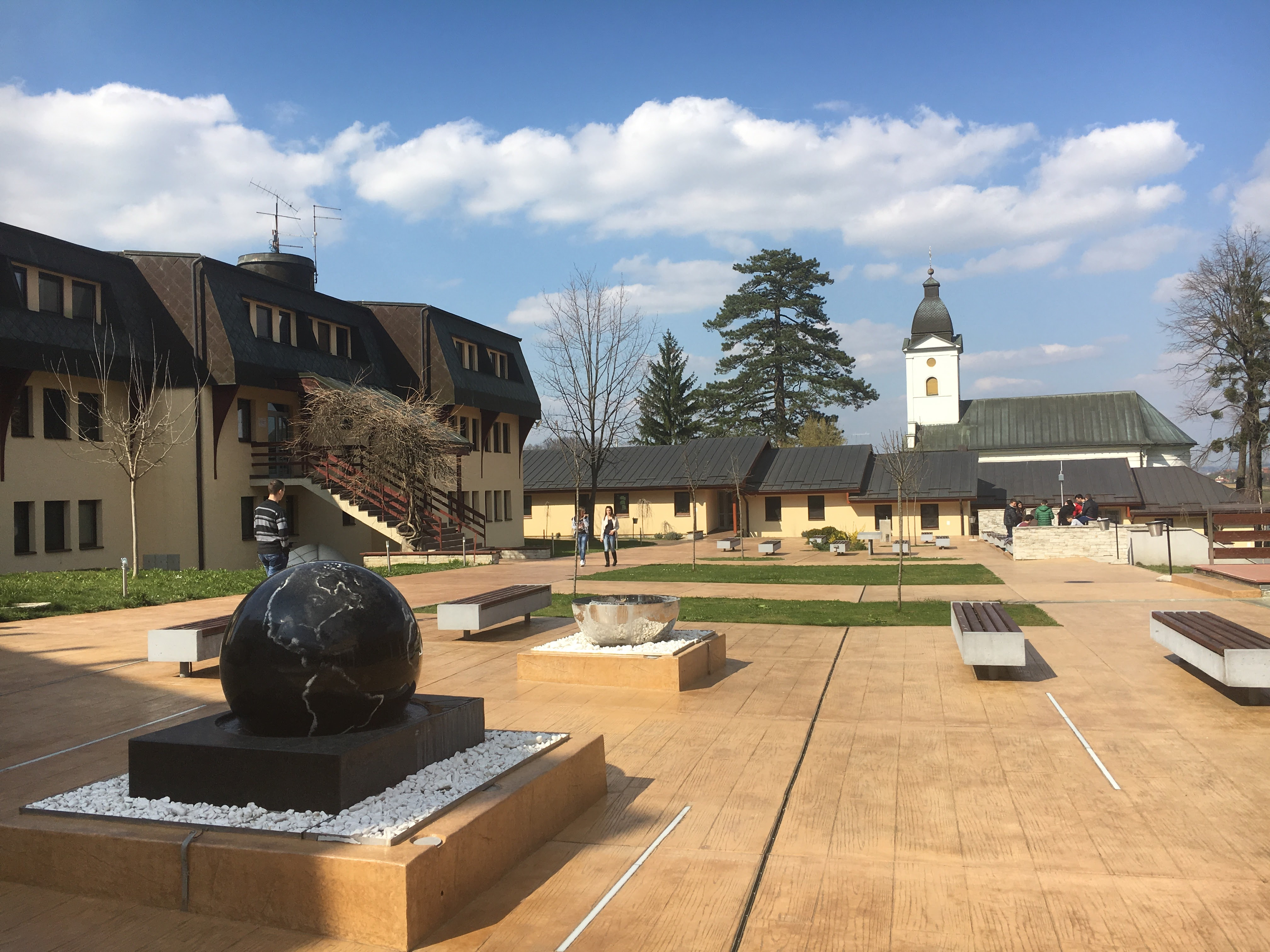
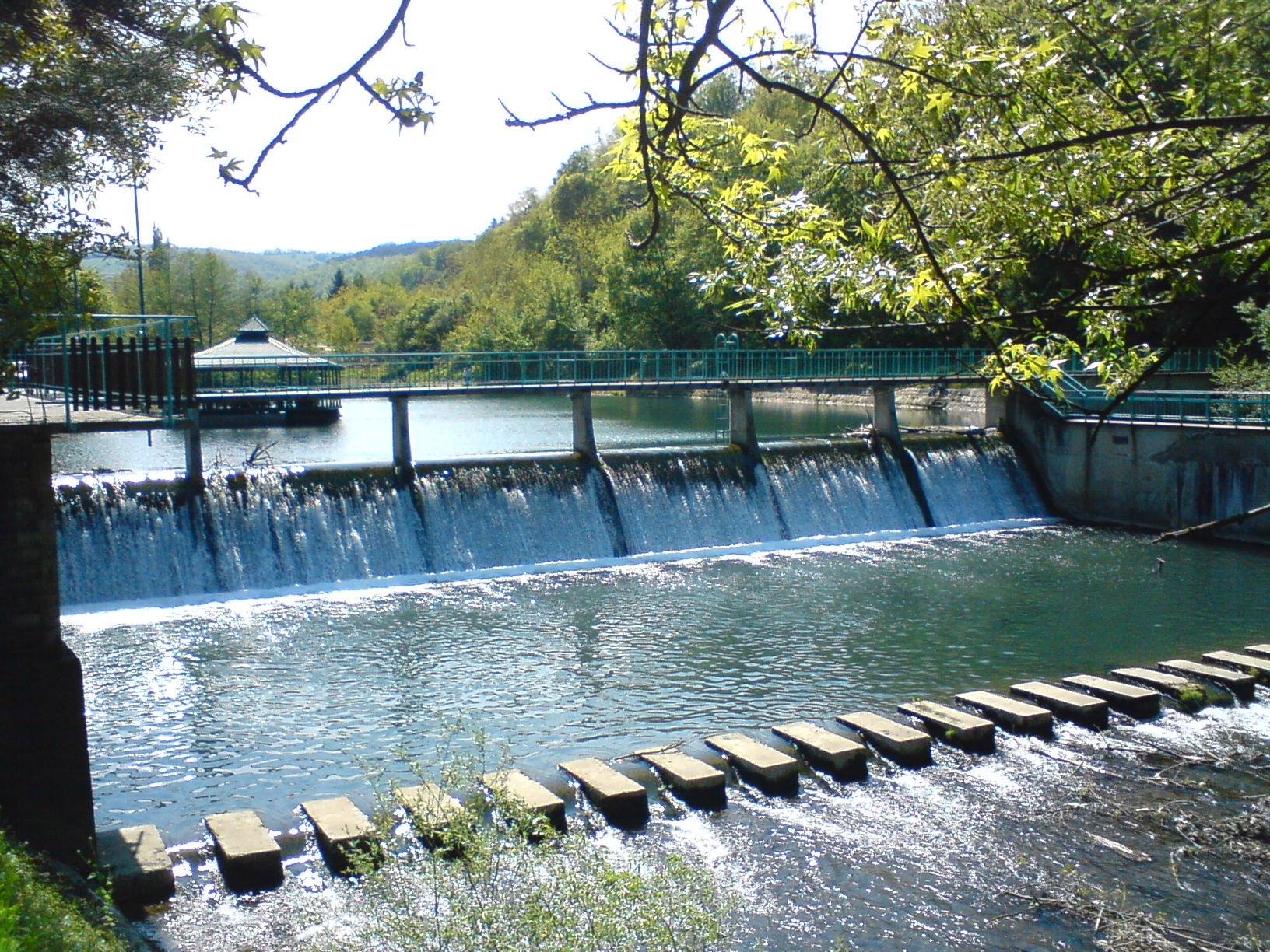
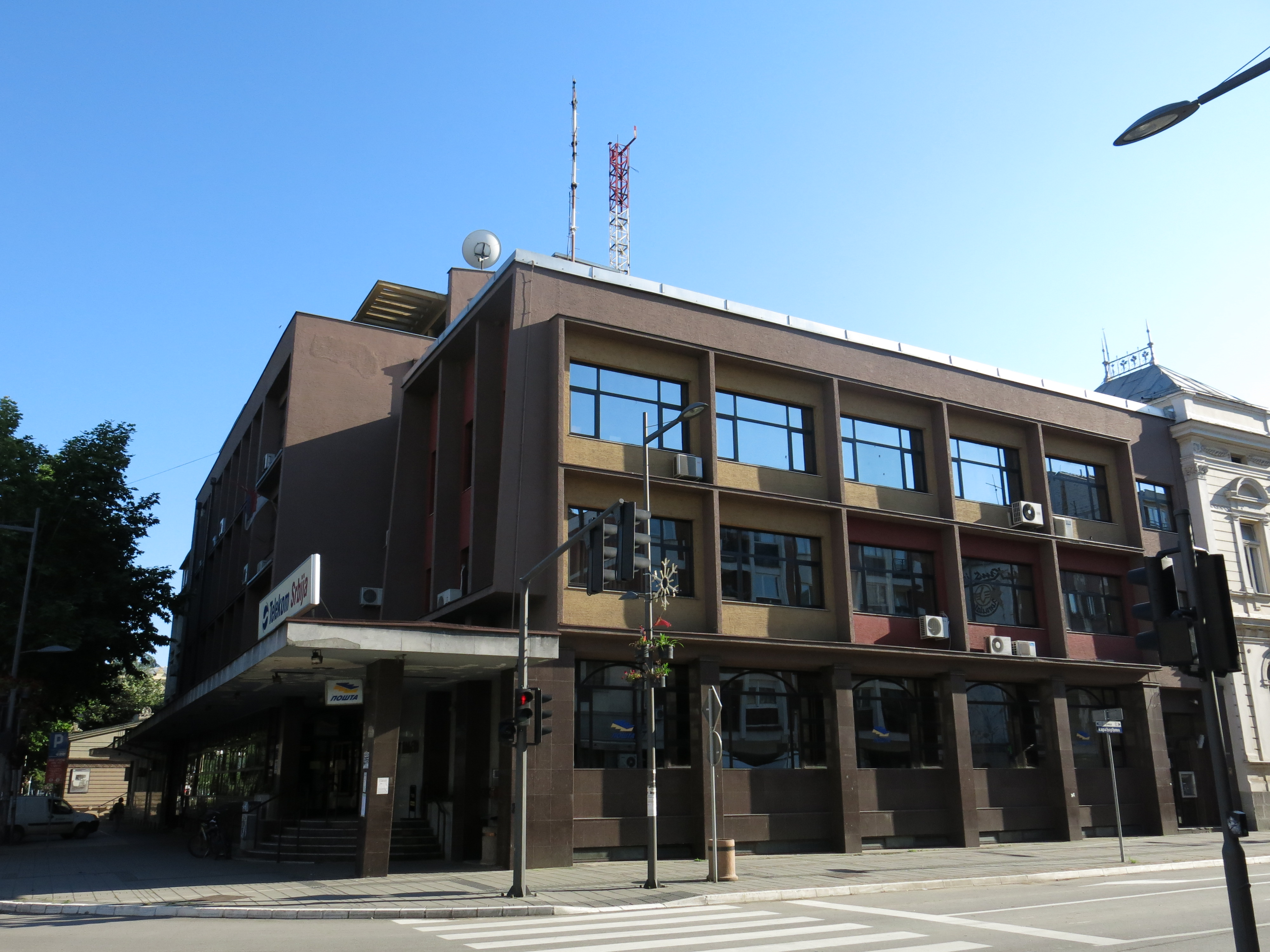
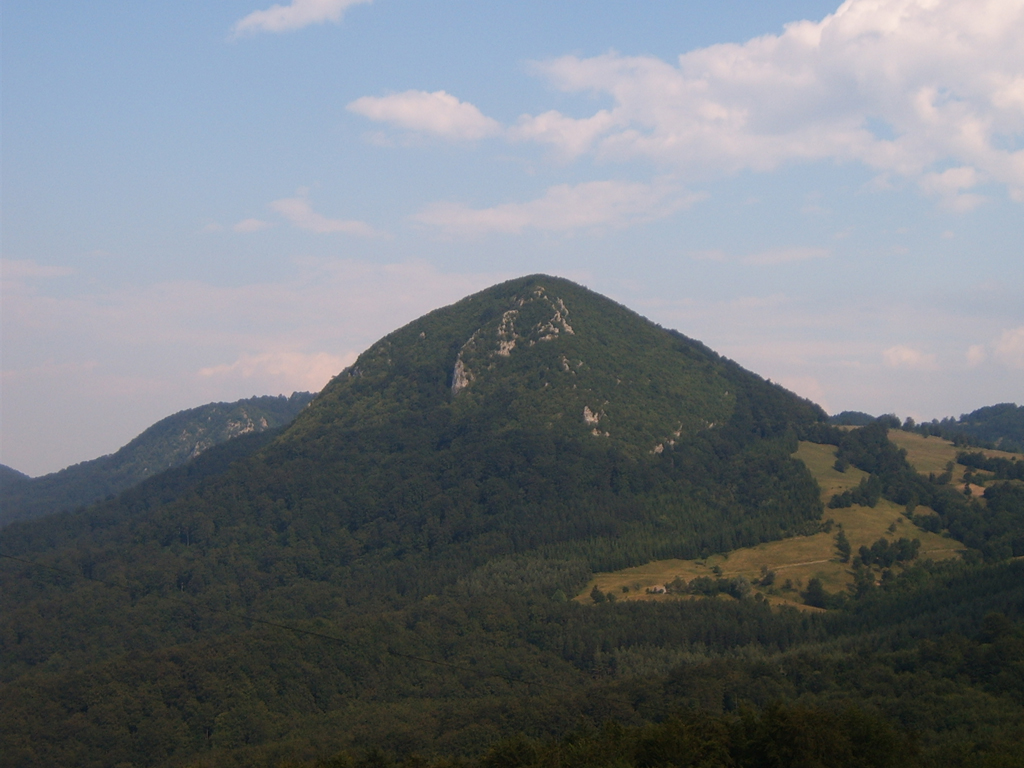
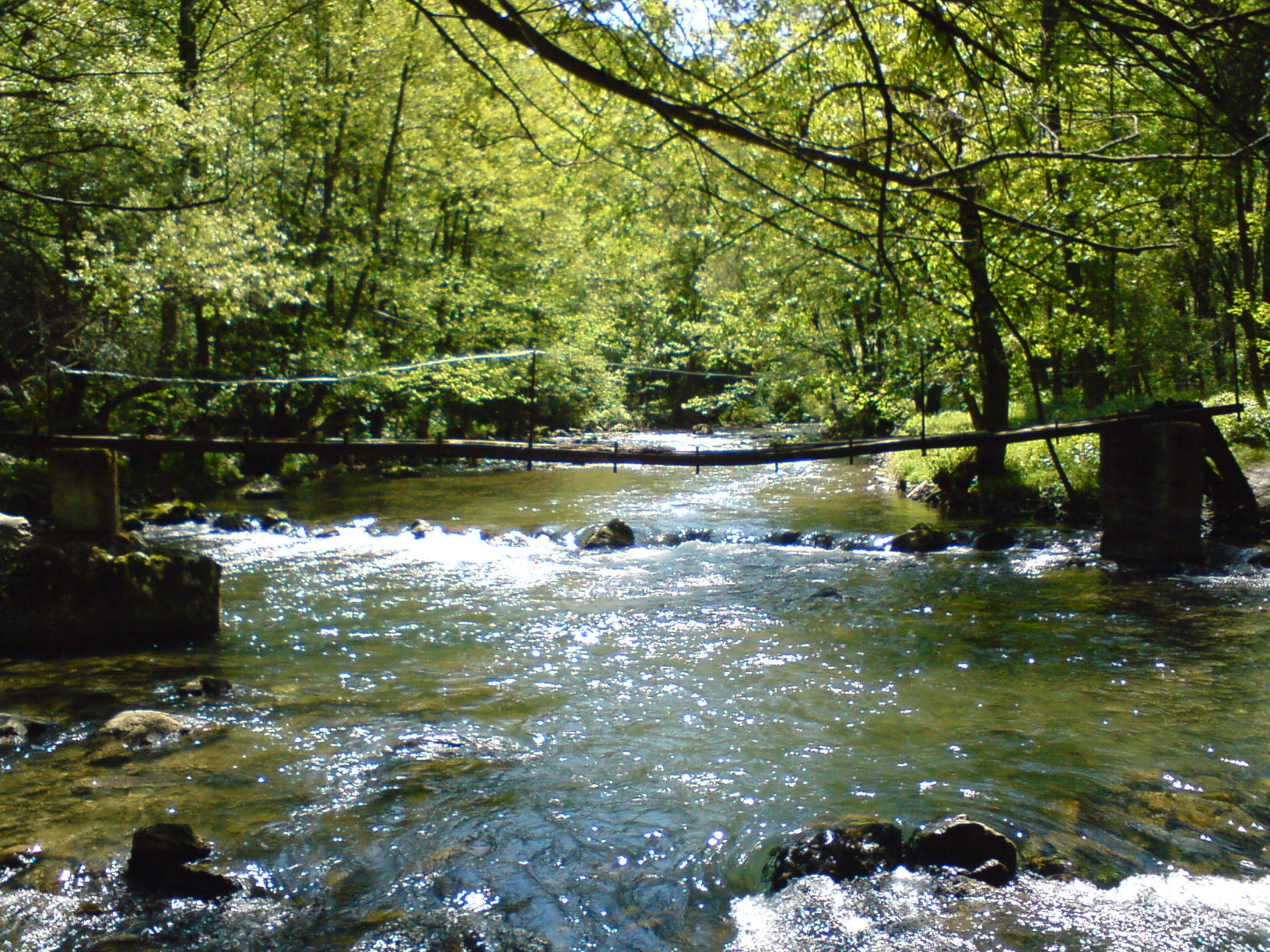
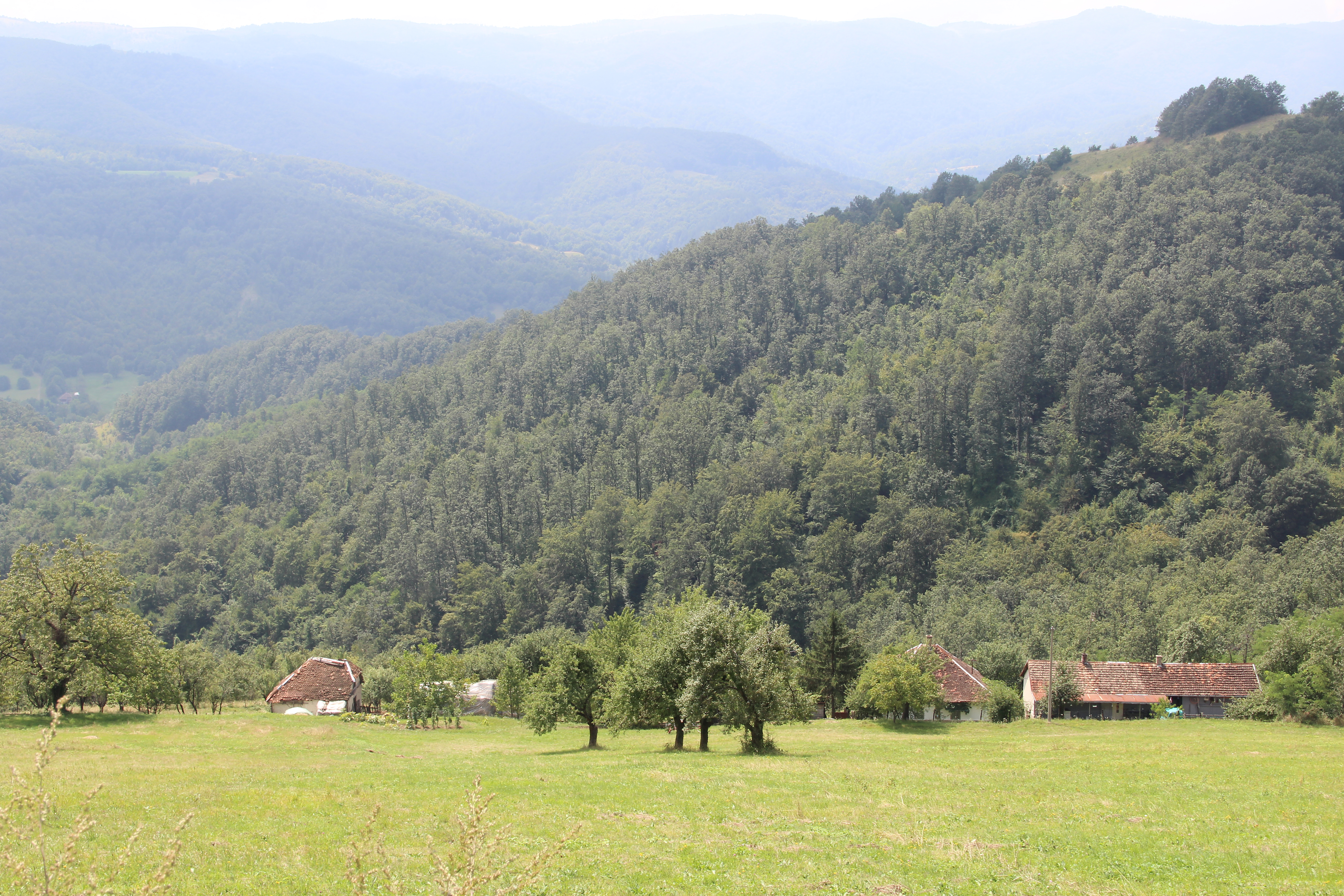
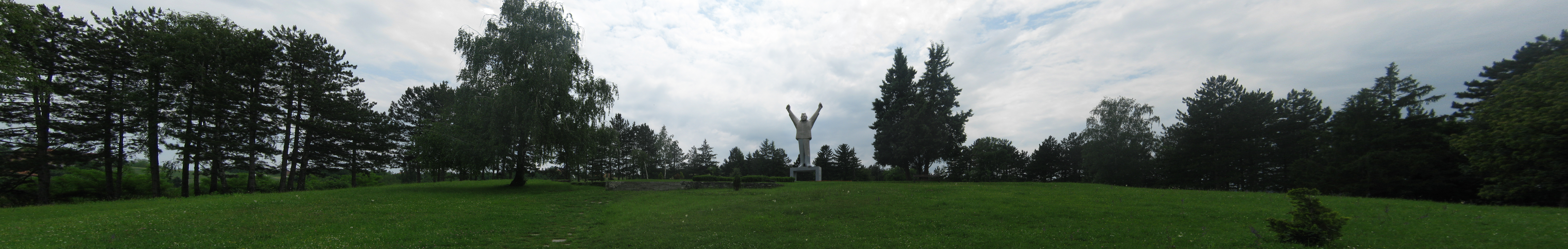
- Images from the Kolubara District

- Location of district in Serbia
- Coordinates: 44°16′N 19°53′E
- Country: Serbia
- Administrative center: Valjevo

Government
  - Commissioner: Goran Milivojević

Area
  - Total: 2,474 km^{2} (955 sq mi)

Population (2022)
  - Total: 154,497
  - Density: 70.5/km^{2} (183/sq mi)
- ISO 3166 code: RS-09
- Municipalities: 5 and 1 city
- Settlements: 218
- Cities and towns: 7
- Villages: 211
- Website: kolubarski.okrug.gov.rs

The Kolubara District (Serbian: Колубарски округ, romanized: Kolubarski okrug, pronounced [kɔlǔbarskiː ôkruːɡ]) is one of administrative districts of Serbia. It occupies the central part of western Serbia. According to the 2022 census, it has a population of 154,497 inhabitants. The administrative center of the Kolubara District is the city of Valjevo.

== History ==
The present-day administrative districts (including Kolubara District) were established in 1992 by the decree of the Government of Serbia.

== Cities and municipalities ==
The Kolubara District encompasses the territories of one city and five municipalities:

- Valjevo (city)
- Lajkovac (municipality)
- Ljig (municipality)
- Mionica (municipality)
- Osečina (municipality)
- Ub (municipality)

== Demographics ==
Historical population
Year	Pop.	±% p.a.
1948	192,572	—
1953	201,411	+0.90%
1961	202,630	+0.08%
1971	202,990	+0.02%
1981	205,094	+0.10%
1991	200,560	−0.22%
2002	192,204	−0.39%
2011	174,513	−1.07%
2022	154,497	−1.10%

=== Towns ===
There is just one town with over 10,000 inhabitants: Valjevo, with 56,145 inhabitants.

=== Ethnic structure ===
Ethnicity	Population	Share
Serbs	144,025	93.2%
Roma	3,288	2.1%
Others	996	0.6%
Undeclared/Unknown	6,188	4%

== See also ==
- Administrative districts of Serbia
- Administrative divisions of Serbia
