= State Road 27 (Serbia) =

Road in Serbia

State Road 27
- Serbian: Državni put IB reda 27; Serbian Cyrillic: Државни пут IБ реда 27

Route information
- Part of E763 Ćelije-Lazarevac
- Maintained by JP "Putevi Srbije"
- Length: 216.290 km (134.396 mi)

Major junctions
- From: Bosnia and Herzegovina-Serbia border at Trbušnica M-14-1 / M-19
- To: Svilajnac

Location
- Country: Serbia
- Districts: Mačva, Kolubara, City of Belgrade, Šumadija, Podunavlje, Pomoravlje

Highway system
- Roads in Serbia; Motorways
← 26	→ 28

State Road 27 is an IB-class road in western, northern, central and eastern Serbia, connecting Bosnia and Herzegovina at Trbušnica with Svilajnac. It is located in Šumadija and Western Serbia, Belgrade and Southern and Eastern Serbia regions.

Before the new road categorization regulation given in 2013, the route wore the following names: M 14.1, M 19 and M 4 (before 2012) / 23, 21, 13, A2, 16, 150 and 132 (after 2012).

The existing route is a main road with two traffic lanes. By the valid Space Plan of Republic of Serbia the road is not planned for upgrading to motorway, and is expected to be conditioned in its current state.

Section from Ćelije to Lazarevac is a part of European route E763.

== Sections ==
Section number	Length	Distance	Section name
02701	0.324 km (0.201 mi)	0.324 km (0.201 mi)	Bosnia and Herzegovina-Serbia border (Trbušnica) - Loznica (Trbušnica)
02617	6.628 km (4.118 mi)	6.952 km (4.320 mi)	Loznica (Trbušnica) - Loznica (entrance) (overlap with)
02702	4.898 km (3.043 mi)	11.850 km (7.363 mi)	Loznica (entrance) - Loznica
02703	2.738 km (1.701 mi)	14.588 km (9.065 mi)	Loznica - Žeravija (Tršić)
02704	3.110 km (1.932 mi)	17.698 km (10.997 mi)	Žeravija (Tršić) - Krst
02705	19.641 km (12.204 mi)	37.339 km (23.201 mi)	Krst - Zavlaka (Tekeriš)
02706	0.622 km (0.386 mi)	37.961 km (23.588 mi)	Zavlaka (Tekeriš) - Zavlaka (Mojković)
02707	13.585 km (8.441 mi)	51.546 km (32.029 mi)	Zavlaka (Mojković) - Osečina (Jadar)
02708	0.431 km (0.268 mi)	51.977 km (32.297 mi)	Osečina (Jadar) - Osečina
02709	2.820 km (1.752 mi)	54.797 km (34.049 mi)	Osečina - Osečina (Osladić)
02710	10.144 km (6.303 mi)	64.941 km (40.352 mi)	Osečina (Osladić) - Donja Kamenica
02711	5.354 km (3.327 mi)	70.295 km (43.679 mi)	Donja Kamenica - Pričević
02712	13.853 km (8.608 mi)	84.148 km (52.287 mi)	Pričević - Valjevo (Gola Glava)
02713	0.211 km (0.131 mi)	84.359 km (52.418 mi)	Valjevo (Gola Glava) - Valjevo (Jovanja)
02714	0.521 km (0.324 mi)	84.880 km (52.742 mi)	Valjevo (Jovanja) - Valjevo (Brankovina)
02124	3.586 km (2.228 mi)	88.466 km (54.970 mi)	Valjevo (Brankovina) - Valjevo (bypass) (overlap with)
02715	3.825 km (2.377 mi)	92.291 km (57.347 mi)	Valjevo (bypass) - Popučke
02716	5.133 km (3.189 mi)	97.424 km (60.536 mi)	Popučke - Divci
02717	7.222 km (4.488 mi)	104.646 km (65.024 mi)	Divci - Slovac
02718	5.737 km (3.565 mi)	110.383 km (68.589 mi)	Slovac - Lajkovac (entrance)
02719	1.656 km (1.029 mi)	112.039 km (69.618 mi)	Lajkovac (entrance) - Lajkovac
02720	2.765 km (1.718 mi)	114.804 km (71.336 mi)	Lajkovac - Ćelije
02209	4.486 km (2.787 mi)	119.290 km (74.123 mi)	Ćelije - Lazarevac (Ibar road) (overlap with)
02721	3.420 km (2.125 mi)	122.710 km (76.248 mi)	Lazarevac (Ibar road) - Lazarevac
02722	19.664 km (12.219 mi)	142.374 km (88.467 mi)	Lazarevac - Darosava (Belanovica)
02723	0.167 km (0.104 mi)	142.541 km (88.571 mi)	Darosava (Belanovica) - Darosava (Venčane)
02724	8.278 km (5.144 mi)	150.819 km (93.715 mi)	Darosava (Venčane) - Aranđelovac (Belanovica)
02725	0.519 km (0.322 mi)	151.338 km (94.037 mi)	Aranđelovac (Belanovica) - Aranđelovac (Ranilović)
02726	2.093 km (1.301 mi)	153.431 km (95.338 mi)	Aranđelovac (Ranilović) - Aranđelovac (Donja Šatornja)
02727	1.574 km (0.978 mi)	155.005 km (96.316 mi)	Aranđelovac (Donja Šatornja) - Aranđelovac (Orašac)
02728	8.744 km (5.433 mi)	163.749 km (101.749 mi)	Aranđelovac (Orašac) - Krćevac
02507	4.515 km (2.805 mi)	168.264 km (104.554 mi)	Krćevac - Topola (overlap with)
02508	1.034 km (0.642 mi)	169.298 km (105.197 mi)	Topola - Topola (Natalinci) (overlap with (overlap with)
02729	10.113 km (6.284 mi)	179.411 km (111.481 mi)	Topola (Natalinci) - Natalinci
02730	16.902 km (10.502 mi)	196.313 km (121.983 mi)	Natalinci - Adrovac
02731	1.028 km (0.639 mi)	197.341 km (122.622 mi)	Adrovac - Rača
02732	0.290 km (0.180 mi)	197.631 km (122.802 mi)	Rača - Rača (Cerovac)
02733	9.573 km (5.948 mi)	207.204 km (128.751 mi)	Rača (Cerovac) - Markovac (Velika Plana)
02734	0.337 km (0.209 mi)	207.541 km (128.960 mi)	Markovac (Velika Plana) - Markovac (Lapovo)
02735	2.261 km (1.405 mi)	209.802 km (130.365 mi)	Markovac (Lapovo) - Markovac interchange
02736	6.488 km (4.031 mi)	216.290 km (134.396 mi)	Markovac interchange - Svilajnac

== See also ==
- Roads in Serbia
- European route E763
