= Dragiša Stanisavljević =

Serbian sculptor

Dragiša Stanisavljević Драгиша Станисављевић
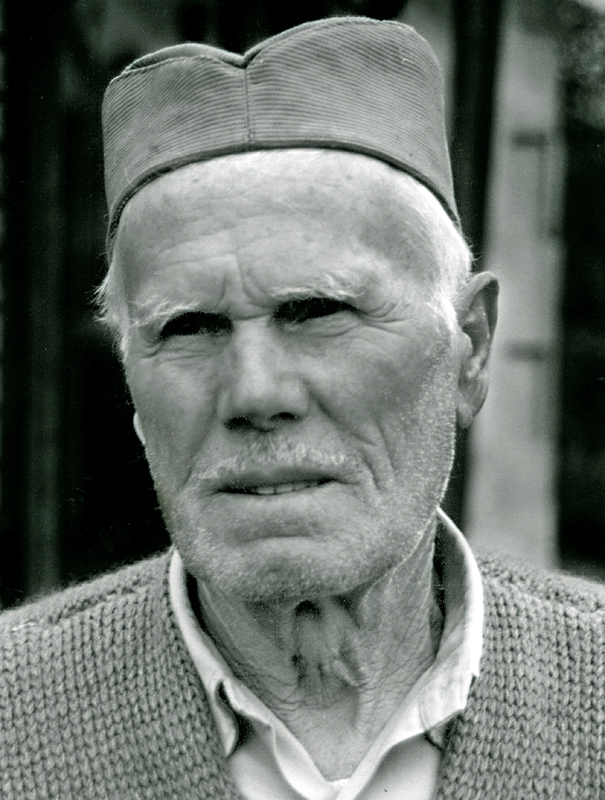
- Dragiša Stanisavljević
- Born: Dragiša Stanisavljević; May 25, 1921; Jabučje, Lajkovac
- Died: August 21, 2012 (aged 91); Jabučje, Lajkovac
- Known for: Sculptor
- Movement: Outsider art, Naive art
- Website: ,

Dragiša Stanisavljević (May 25, 1921 – August 21, 2012) is an internationally known Serbian naïve and outsider sculptor.

== Biography ==
Dragiša Stanisavljević was born in Jabučje, near Lajkovac, on May 25, 1921. He began doing sculpture in 1958. The life in the village under patriarchal principles, century-old forests of his homeland certainly encouraged his impulse for freedom and modelling. He is an absolute self-taught, with strong sense for the stylization of form. A farmer by trade, Stanisavljević began to do sculpture in wood in 1958. Stanisavljević died in his native Jabučje (Serbia), on August 21, 2012. He is a world classic.

== Artistic Style and Work ==
Frontal aspect, simplicity of expression and archaic approach to form are unconsciously achieved. From black, age-old tree-trunks the artist liberated the form, polished it to brightness, imprisoned it and emphasized its organic essence, thus completing what the nature had begun. Everything is stylized nearly to the bare, basic primordial form, and reduced with the pronounced sense for measure, which was known only to authentic artists of primitive cultures. More than five-decade-long instinctive and creative work of this artist points to the force of his authentic and original forms and the connection between primordial and modern sensibility of artistic expression. Age-old oak trunks which he tooled from the bed of the Kolubara River had a secret trace in its very substance, a kind of patina. With a pronounced sense of harmony, without gestures, expressive movements, but with interest in the spiritual background of his figures, Dragiša unconsciously understood the role of form in the achievement of the universal. Relief-like concept of form with pronounced vertical composition helped the artist with the simplicity of expression, especially when the selected motif was philosophical contemplation on human relationships, destinies, hidden characteristics, sins or prayers. His works reflect the mythology, folklore and legends of his native land.

== Exhibitions and awards ==
Significant sculptures of Dragisa Stanisavljević are part of the collections of the Museum of Naïve and Marginal Art, Jagodina. From 1964, he had independent and group exhibitions in the country and abroad and he participated in nearly all international shows of art and [outsider art] (World Triennials in Bratislava from the sixties, thematic exhibitions in Martighi, Paris, Prague, Budapest etc.). He received many awards and recognition for his monumental sculptures, among which the Award for Entire Artistic Work at the Tenth Biennial of Naïve and Marginal Art in Jagodina, 2011 was the most significant.

== Gallery ==
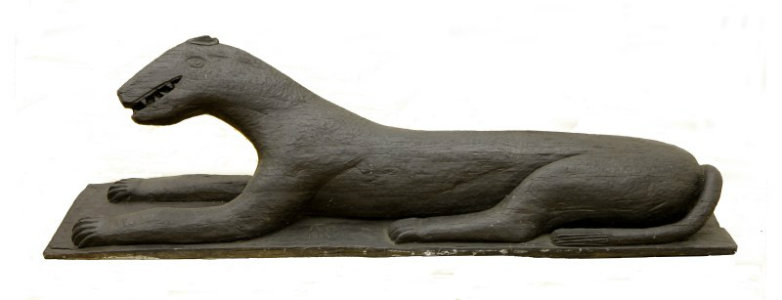
Black Panther, 1975,
wood, 150x50cm
MNMA, Jagodina

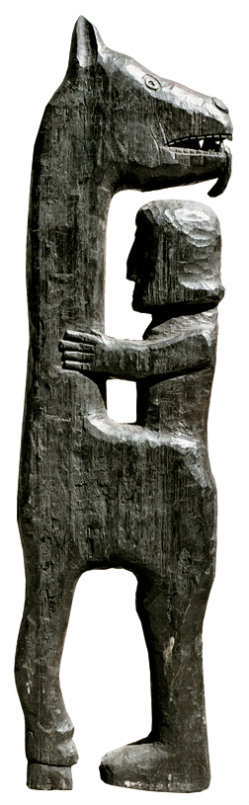
Cooperation, 1979,
wood, height 110 cm
MNMA, Jagodina

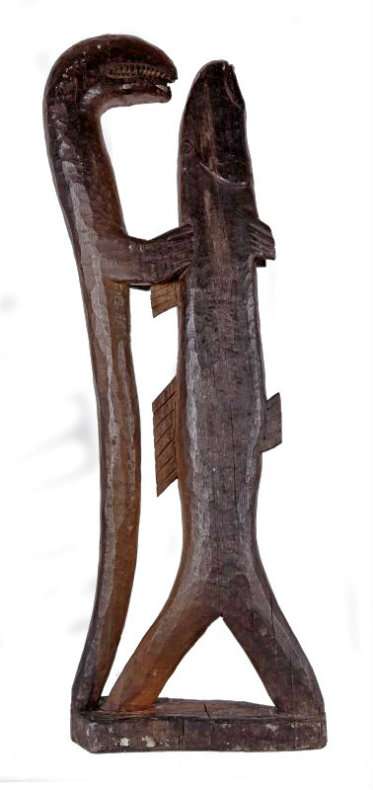
Snake and Fish,
wood, height 105 cm
MNMA, Jagodina

== Literature ==
- М. Бошковић; М. Маширевић, Самоуки ликовни уметници у Србији, Торино,1977
- Oto Bihalji-Merin; Небојша Бато Томашевић, Енциклопедија наивне уметности света, Београд, 1984
- Марица Врачевић, Драгиша Станисављевић, catalogue, MNMA, Јагодина, 2002
- Н. Крстић, Наивна уметност Србије, SANU, MNMA, Jagodina, 2003
- Н.Крстић, Наивна и маргинална уметност Србије, MNMA, Јагодина, 2007
- Н.Крстић, Histoire de Voire, Dragiša Stanisavljević, catalogue, MNMA, Paris, 2012
- Н.Крстић, Outsiders, catalogue, MNMA, Јагодина, 2013
- N. Krstić, Outsider Art in Serbia, MNMA, Јагодина, 2014, pp. 132–139
