= Pepeljevac =

Pepeljevac may refer to:

- Pepeljevac (Kruševac), a village in Serbia
- Pepeljevac (Kuršumlija), a village in Serbia
- Pepeljevac (Lajkovac), a village in Serbia
