= Ratkovac =

Ratkovac can refer to:

- Ratkovac, Bosnia and Herzegovina, a village near Prnjavor, Bosnia and Herzegovina
- Ratkovac, Croatia, a village near Gornji Bogićevci
- Ratkovac, Lajkovac, a village in Serbia
- Ratkovac, Orahovac, a village in Kosovo
