= Skobalj =

Skobalj may refer to:

- Skobalj (Lajkovac), a village in Serbia
- Skobalj (Smederevo), a village in Serbia
