= Markova Crkva =

Markova Crkva Маркова Црква
- Village (Selo)
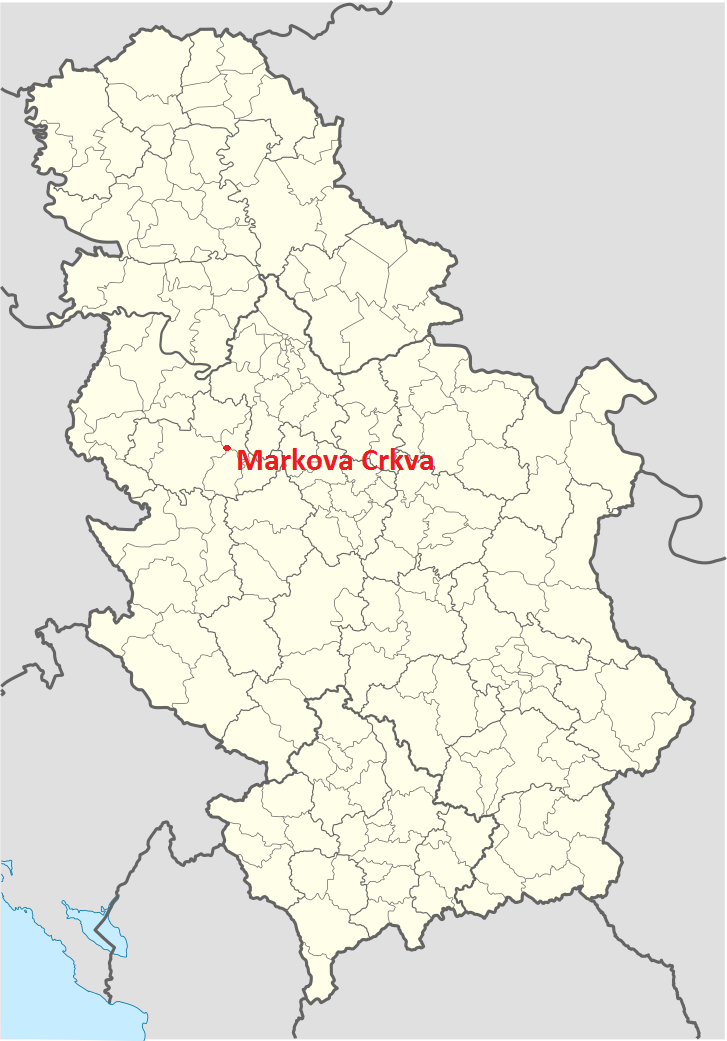
- Location of the village within Serbia
- Coordinates: 44°19′39″N 20°05′14″E
- Country: Serbia
- District: Kolubara District
- Municipality: Lajkovac
- Establishment: Late Medieval Era
- Elevation: 564 ft (172 m)

Population (2011)
  - Total: ▲111
- Time zone: UTC+1 (CET)
  - Summer (DST): UTC+2 (CEST)
- Postal code: 14223 and/or 14224
- Area code: + 381 14
- Car plates: VA

Markova Crkva is a village situated in Lajkovac municipality in Serbia.

== Demographics ==
It is by far the smallest of all settlements in the municipality in terms of, both areawise and populationwise. After the Population Census 2011. it is documented that there are 119 people in Markova Crkva, out of which 111 are permanent residents, while 8 (eight) are outside of the country, chiefly because of their working arrangements in Austria, Switzerland and other places in Europe.

There are 39 occupied households in the village. Additional 32 are vacated for various reasons.

The first information regarding people living in the village was recorded in 1717. when there was one house paying taxes. Less than 20 years after population dramatically increased, thanks to Austrian government (1718-1739) during which there were no persecutions instigated by Muslim Ottomans against Christian Serb people. Yet, in 1739. Austria surrendered the area back to the Ottomans, according to the Treaty of Belgrade, hence the population stagnation for the next one hundred years.

Markova Crkva saw a steady demographic increase after the liberation (1804-1815) all the way to the World War I when it lost considerable number of people, mostly adult, fighting men. The final boom started in the Interbellum, and was briefly stopped because of the World War II, but recuperated again. The final drop in numbers was first recorded 1961. since millions of people from countryside migrated to cities during Yugoslav era.

Further population loss is a consequence of low birth rates, a pest typical for whole of the Eastern Europe.

Population changes in the 20th century

YEAR	1717	1735	1818	1834	1866	1874	1884	1890	1895	1900	1910+	1916!	1948	1953	1961	1971	1981	1991	2002	2011
HOUSEHOLDS	1	12	12	11	12	13	15	18	19	21	76	29	50	56	58	54	52	45	39	39
PEOPLE	?	?	?	78	94	92	127	166	169	180	545	149	244	252	211	165	162	129	110	111
"?" stands for no data because Ottoman authorities were not interested in determining the total number of people residing within the Empire. The primary concern of Ottoman government were taxpaying households (those ran by adult men since widows and juveniles were not accounted for tax). Serbian autonomous government (after 1815) followed that fashion until 1834. when the first Census resembling those from the Western Europe took place.
+ Regarding census in 1910 - It is rather unclear how could such a small village be even able to accommodate almost 550 people, in terms of space. Also, the possibility of such a dramatic increase looks unbelievable, but that is what the Census Book for 1910. say.
The Census in 1916. was enforced by occupational Austrian administration following the exile of Serbian Army and Government during the World War I.
