= Donji Lajkovac =

Coordinates: 44°18′N 20°12′E

- Village (Selo)
- Interactive map of Donji Lajkovac
- Country: Serbia
- District: Kolubara
- Municipality: Lajkovac
- Time zone: UTC+1 (CET)
  - Summer (DST): UTC+2 (CEST)

Donji Lajkovac is a village situated in Lajkovac municipality in Serbia.
