= Pridvorica (Lajkovac) =

Village in Serbia

Coordinates: 44°19′39″N 20°08′33″E

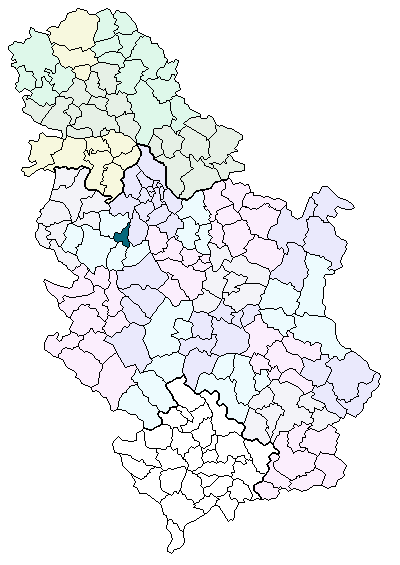
Location of the municipality of Lajkovac in Serbia

Pridvorica (in Serbian Cyrillic Придворица) is a village in Serbia located in the municipality of Lajkovac, and the district of Kolubara. In 2002, it had 227 inhabitants, of which 226 were Serbs (99.55%).

In 1948, the village had 443 inhabitants, in 1981 it had fallen to 313, and in 1991 the population fell again to 277.
