= Strmovo (Lajkovac) =

Coordinates: 44°19′N 20°6′E

Strmovo Стрмово
- Village (Selo)
- Interactive map of Strmovo
- Country: Serbia
- District: Kolubara District
- Municipality: Lajkovac
- Time zone: UTC+1 (CET)
  - Summer (DST): UTC+2 (CEST)

Strmovo is a village situated in Lajkovac municipality in Serbia.
