= Nepričava =

Coordinates: 44°21′N 20°6′E

- Village (Selo)
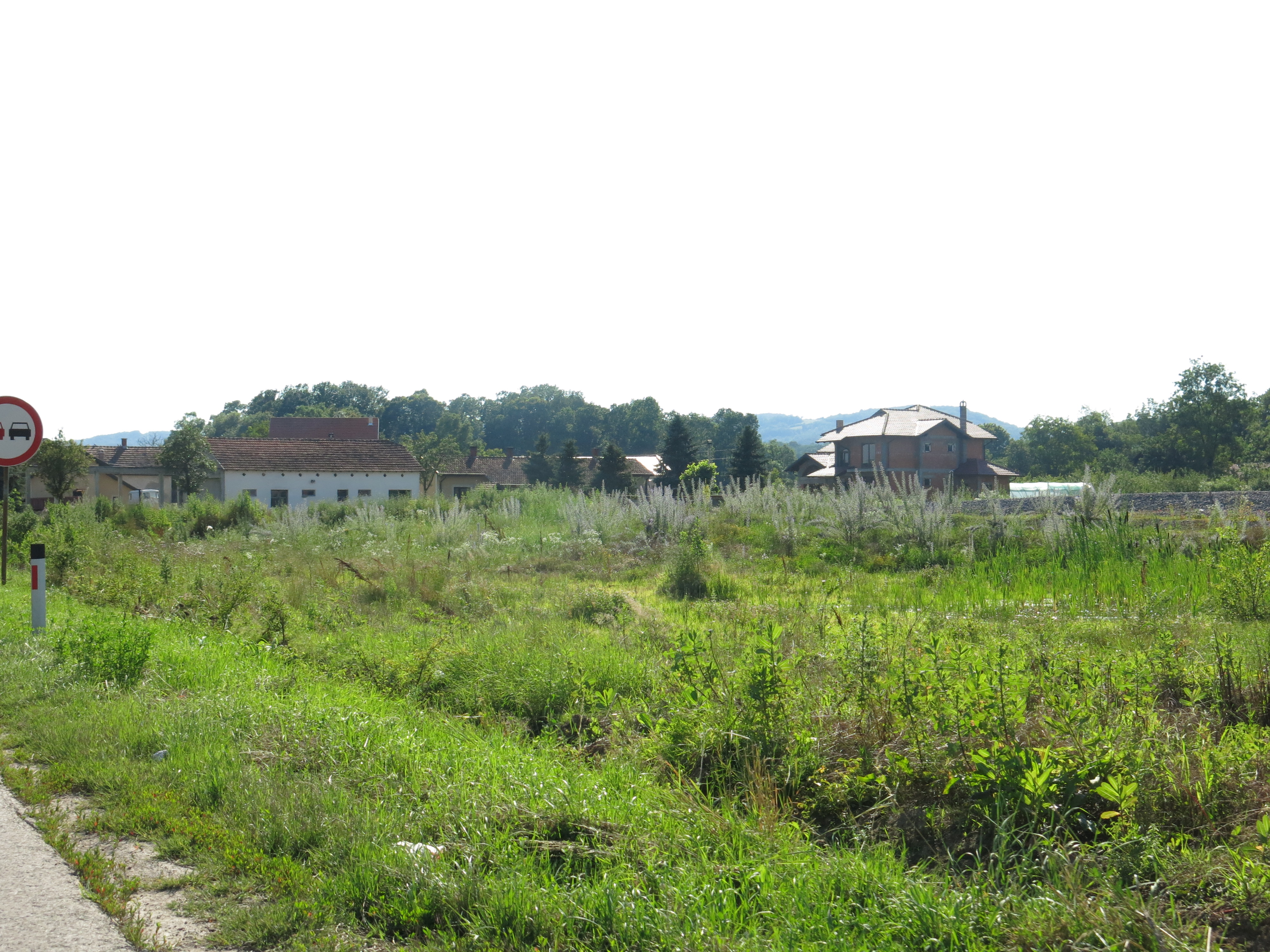
- View of Nepričava
- Interactive map of Nepričava
- Country: Serbia
- District: Kolubara District
- Municipality: Lajkovac
- Time zone: UTC+1 (CET)
  - Summer (DST): UTC+2 (CEST)

Nepričava is a village situated in Lajkovac municipality in Serbia.
