= Bajevac =

Coordinates: 44°22′N 20°3′E

- Village (Selo)
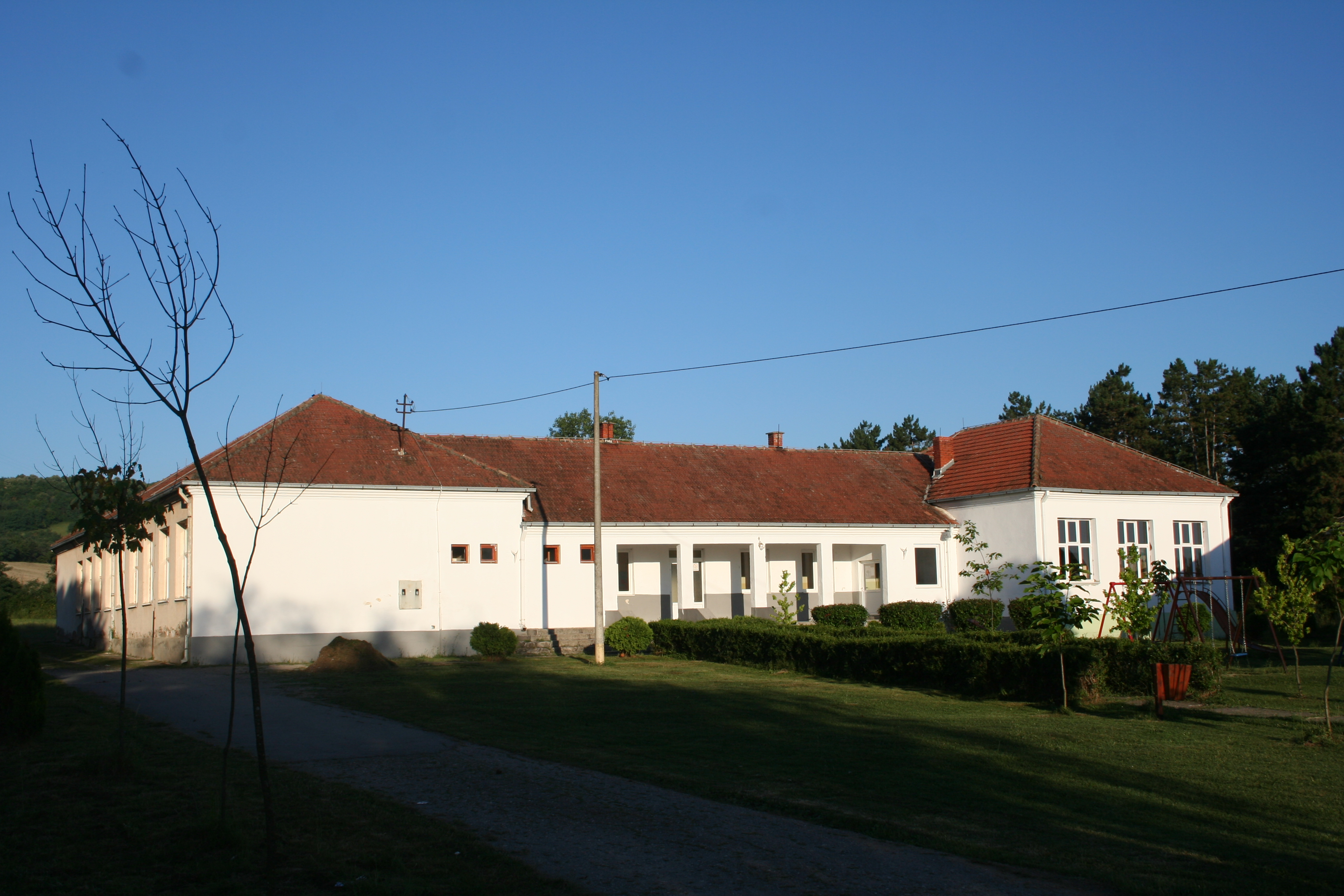
- Bajevac, School and monument
- Interactive map of Bajevac
- Country: Serbia
- Municipality: Lajkovac
- Time zone: UTC+1 (CET)
  - Summer (DST): UTC+2 (CEST)

Bajevac is a village situated in Lajkovac municipality, Kolubara District in Serbia.
