= Mali Borak =

Coordinates: 44°28′N 20°13′E

- Village (Selo)
- Interactive map of Mali Borak
- Country: Serbia
- District: Kolubara District
- Municipality: Lajkovac

Area
  - Total: 10.39 km^{2} (4.01 sq mi)

Population (2022 census)
  - Total: 0
  - Density: 0/km^{2} (0/sq mi)
- Time zone: UTC+1 (CET)
  - Summer (DST): UTC+2 (CEST)

Mali Borak is a village situated in Lajkovac municipality in Serbia. As of the 2022 census, no one resided in the village.
