= Stepanje =

Coordinates: 44°21′N 20°3′E

- Village (Selo)
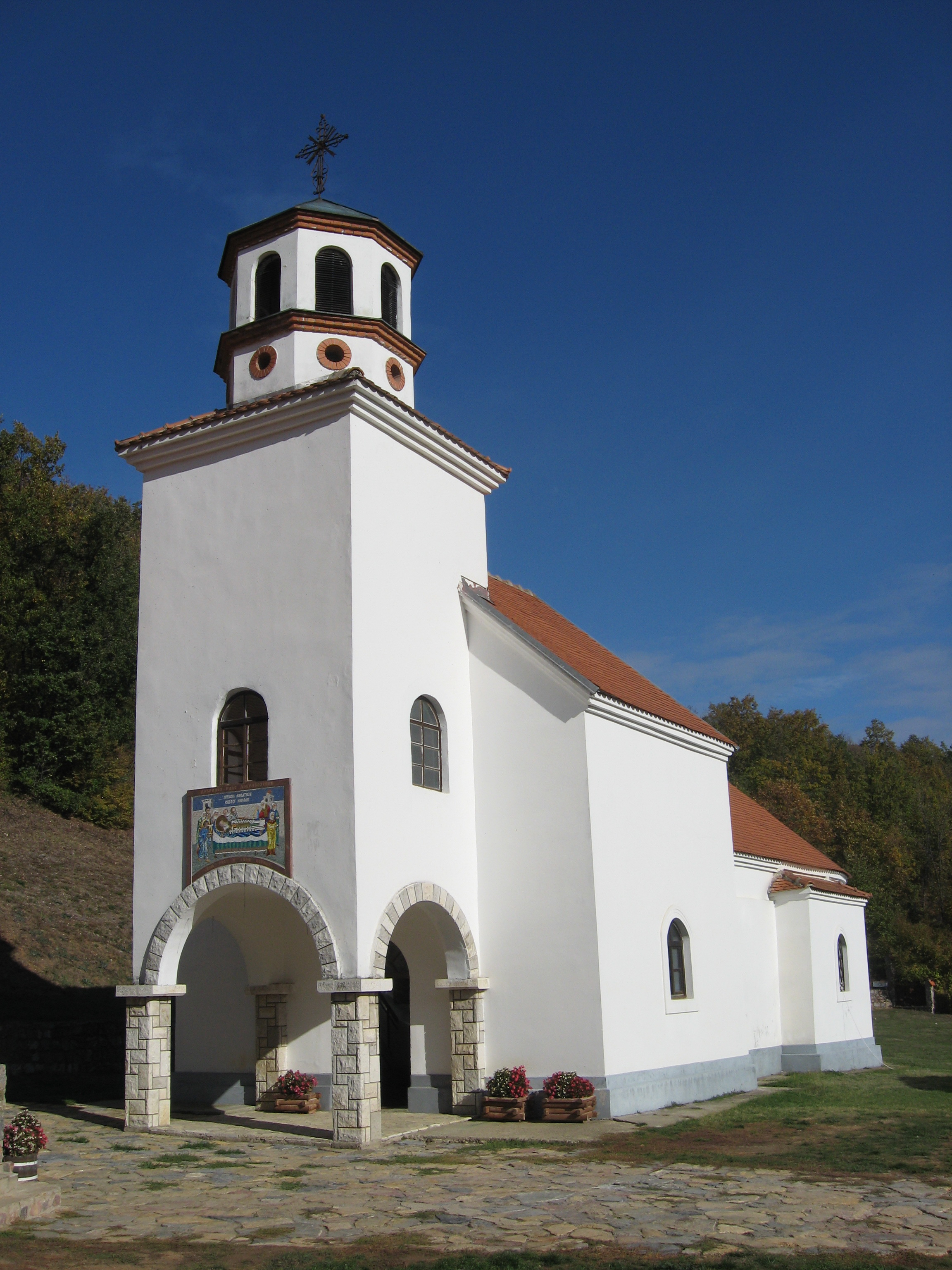
- Stepanje - The Church St Nikola
- Motto: Ǎ
- Interactive map of Stepanje
- Country: Serbia
- District: Kolubara District
- Municipality: Lajkovac
- Time zone: UTC+1 (CET)
  - Summer (DST): UTC+2 (CEST)

Stepanje is a village situated in Lajkovac municipality in Serbia.
