= Lajkovac (selo) =

Coordinates: 44.374965°N 20.170916°E

Lajkovac (selo) Лајковац (село)
- Village (Selo)
- Interactive map of Lajkovac (selo)
- Country: Serbia
- District: Kolubara District
- Municipality: Lajkovac
- Time zone: UTC+1 (CET)
  - Summer (DST): UTC+2 (CEST)

Lajkovac (selo) (Serbian Cyrillic: Лајковац (село)) is a village situated in Lajkovac municipality in Serbia.
