= Rubribreza =

- Village (Selo)
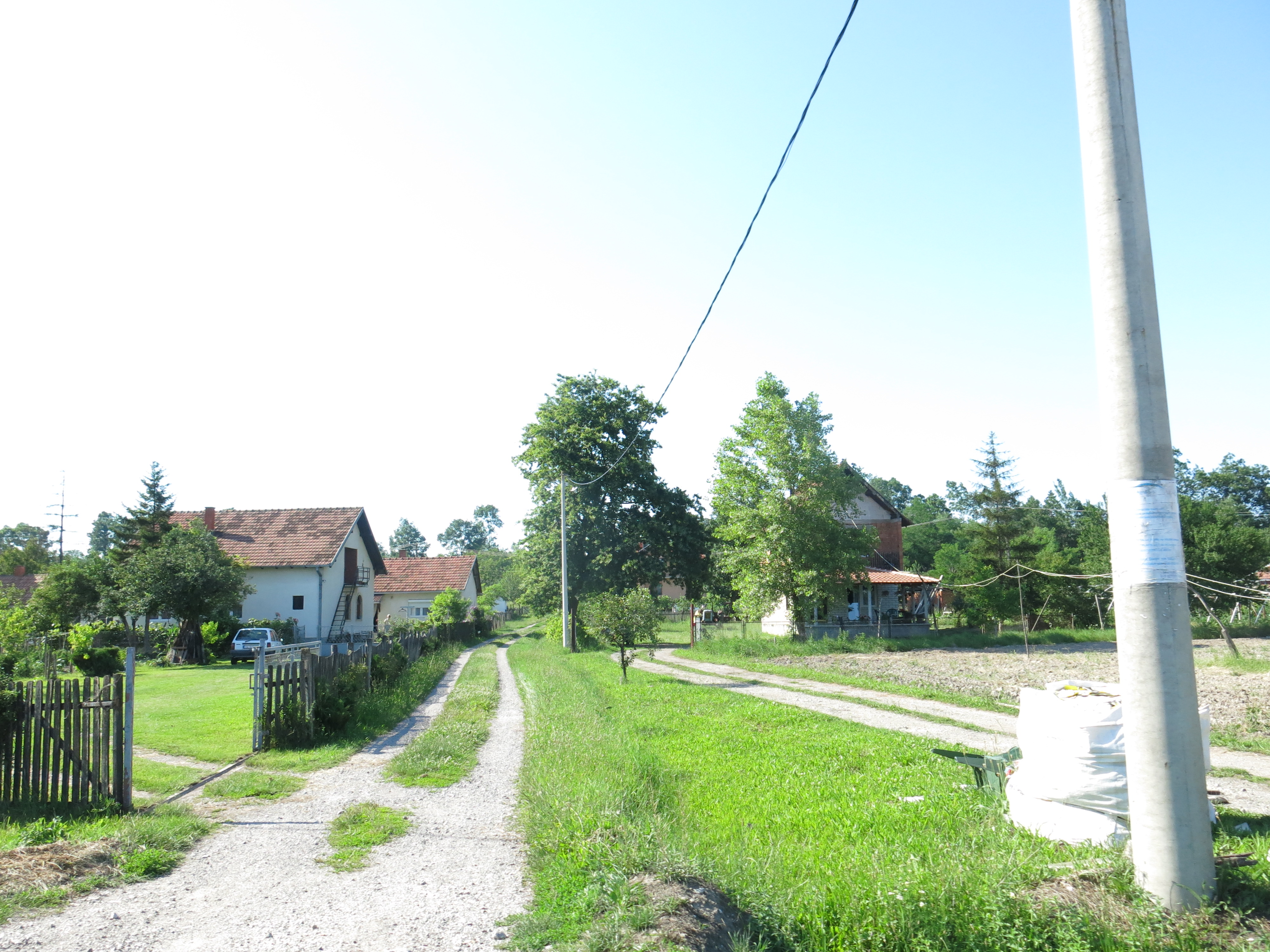
- Street of Rubribreza

- Location within Serbia
- Coordinates: 44°21′N 20°7′E
- Country: Serbia
- District: Kolubara District
- Municipality: Lajkovac
- Time zone: UTC+1 (CET)
  - Summer (DST): UTC+2 (CEST)

Rubribreza is a village situated in Lajkovac municipality in Serbia. Most people are in a dilemma about the name, and it is Rubribreza and NOT Rubibreza.
