= Vračević =

Coordinates: 44°17′N 20°10′E

- Village (Selo)
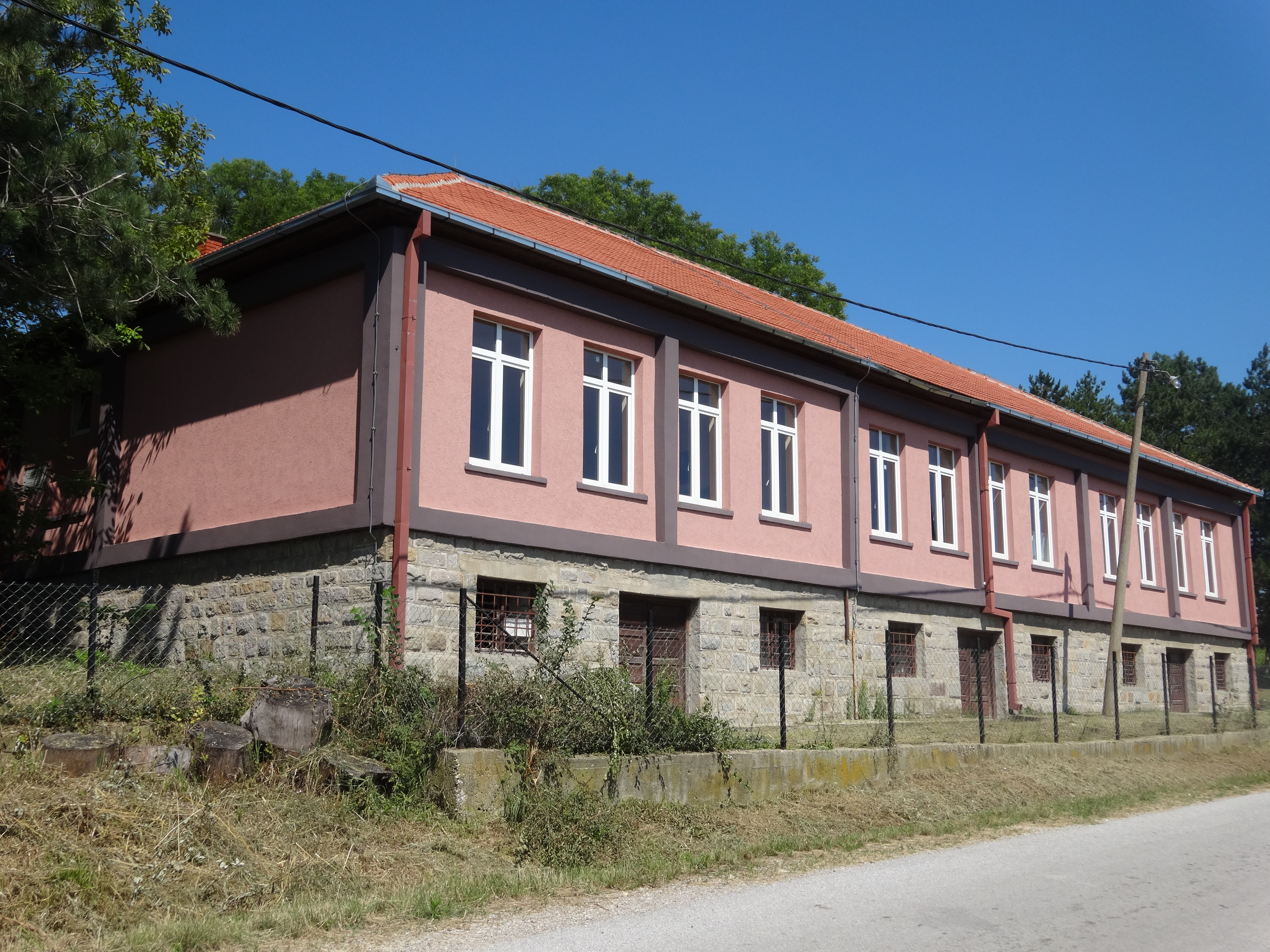
- Elementary School in Vračević
- Interactive map of Vračević
- Country: Serbia
- District: Kolubara District
- Municipality: Lajkovac
- Time zone: UTC+1 (CET)
  - Summer (DST): UTC+2 (CEST)

Vračević is a village situated in Lajkovac municipality in Serbia.
