= Skobalj (Lajkovac) =

Coordinates: 44°26′N 20°14′E

Skobalj Скобаљ
- Village (Selo)
- Interactive map of Skobalj
- Country: Serbia
- District: Kolubara District
- Municipality: Lajkovac
- Time zone: UTC+1 (CET)
  - Summer (DST): UTC+2 (CEST)

Skobalj is a village situated in Lajkovac municipality in Serbia.
