= Jabučje =

Jabučje Јабучје (Serbian)
- Village (Selo)
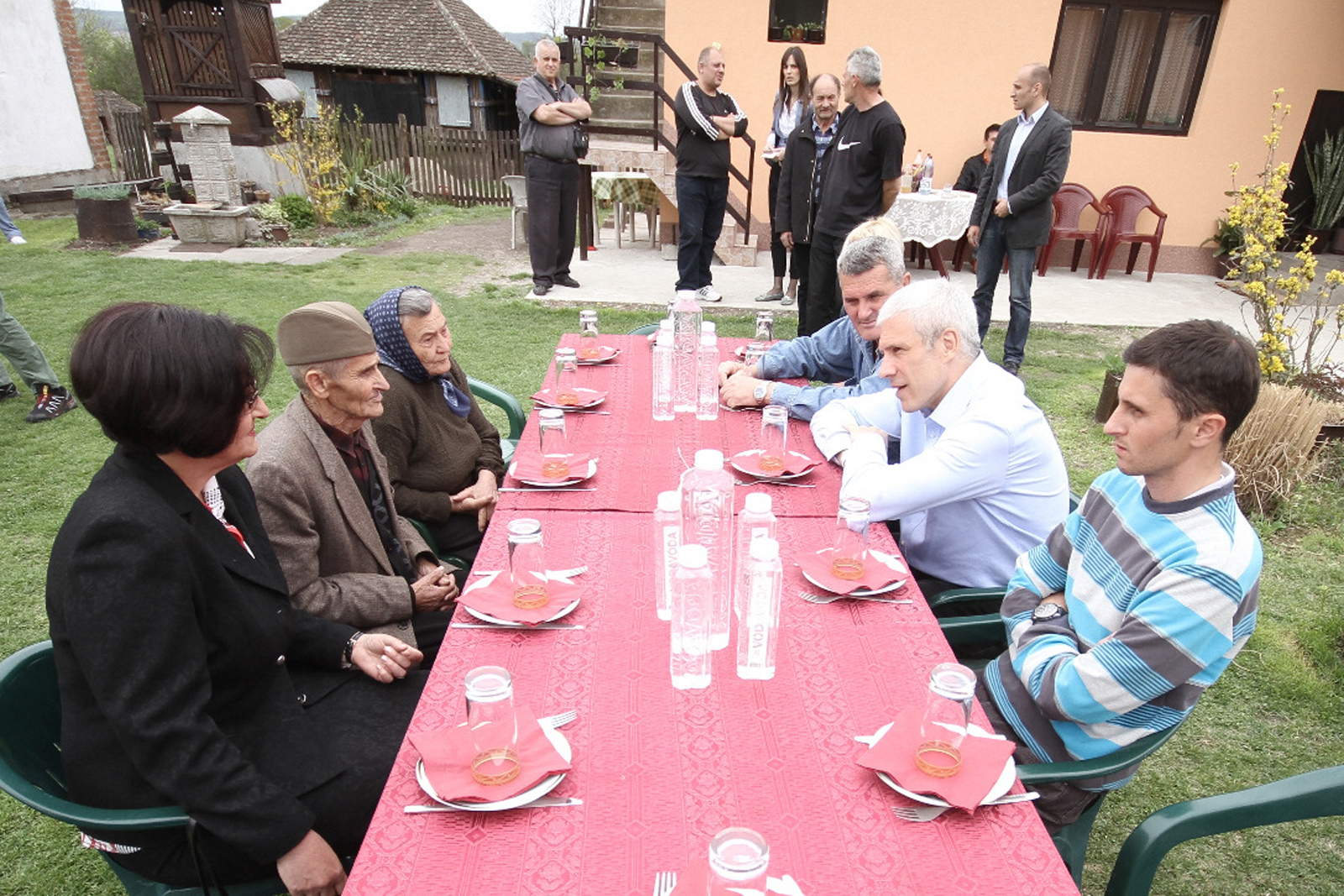
- Boris Tadić guesting the Grčić family in Jabučje, 2012

- Location in Serbia
- Coordinates: 44°23′59″N 20°11′56″E
- Country: Serbia
- Region: Šumadija
- District: Kolubara District
- City district: Lajkovac
- Municipality: Valjevo

Population
  - Total: 2,000

Jabučje (Serbian: Јабучје) is a village in Valjevo municipality Lajkovac city district in the Šumadija District of central Serbia.

It has a population of 2000.
