= Pepeljevac (Lajkovac) =

Pepeljevac Пепељевац
- Village (Selo)
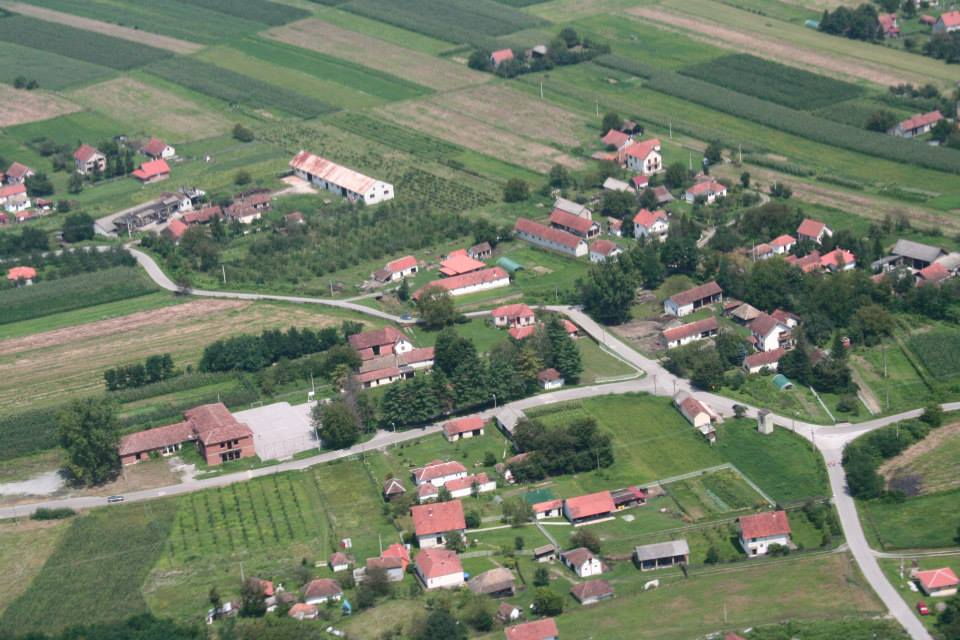
- Aerial view on Pepeljevac

- Location within Serbia
- Coordinates: 44°20′N 20°9′E
- Country: Serbia
- District: Kolubara District
- Municipality: Lajkovac

Area
  - Total: 11.66 km^{2} (4.50 sq mi)
- Elevation: 179 m (587 ft)

Population (2011)
  - Total: 666
  - Density: 57.1/km^{2} (148/sq mi)
- Time zone: UTC+1 (CET)
  - Summer (DST): UTC+2 (CEST)

Pepeljevac (Serbian Cyrillic: Пепељевац) is a village located in the municipality of Lajkovac, Serbia. As of 2011 census, it has a population of 666 inhabitants.
