= Slovac =

- Village (Selo)
- Location within Serbia
- Coordinates: 44°20′34″N 20°05′11″E
- Country: Serbia
- District: Kolubara District
- Municipality: Lajkovac
- Elevation: 151 m (495 ft)

Population (2011)
  - Total: 270
- Time zone: UTC+1 (CET)
  - Summer (DST): UTC+2 (CEST)
- Postal code: 14223

Slovac is a village situated in Lajkovac municipality in Serbia.

According to the 2002 census, it had 307 inhabitants (compared to 314 in 1991).

== Gallery ==
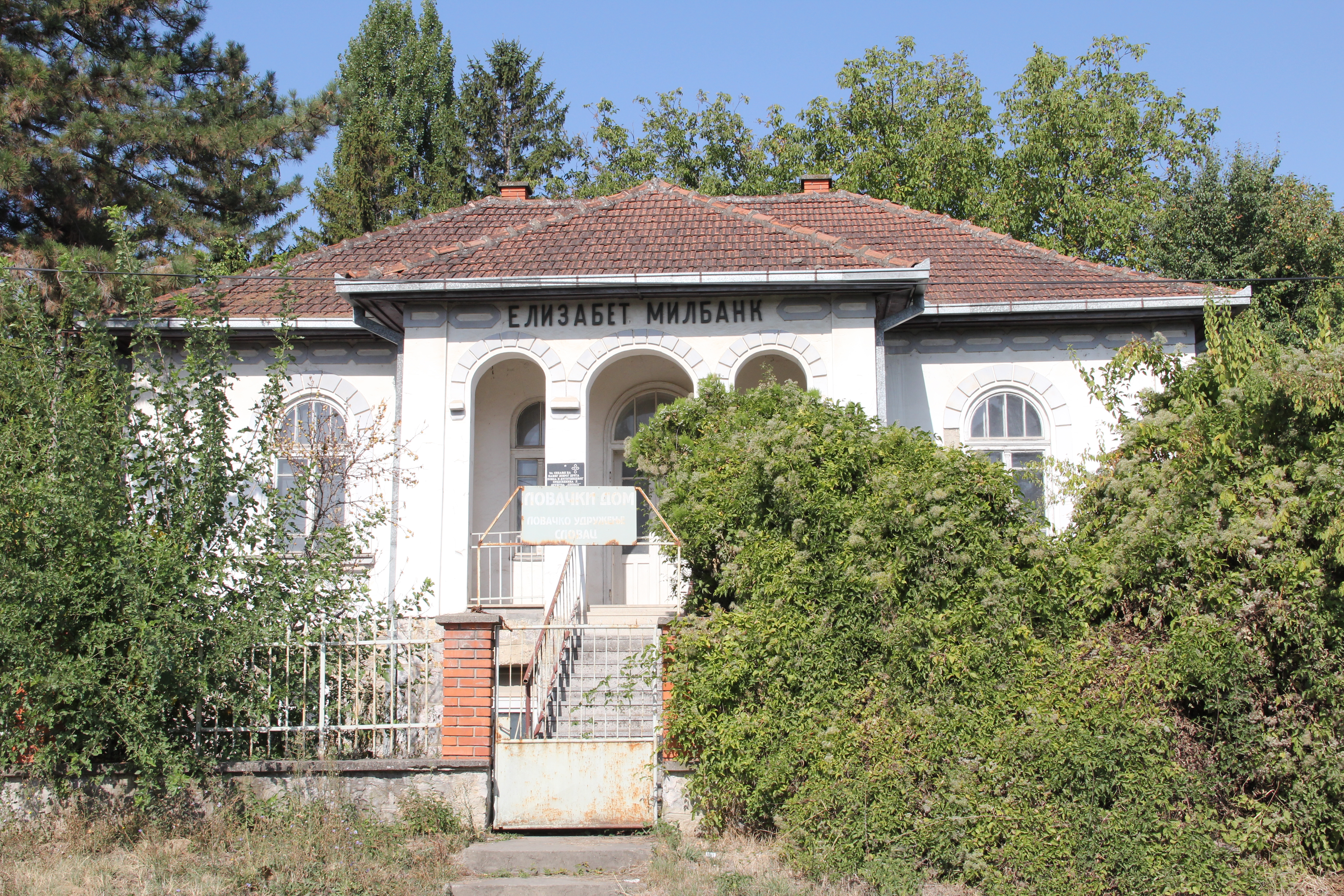
Slovac - house of Elizabet Mulbank

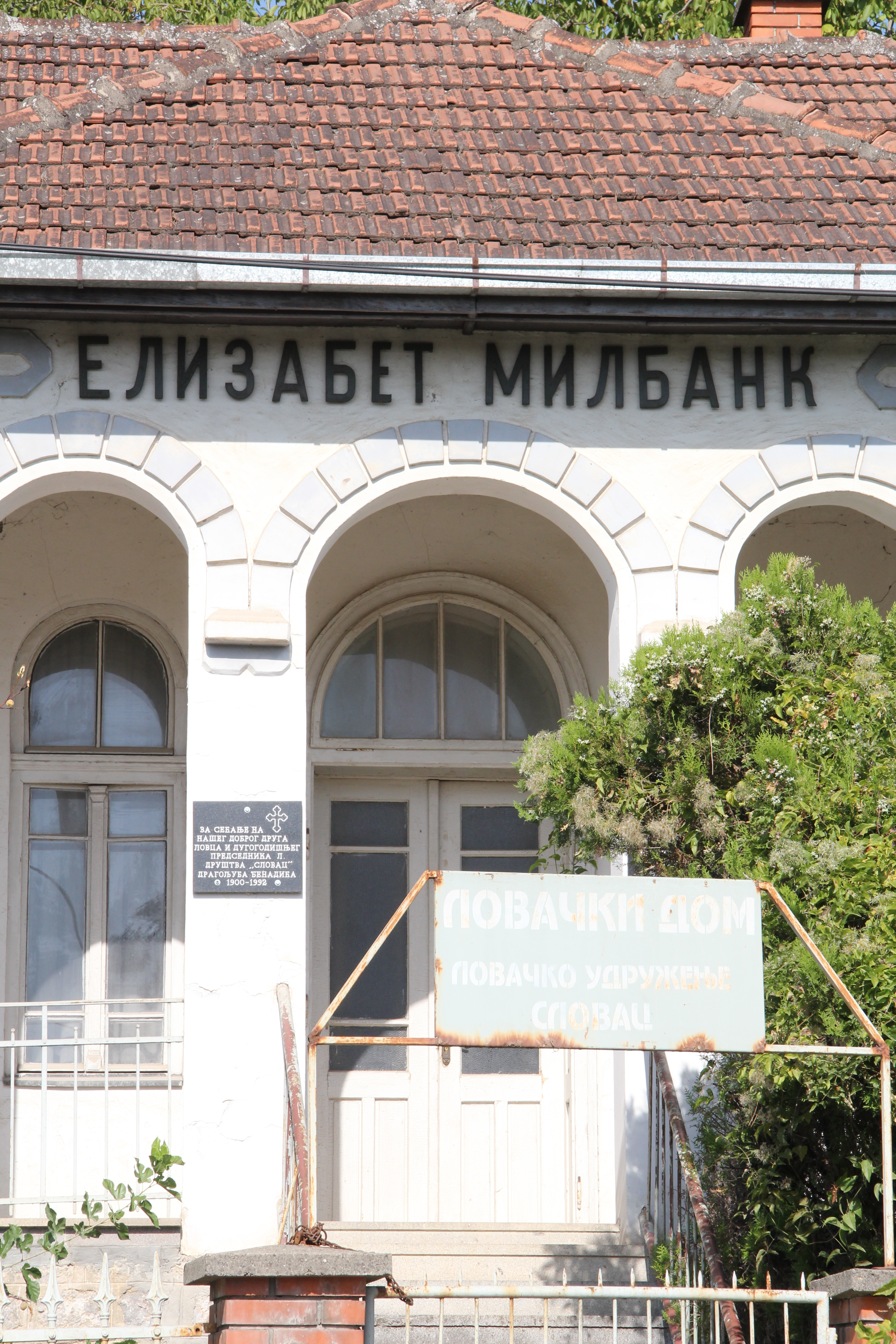
Slovac - house of Elizabet Mulbank

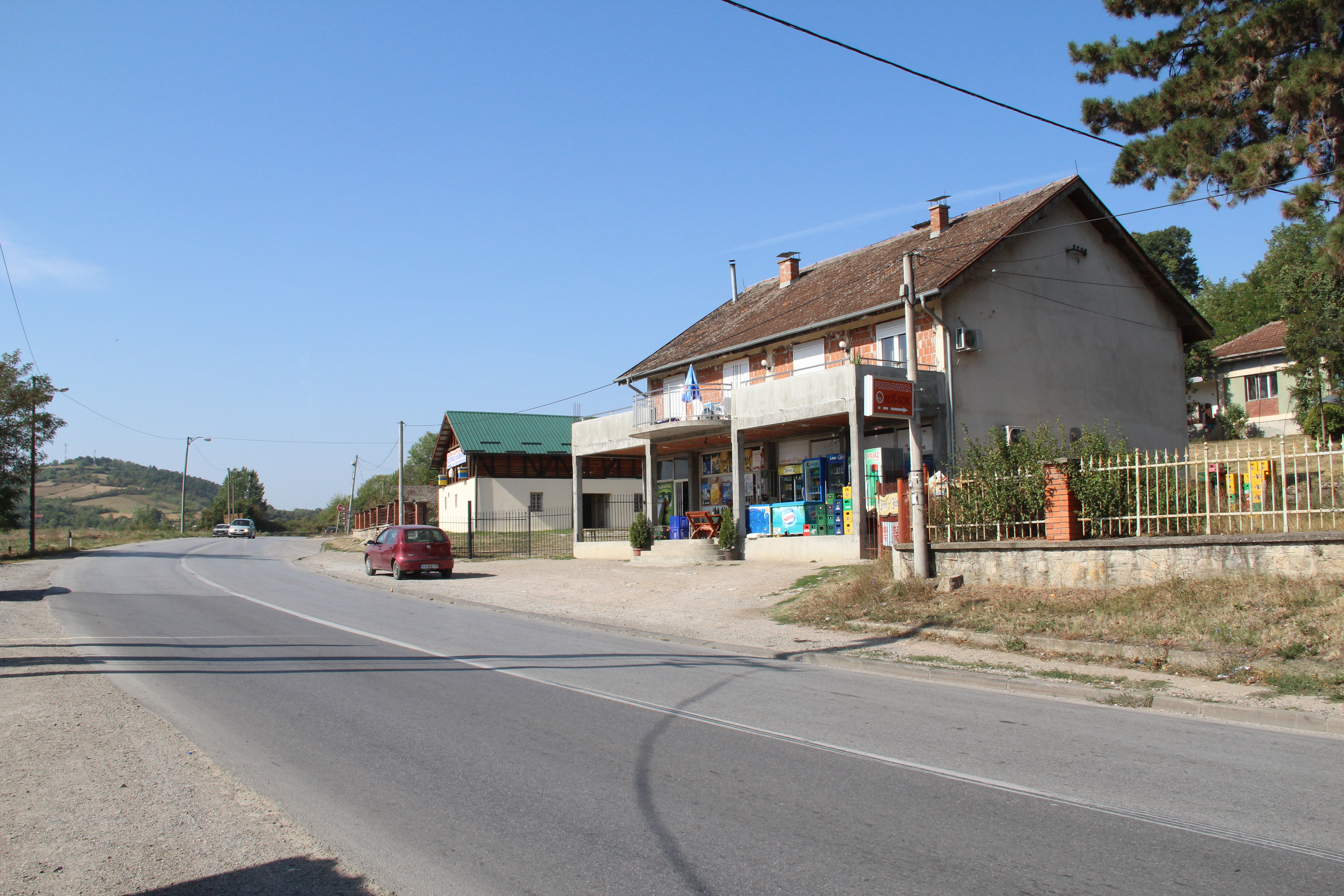
Slovac - Panorama

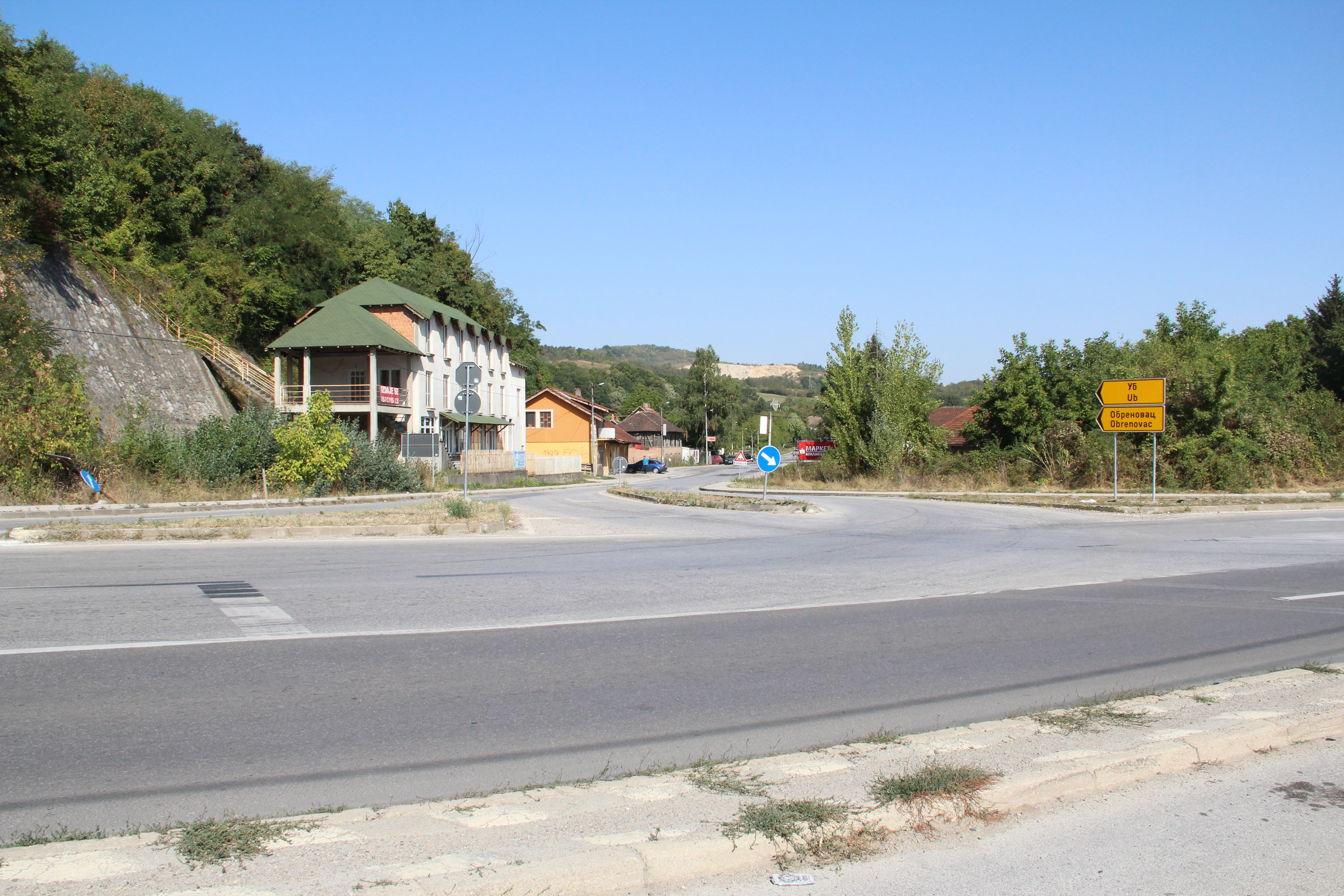
Slovac - crossroad

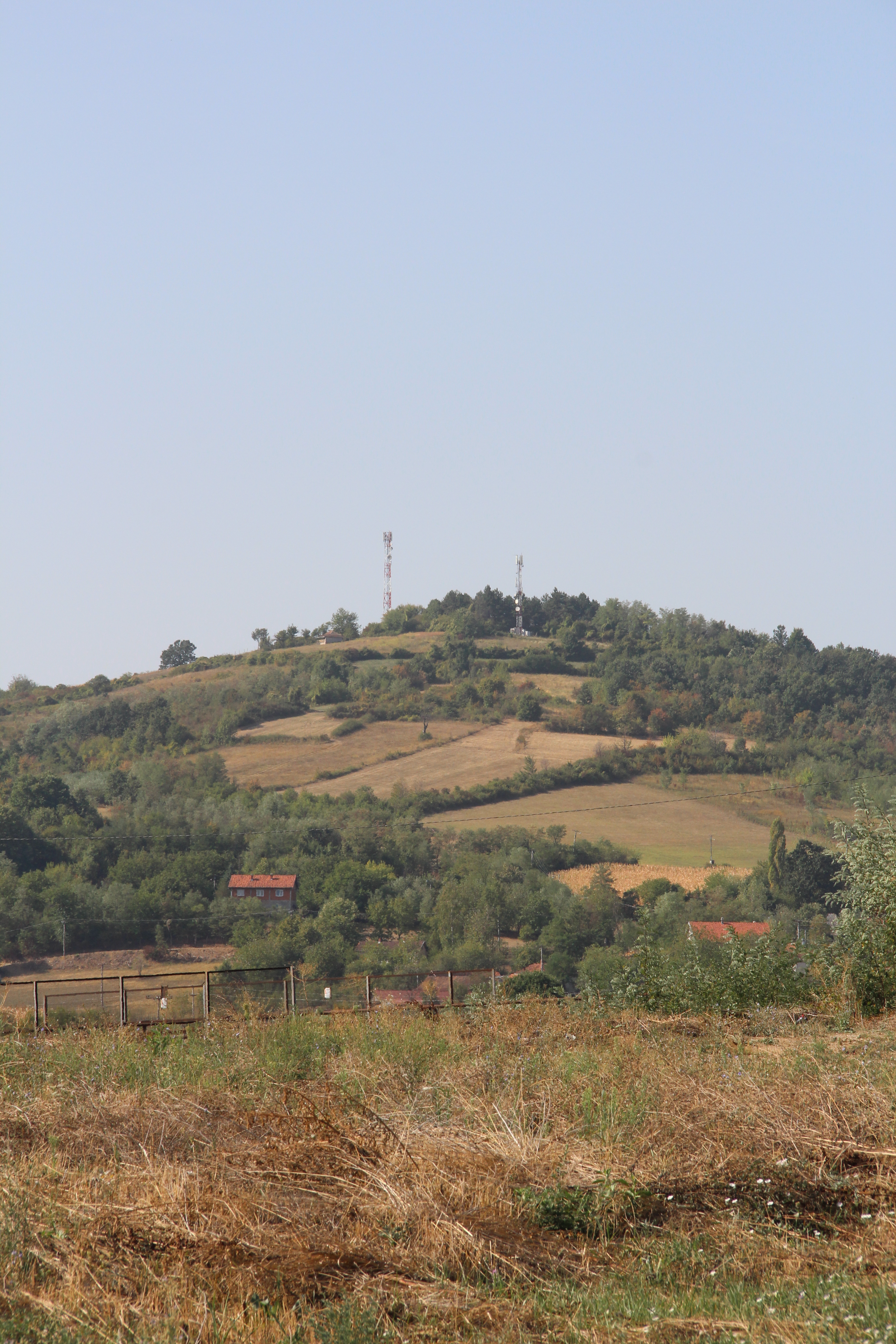
Slovac - Panorama

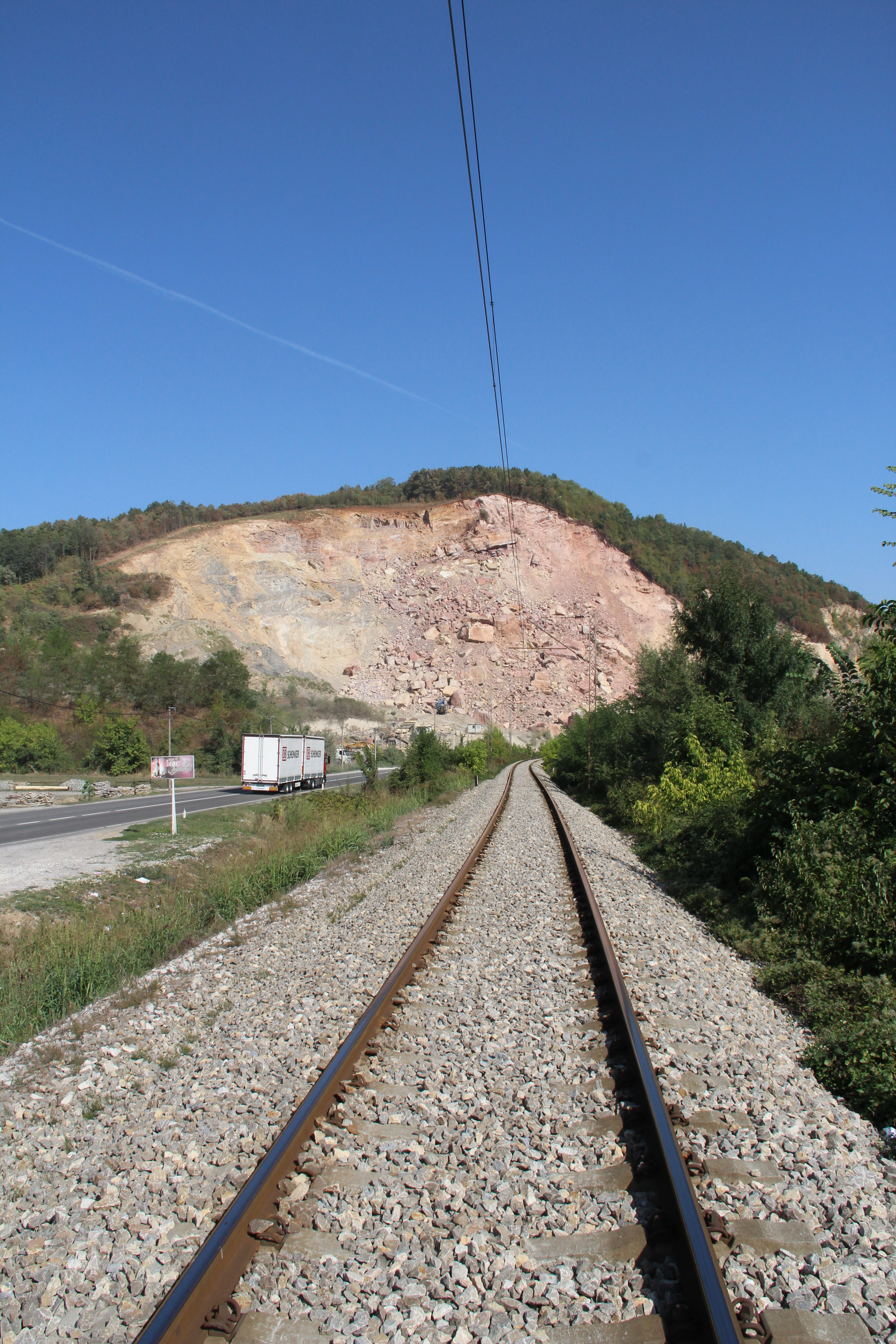
Slovac - quarry and rail Belgrade - Bar

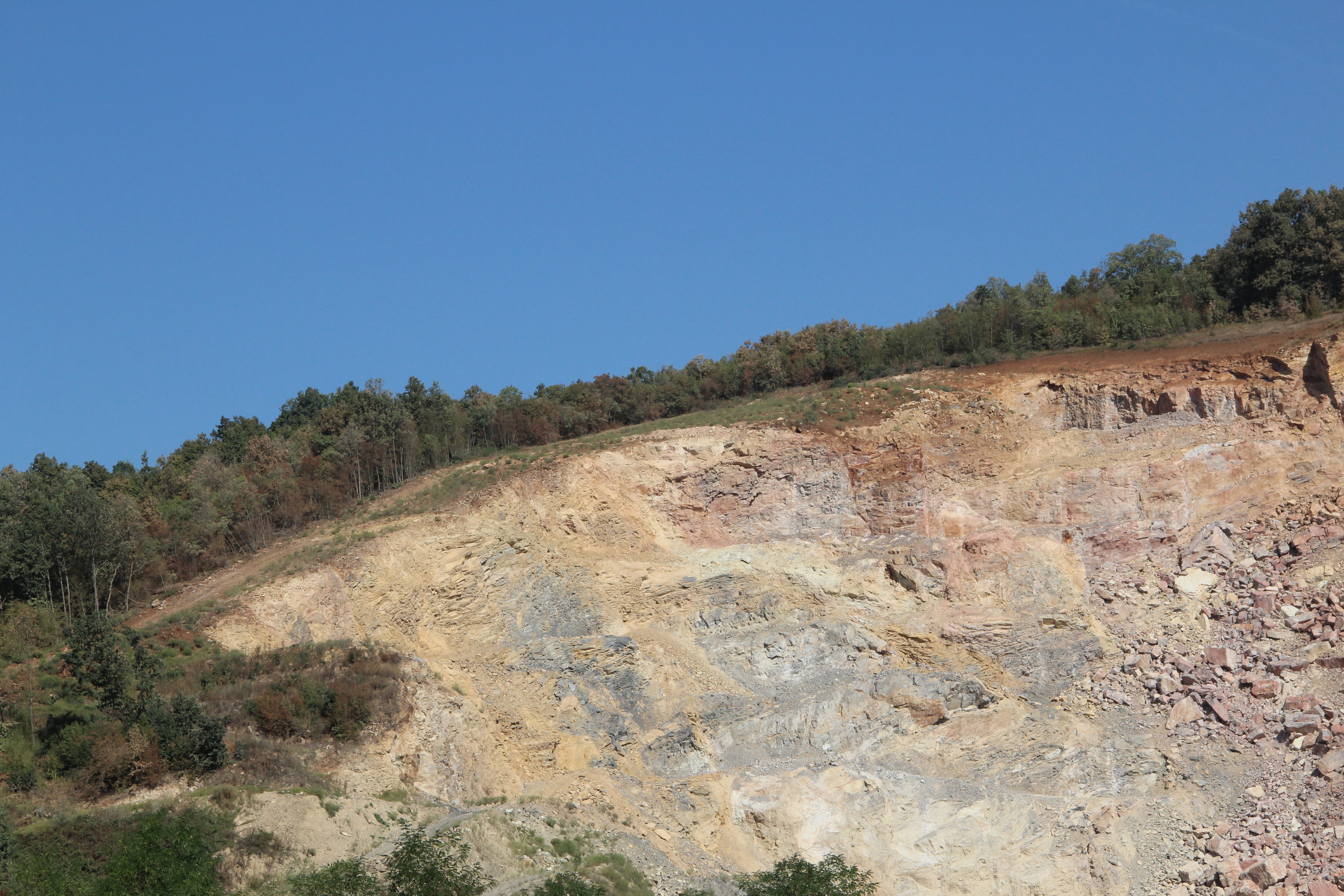
Slovac - archaeology site Jerinin grad
