= Ćelije (Lajkovac) =

Coordinates: 44°21′N 20°11′E

Ćelije Ћелије
- Village (Selo)
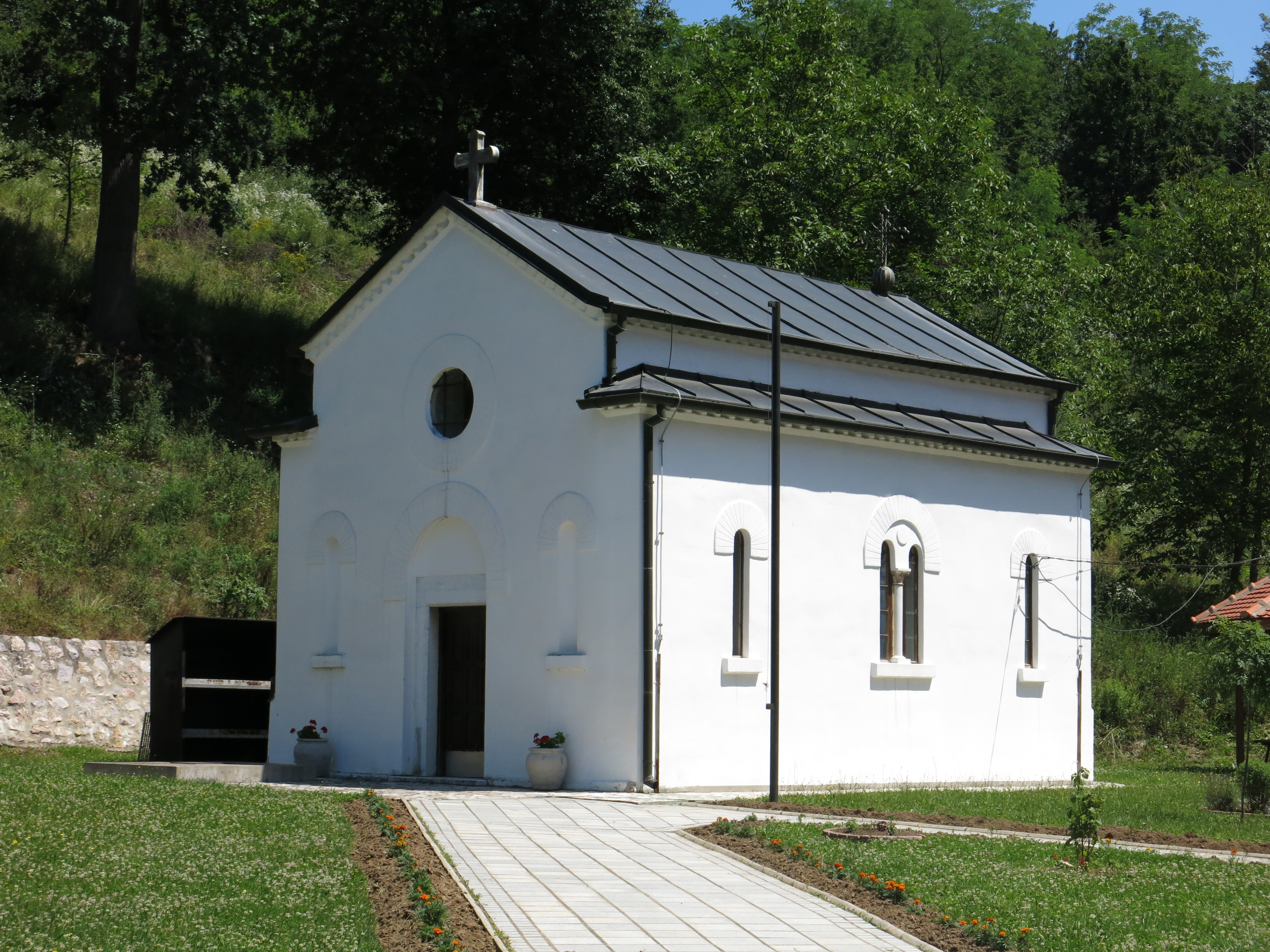
- Ćelije, Church of Saint George
- Interactive map of Ćelije
- Country: Serbia
- District: Kolubara
- Municipality: Lajkovac
- Time zone: UTC+1 (CET)
  - Summer (DST): UTC+2 (CEST)

Ćelije is a village situated in Lajkovac municipality, Kolubara District in Serbia.
