= Popučke =

- Village (Selo)
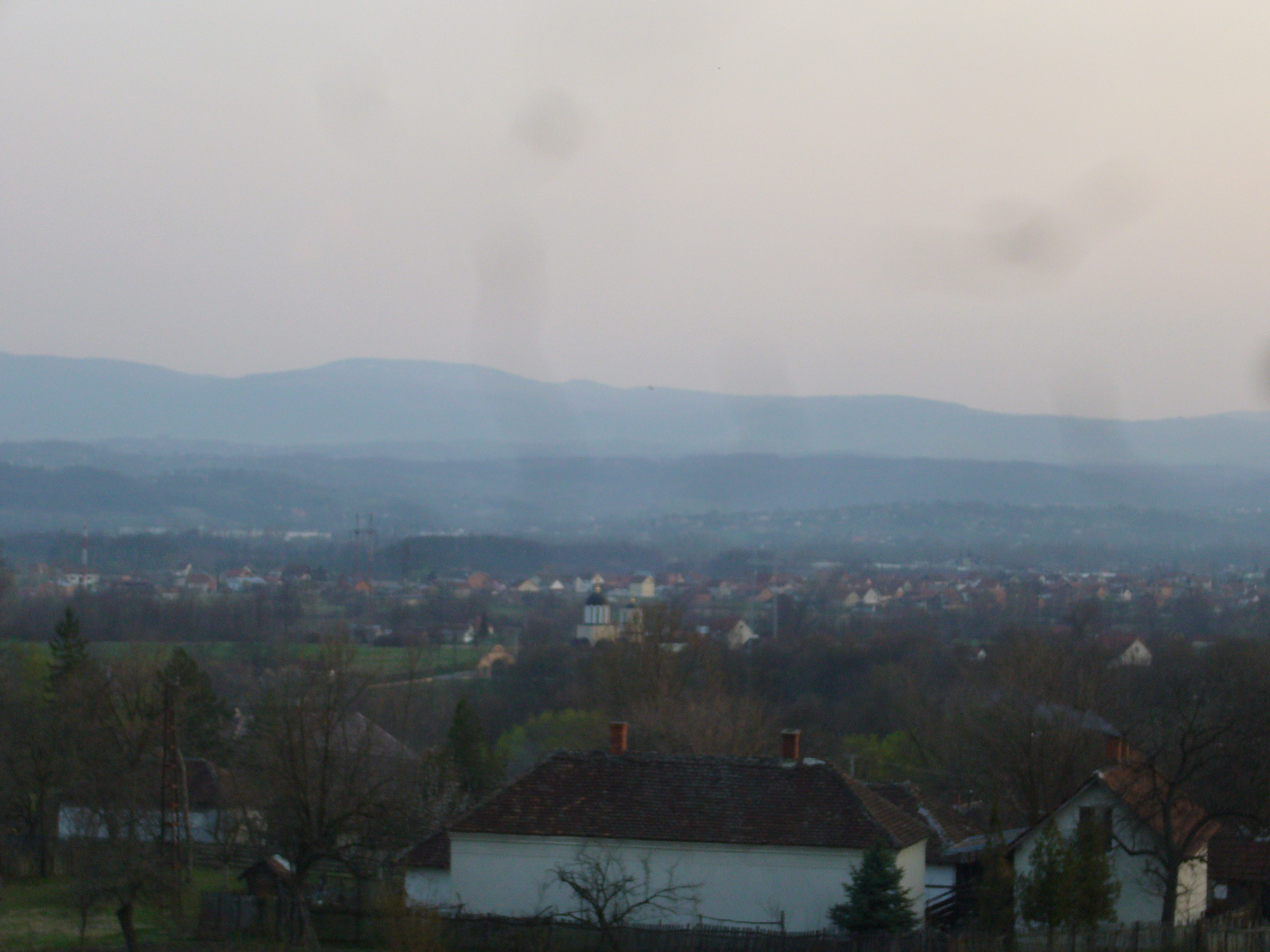

- Location within Serbia
- Coordinates: 44°17′N 19°56′E
- Country: Serbia
- District: Kolubara District
- Municipality: Valjevo

Population (2002)
  - Total: 2,607
- Time zone: UTC+1 (CET)
  - Summer (DST): UTC+2 (CEST)

Popučke is a village in the municipality of Valjevo, Serbia. According to the 2002 census, the village has a population of 2607 people.

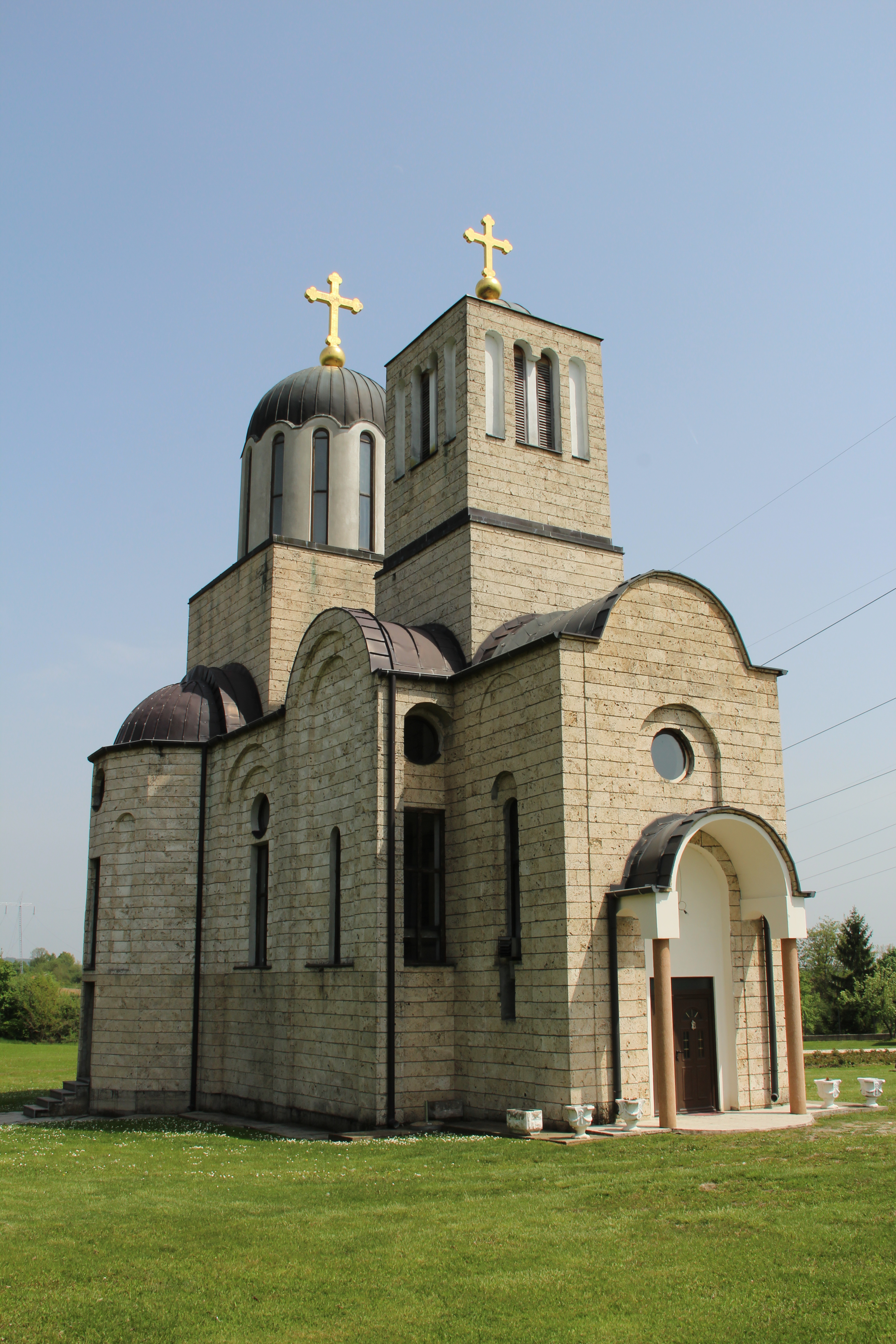
Popučke village - church

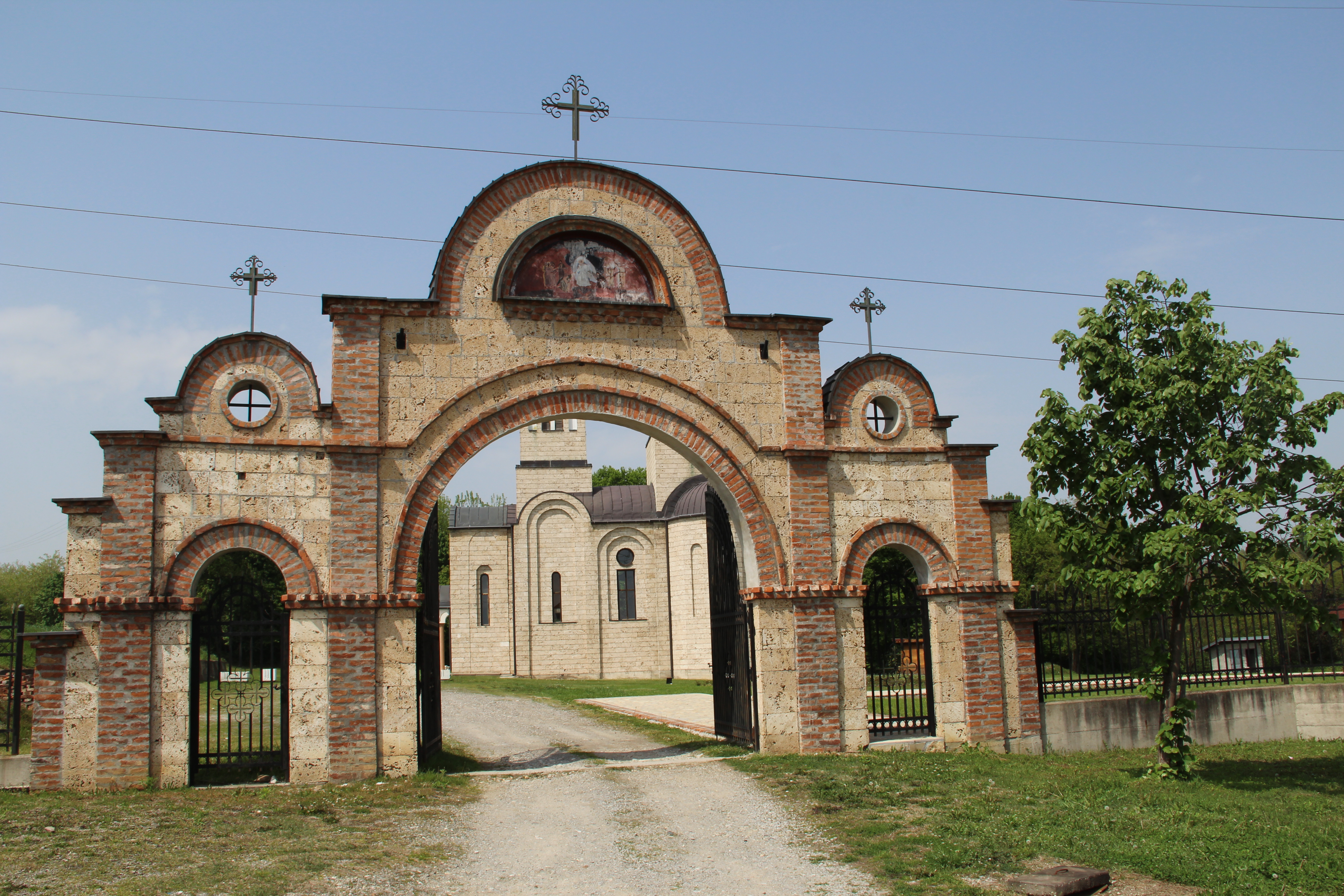
Popučke village - church (entrance)

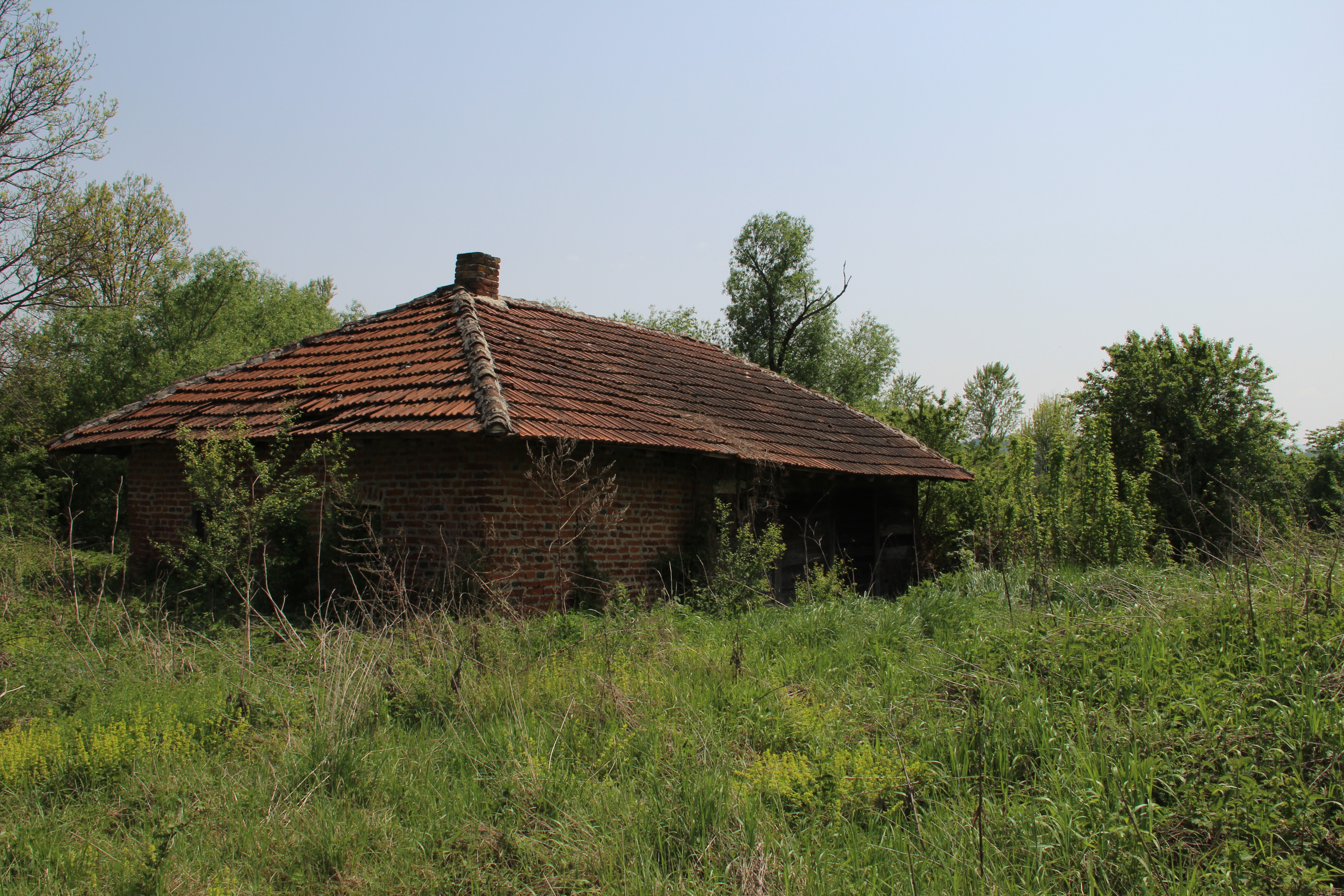
Popučke village - mill

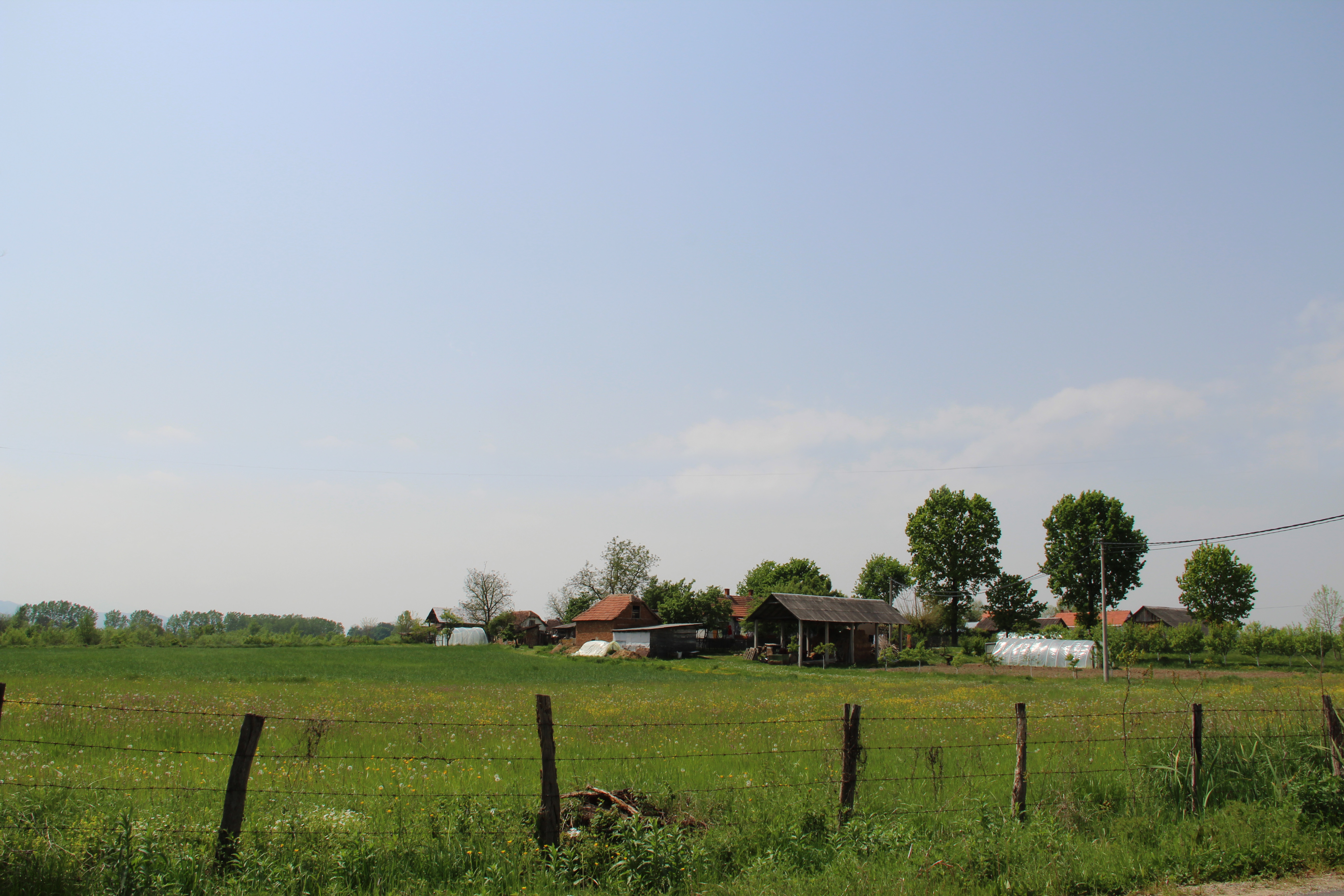
Popučke village - panorama

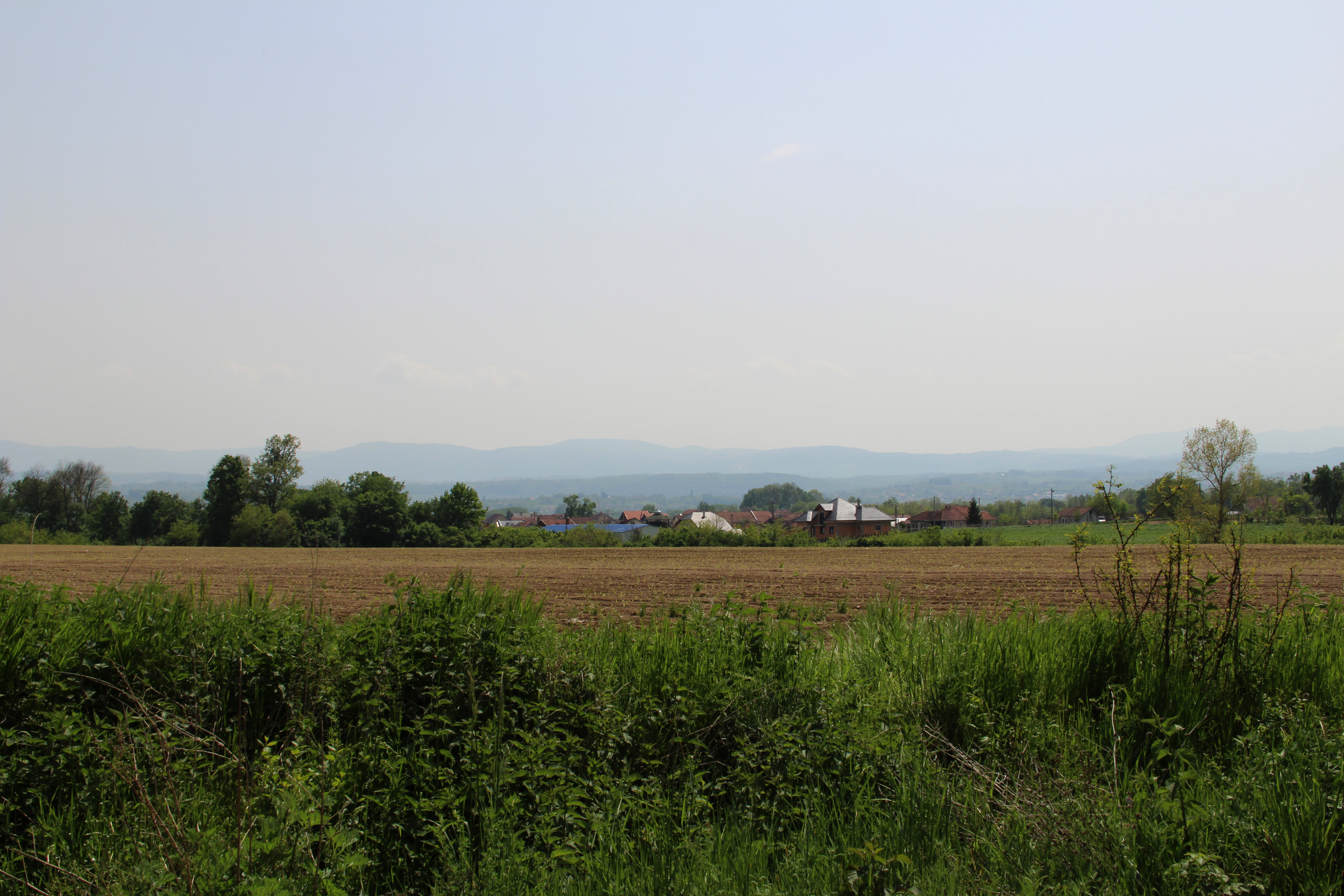
Popučke village - panorama

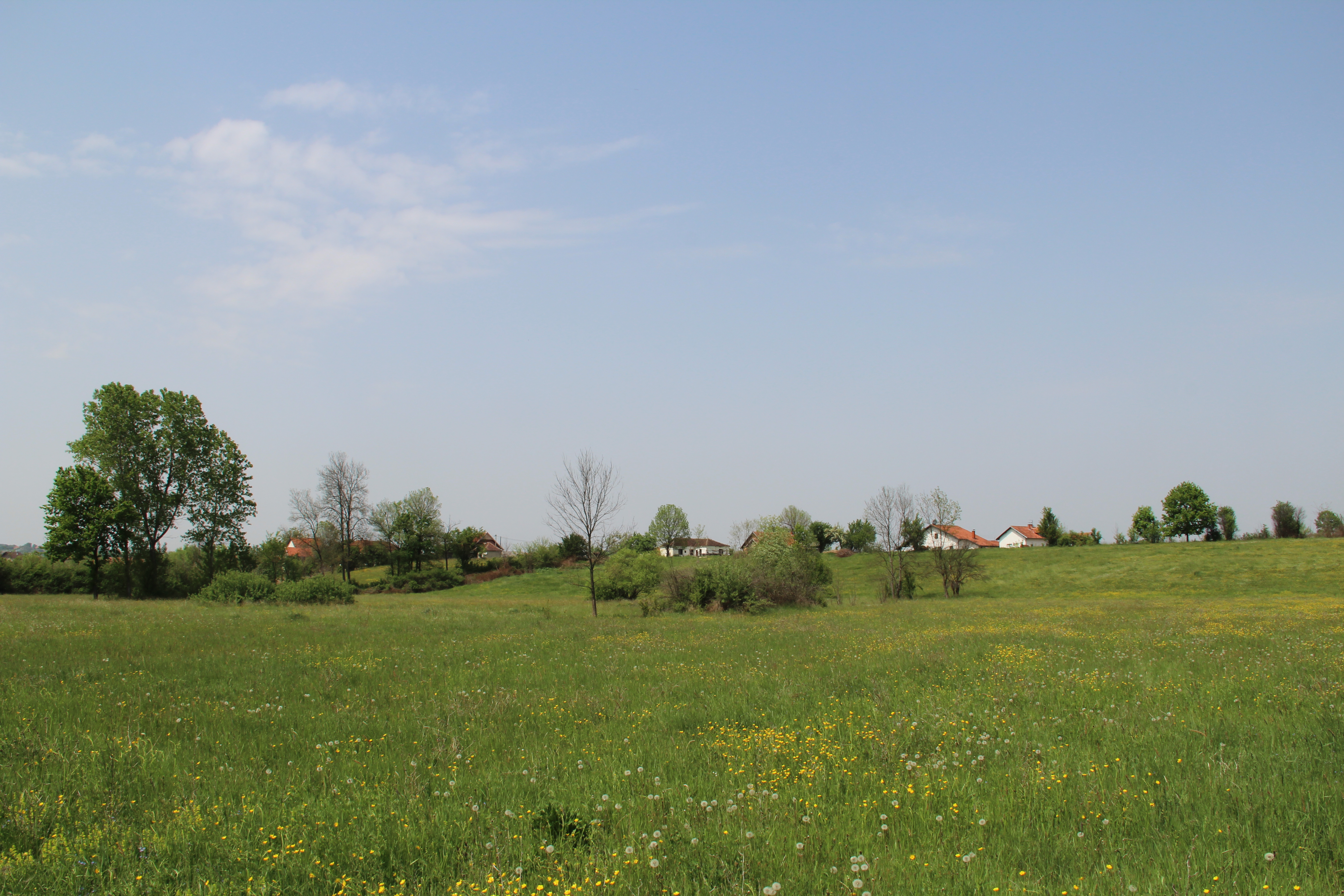
Popučke village - panorama
