= Ratkovac, Lajkovac =

Ratkovac Ратковац
- Village (Selo)
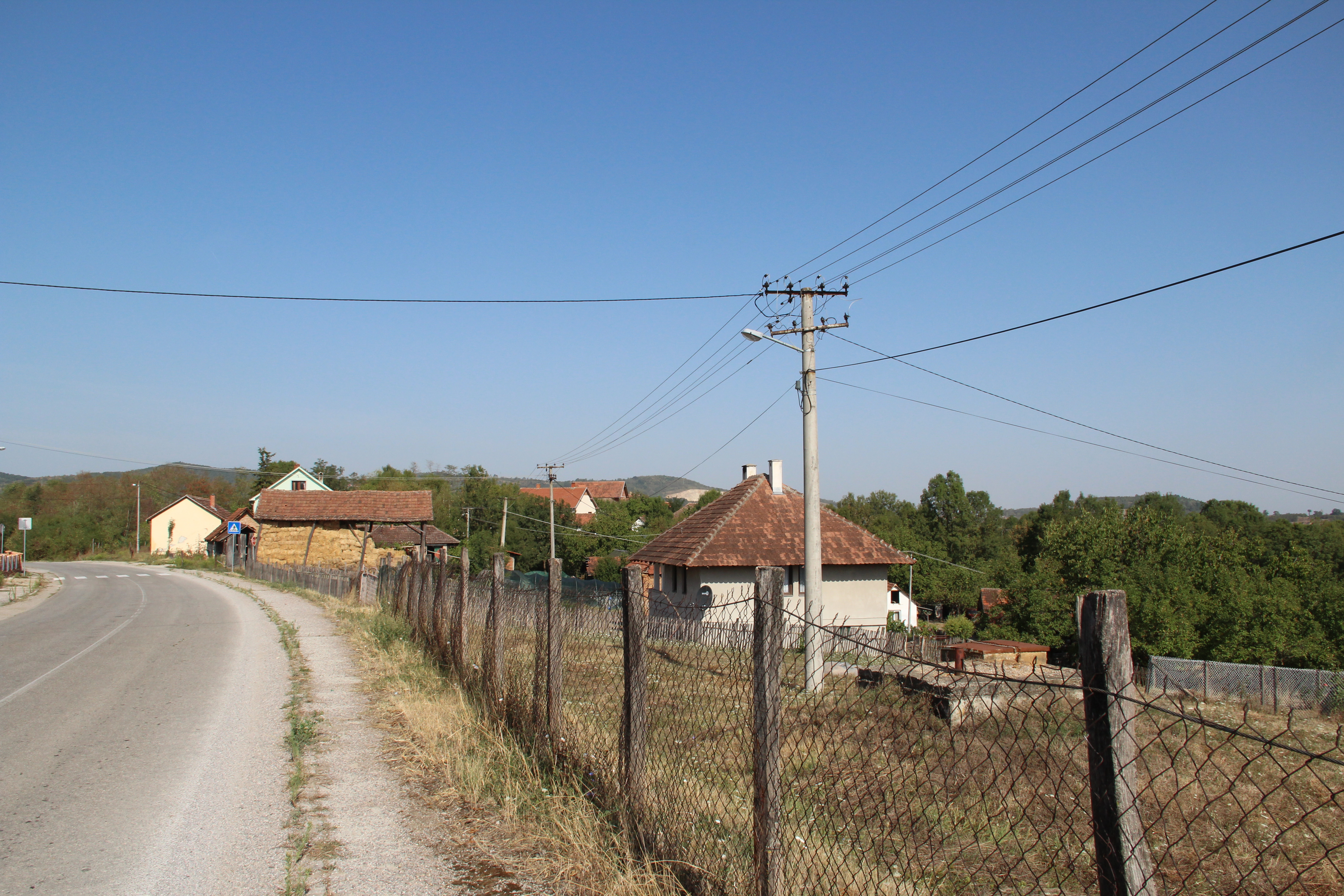

- Location within Serbia
- Coordinates: 44°20′04″N 20°06′00″E
- Country: Serbia
- District: Kolubara
- Municipality: Lajkovac
- Elevation: 571 ft (174 m)

Population (2011)
  - Total: 314
- Time zone: UTC+1 (CET)
  - Summer (DST): UTC+2 (CEST)

Ratkovac is a village in the municipality of Lajkovac, Serbia. According to the 2011 census, the village has a population of 314 inhabitants.

== Population ==
Population of Ratkovac
1948	1953	1961	1971	1981	1991	2002	2011
647	644	581	504	471	396	378	314
