= Lajkovac =

Lajkovac Лајковац (Serbian)
- Town and municipality
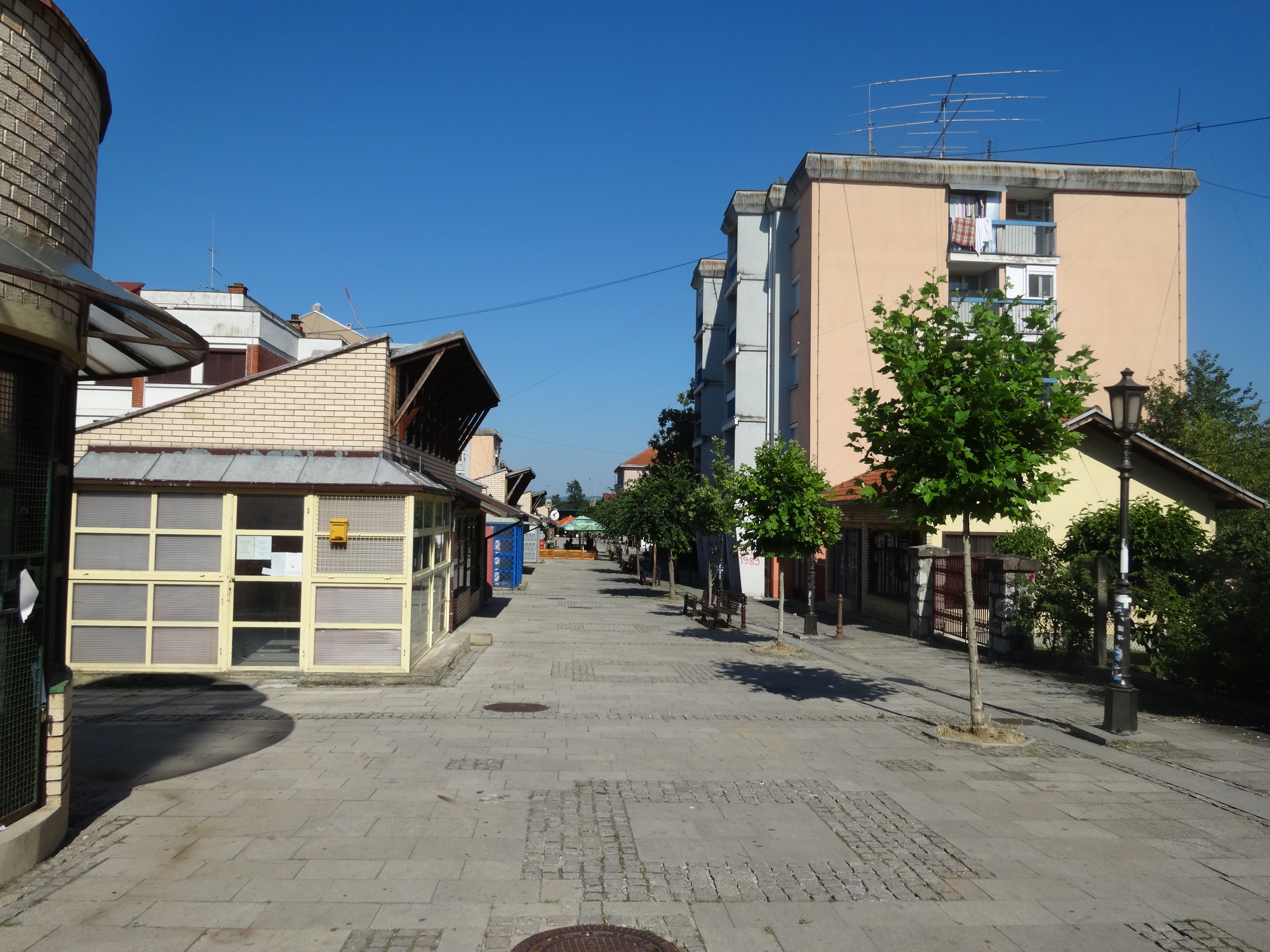
- Town center promenade

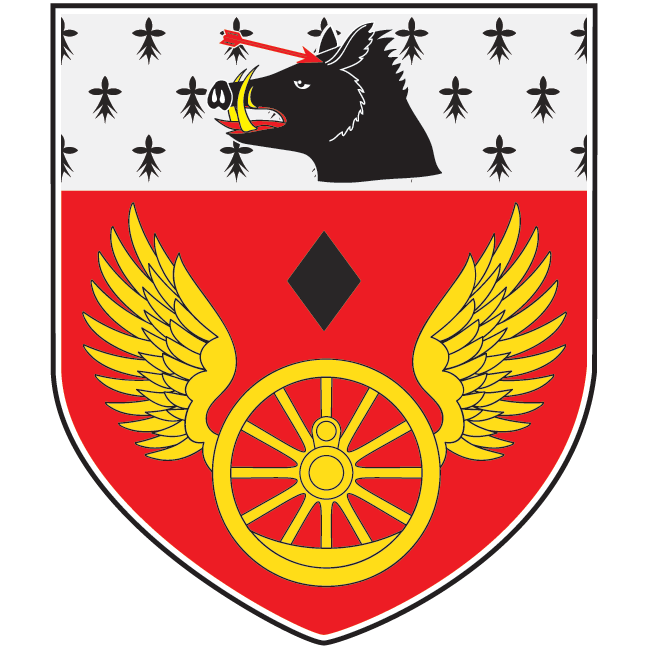
- Coat of arms

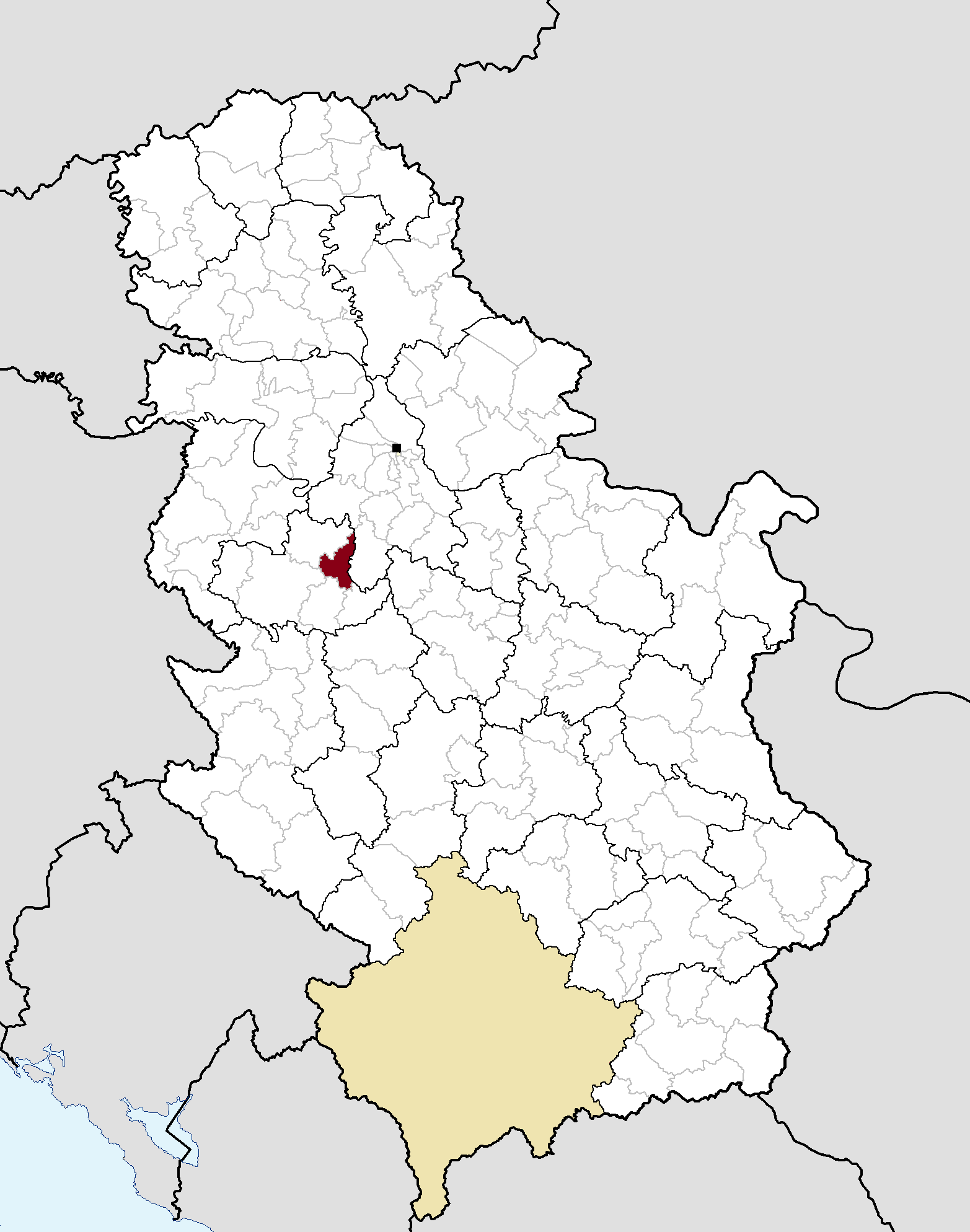
- Location of the municipality of Lajkovac within Serbia
- Coordinates: 44°22′N 20°10′E
- Country: Serbia
- Region: Šumadija and Western Serbia
- District: Kolubara
- Settlements: 19

Government
  - Mayor: Andrija Živković (SNS)

Area
  - Town: 2.23 km^{2} (0.86 sq mi)
  - Municipality: 186 km^{2} (72 sq mi)
- Elevation: 113 m (371 ft)

Population (2022 census)
  - Town: 3,211
  - Town density: 1,440/km^{2} (3,730/sq mi)
  - Municipality: 13,825
  - Municipality density: 74.3/km^{2} (193/sq mi)
- Time zone: UTC+1 (CET)
  - Summer (DST): UTC+2 (CEST)
- Postal code: 14224
- Area code: +381(0)14
- Car plates: VA
- Website: www.lajkovac.org.rs

Lajkovac (Serbian Cyrillic: Лајковац) is a town and municipality located in the Kolubara District of western Serbia. As of 2022, it has population of 3,211 inhabitants, while the municipality has 13,825 inhabitants.

It is located in the valley of river Kolubara and near the Ibar highway.

== History ==
In the surrounding villages of Jabučje, Skobalj, Nepričava and Bogovađa there are remains from the Roman period. At Ćelije there is an archaeological locality Anine, also from the Roman times, with the well preserved Roman villa and a major estate around it. Anine is located 1 km (0.62 mi) from the confluence of the Ljig river into the Kolubara. There are also artifacts and monuments from the Serbian medieval period, First Serbian Uprising, Second Serbian Uprising and both World Wars, especially World War I as the major Battle of Kolubara against the invading Austro-Hungarian army was fought in the area in November-December 1914.

The town was heavily flooded by the Kolubara river. In July 1926 the water destroyed the entire agricultural output, also flooding the railway. The area was also damaged during the catastrophic 2014 Southeast Europe floods.

== Settlements ==
Aside from the town of Lajkovac, the following settlements are comprised in the municipality of Lajkovac:

- Jabučje
- Lajkovac (village)
- Bogovađa
- Nepričava
- Vračević
- Donji Lajkovac
- Rubribreza
- Markova Crkva
- Ratkovac
- Pridvorica
- Mali Borak
- Skobalj
- Pepeljevac
- Slovac
- Stepanje
- Strmovo
- Bajevac
- Ćelije

== Demographics ==
Historical population
Year	Pop.	±% p.a.
1948	17,587	—
1953	18,411	+0.92%
1961	18,985	+0.38%
1971	18,270	−0.38%
1981	17,950	−0.18%
1991	17,716	−0.13%
2002	17,062	−0.34%
2011	15,475	−1.08%
2022	13,825	−1.02%

According to the 2011 census results, the municipality of Lajkovac has 15,475 inhabitants.

=== Ethnic groups ===
The ethnic composition of the municipality:

Ethnic group	Population	%
Serbs	14,381	92.93%
Roma	775	5.01%
Montenegrins	22	0.14%
Yugoslavs	16	0.10%
Macedonians	13	0.08%
Croats	11	0.07%
Others	257	1.66%
Total	15,475	

== Economy and infrastructure ==
Unlike the past, when the railway was the leading employer in the area, most of Lajkovac inhabitants today work at surface pits of the Kolubara coal basin, that stretch on the municipal areas of Lajkovac, Lazarevac and Ub. Other major industries include agriculture (especially dairy and fruit production), electricity wiring metal constructions and textile manufacturing.

Thanks to the surface mining, Lajkovac is usually among the municipalities with the highest average wage and employment figures in Serbia.

Tourist spots in the town and its vicinity include the Bogovađa Monastery and the memorial Saint George's Church in the village of Ćelije.

Lajkovac was well known for its watermills (Serbian: vodenica). There are several still operational in 2018 though they are mostly a tourist attractions today. The most popular are Jolića vodenica, Kumova vodenica, Ilića vodenica and Sretenovića vodenica. Jolića vodenica is location of an annual folk festival Hajdučki rastanak.

The following table gives a preview of total number of employed people per their core activity (as of 2017):

Activity	Total
Agriculture, forestry and fishing	29
Mining	1,313
Processing industry	543
Distribution of power, gas and water	-
Distribution of water and water waste management	84
Construction	164
Wholesale and retail, repair	293
Traffic, storage and communication	112
Hotels and restaurants	65
Media and telecommunications	15
Finance and insurance	18
Property stock and charter	4
Professional, scientific, innovative and technical activities	50
Administrative and other services	20
Administration and social assurance	144
Education	285
Healthcare and social work	112
Art, leisure and recreation	54
Other services	39
Total	3,344

== Railway significance ==
The first railway line to pass through Lajkovac was a 760-millimeter (Bosnian gauge) line from Obrenovac to Valjevo which became operational on 14 September 1908. Two years later, Lajkovac got another line to Mladenovac. Just before the outbreak of World War I, the Serbian government started construction of line to Čačak, but the early war operations halted the development. In 1914, Dual Monarchy army stormed the city and destroyed much of the infrastructure; shortly afterwards, however the same force continued construction of a line to Čačak. After the end of the war in 1921, Čačak line was completed, connecting Lajkovac with Sarajevo and the Adriatic seaports of Dubrovnik and Herceg Novi. In 1928, the Obrenovac line was extended to Belgrade, which promoted the town into a railway hub of major importance.

The lots around the railway were quickly urbanized and mostly turned into the kafanas. In the late 1930s there were 11 kafanas in Lajkovac, as people had to make connections in Lajkovac since it was a crossroad from all four sides (Belgrade, Aranđelovac, Mladenovac, Sarajevo). Especially popular was the Železnička restoracija ("Railway restaurant"), which is still operation as of March 2018. Among notable frequent guests were politician Mehmed Spaho and mathematician Mika Petrović Alas. The town prospered greatly becoming a major railway crossroads and this period is today considered as the Lajkovac's "Golden Age". There were 41 railway tracks in town itself, with one train arriving every 10 minutes. At one point, there were 1,500 railwaymen working on a railroad. The first train using the standard gauge reached Lajkovac on 7 July 1968. The decline of the Yugoslav Railways narrow-gauge network in 1960s led to a decision that all narrow-gauge lines should cease operation during the 1970s. At the same time, the Belgrade-Bar standard gauge line passed through Lajkovac.

Much of the narrow-gauge infrastructure remains in the town today, such as a water tower (nicknamed Buzometar), turntable, roundhouse and many rolling stock sheds. All that infrastructure except for the water tower still serves standard-gauge locomotive stock. There are plans to convert these facilities into a railway museum.

== Trivia ==
The traditional song Ide Mile Lajkovačkom prugom (Mile walks down the Lajkovac railway) is about the town; it is a staple of Serbian folk repertoire, with versions recorded by Tozovac, Lepa Lukić, Šaban Šaulić, Braća Bajić and many others.

== Gallery ==
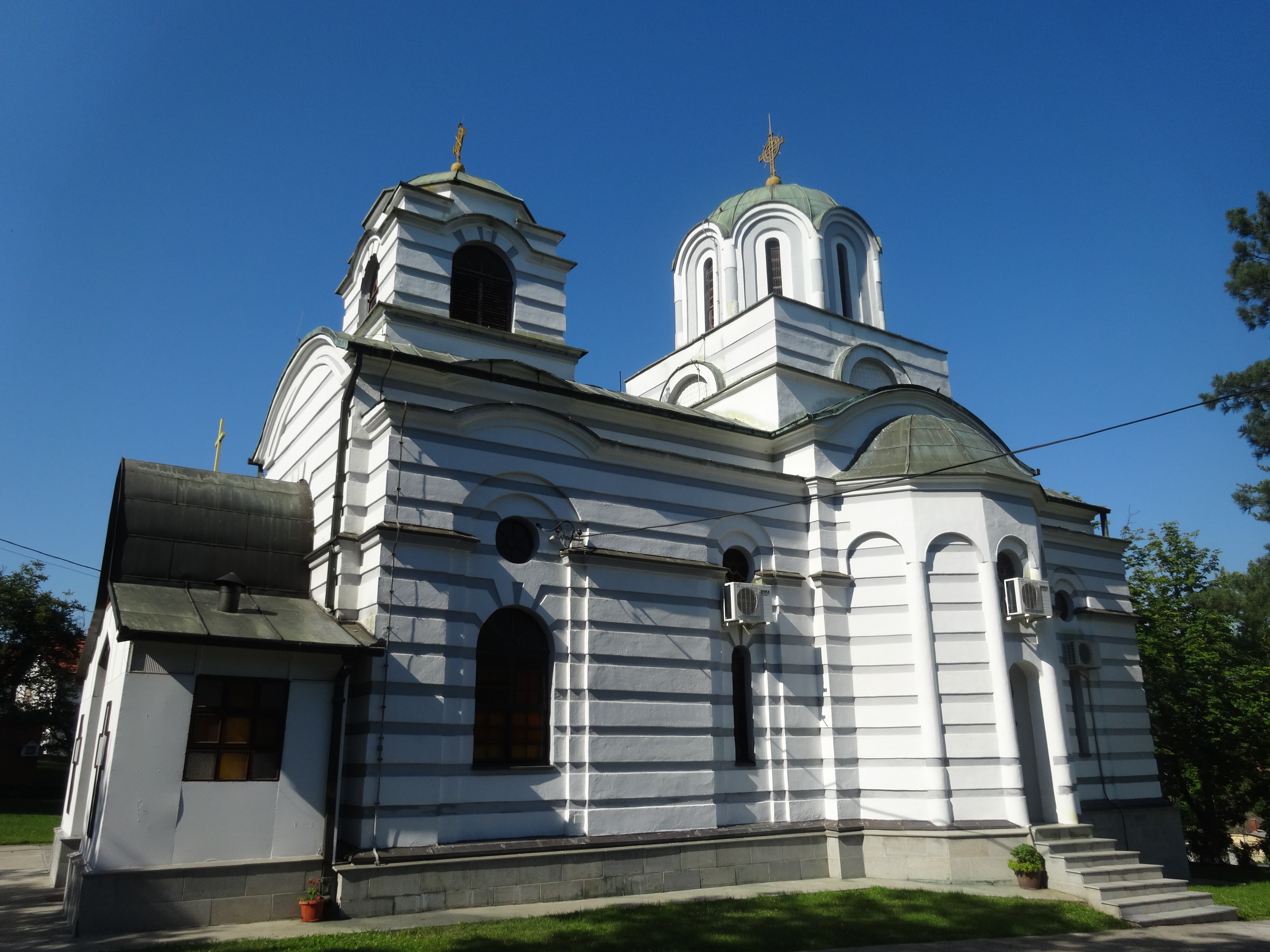
Orthodox Church in Lajkovac

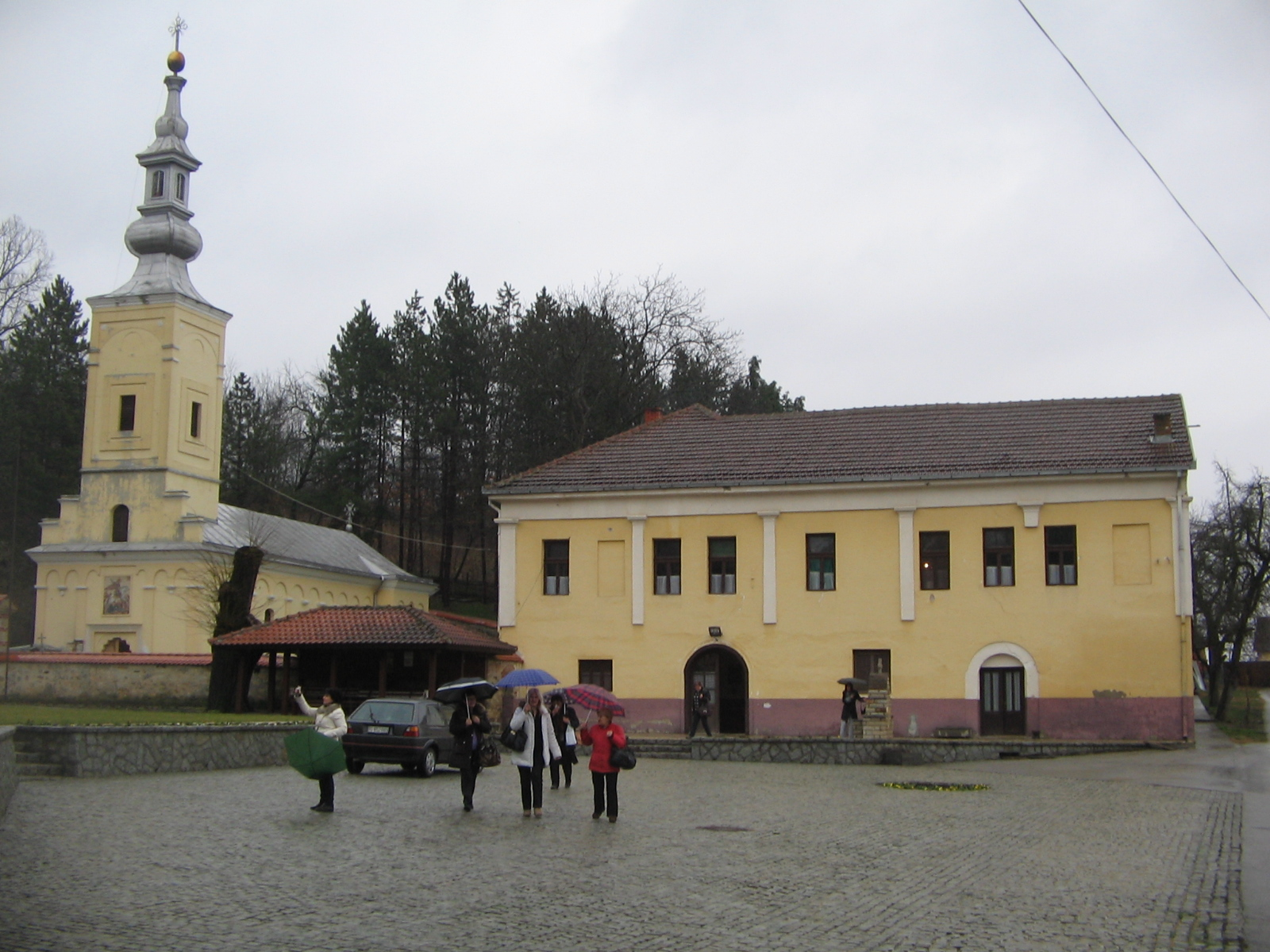
Monastery Bogovađa

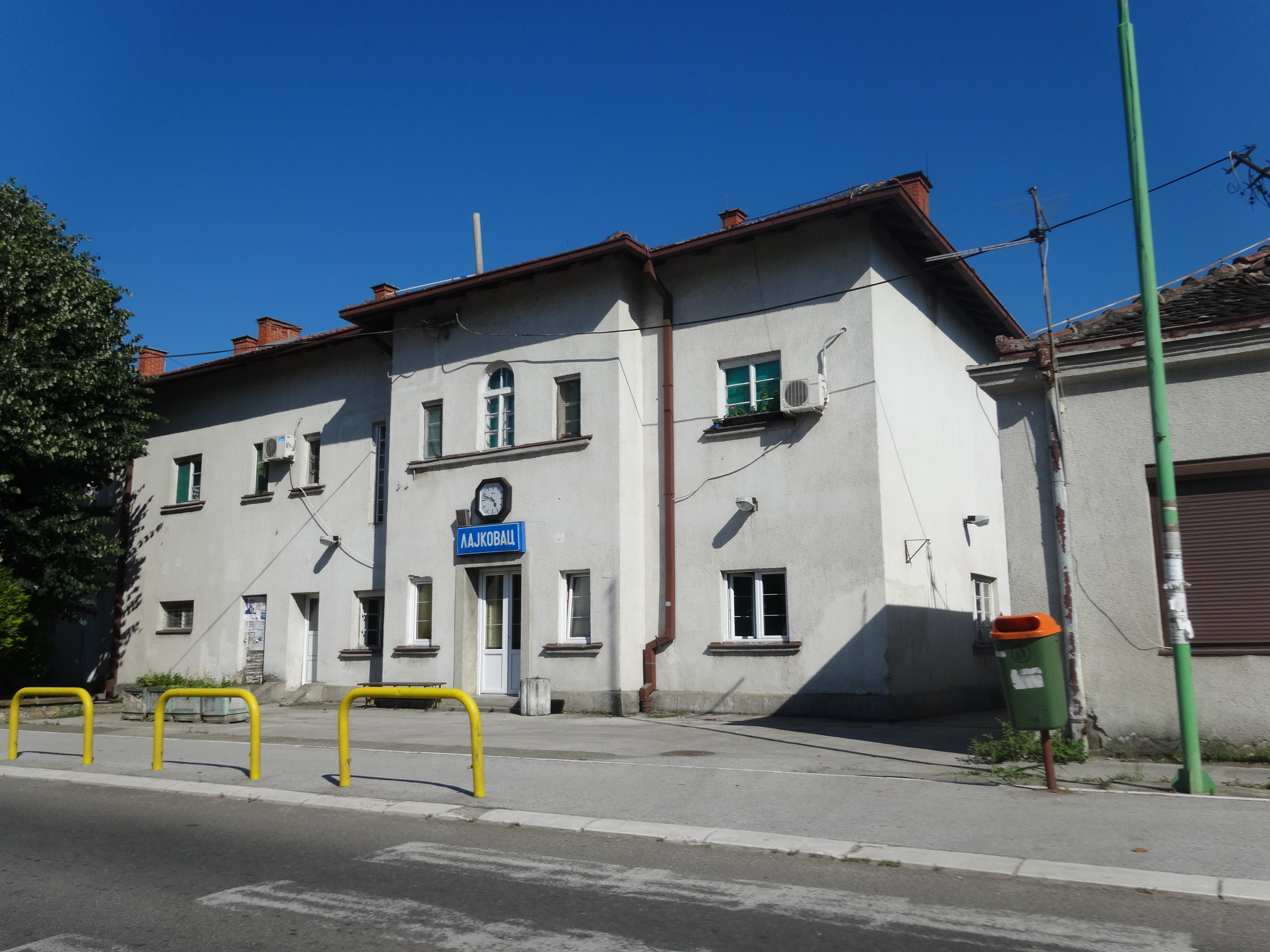
Lajkovac Railway Station building

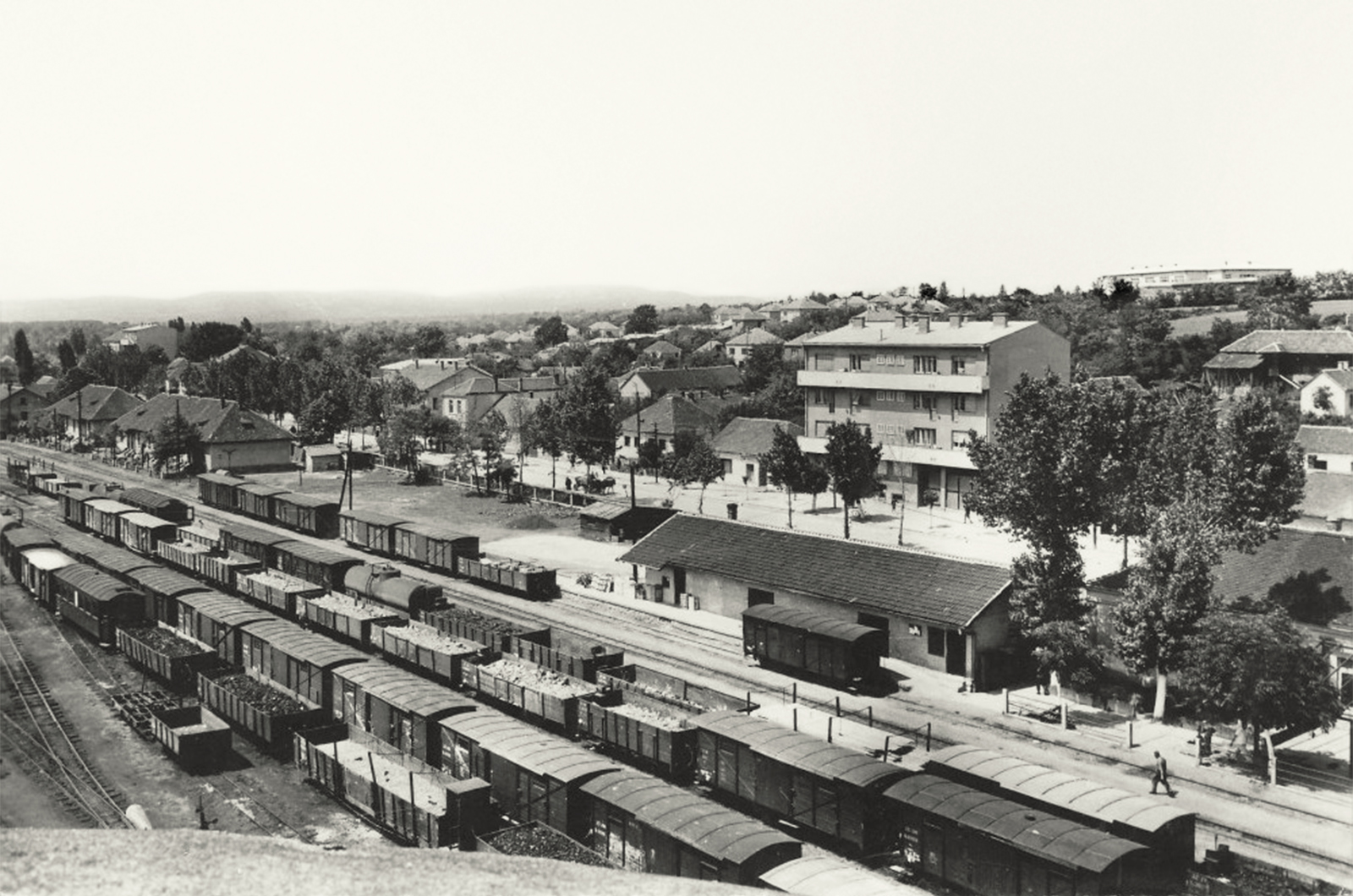
Lajkovac Railway Station in 1965

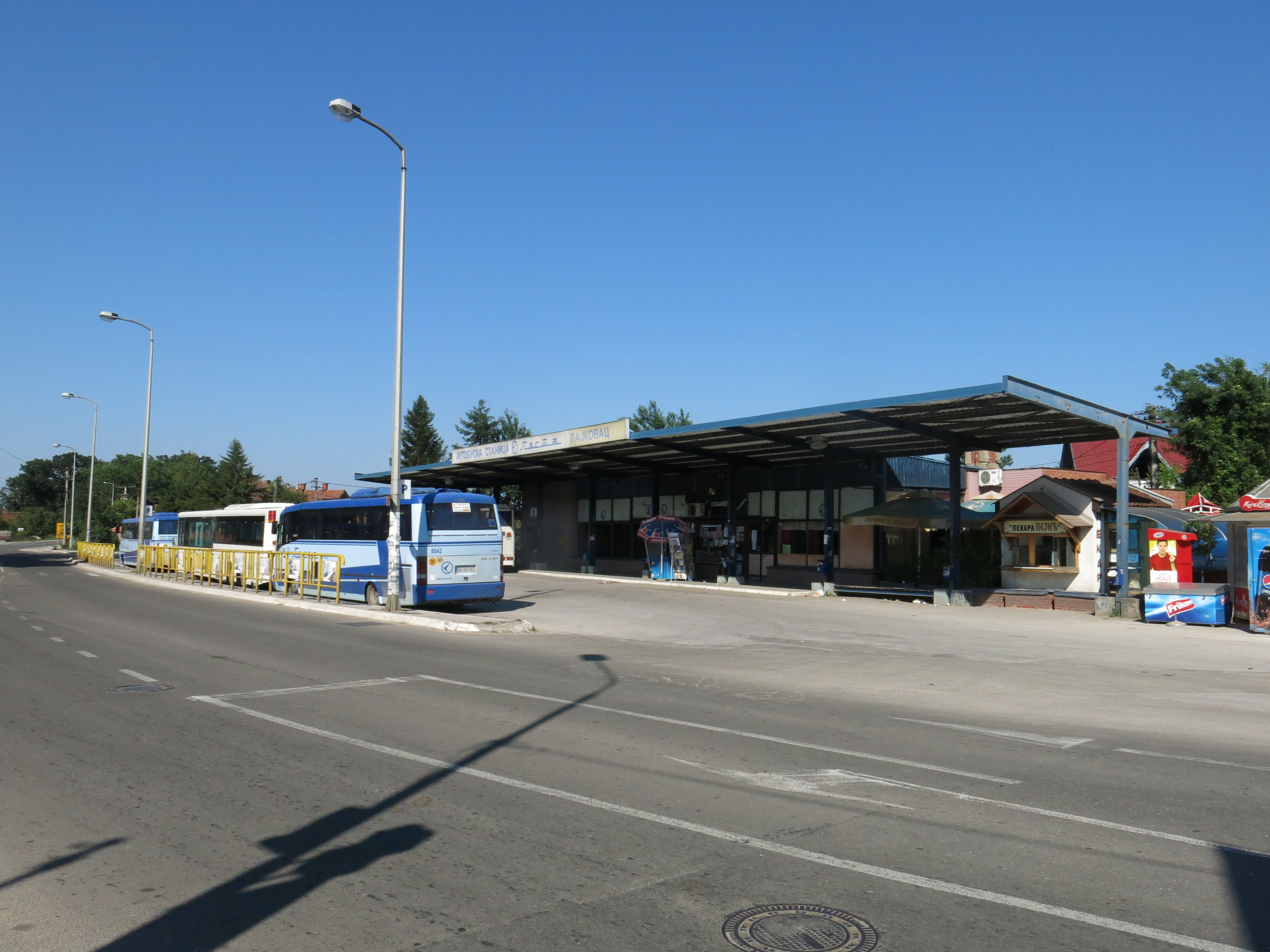
Lajkovac Bus Station

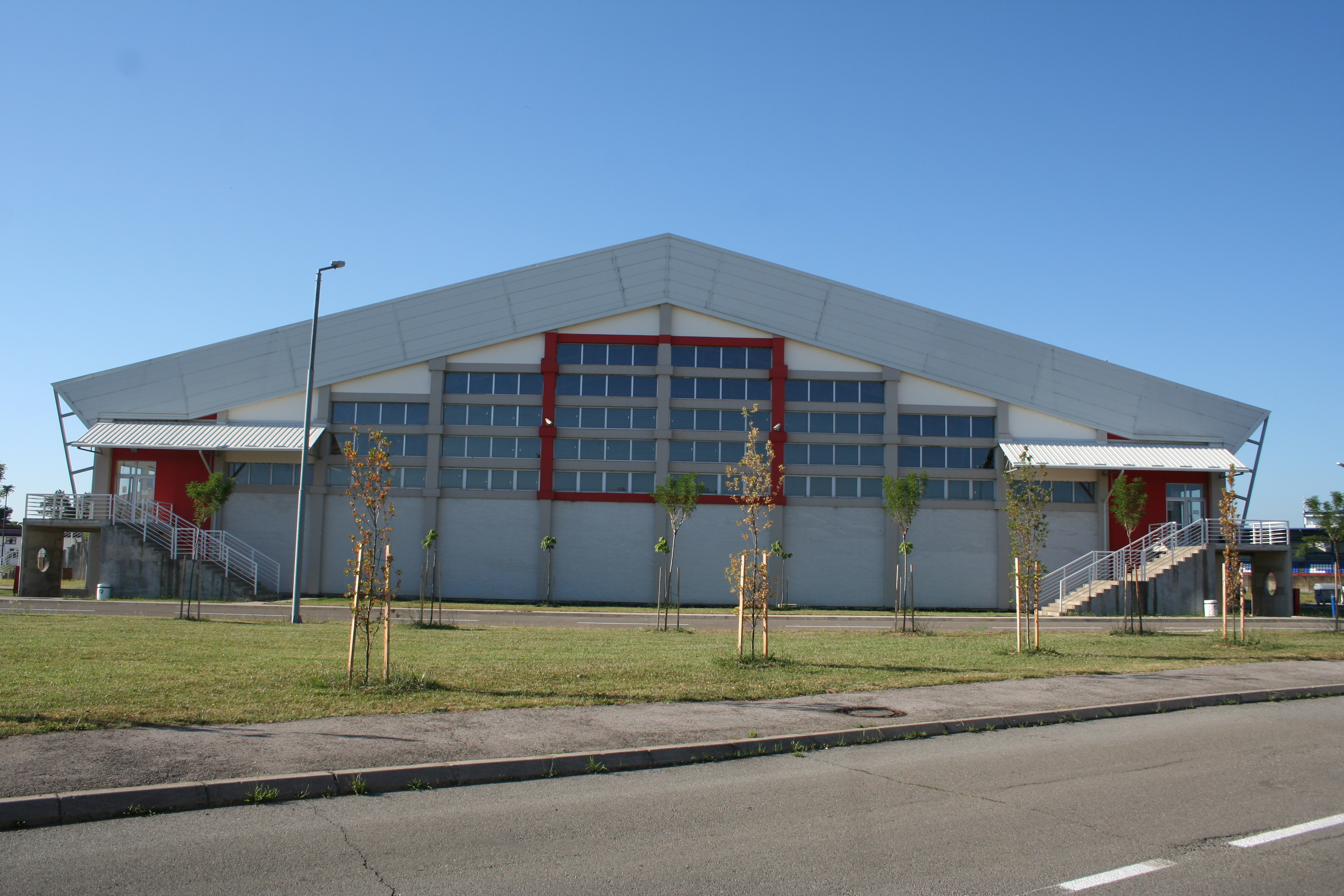
Lajkovac Sports Hall
