= Valjevska Tamnava =

Historical subregion in Serbian

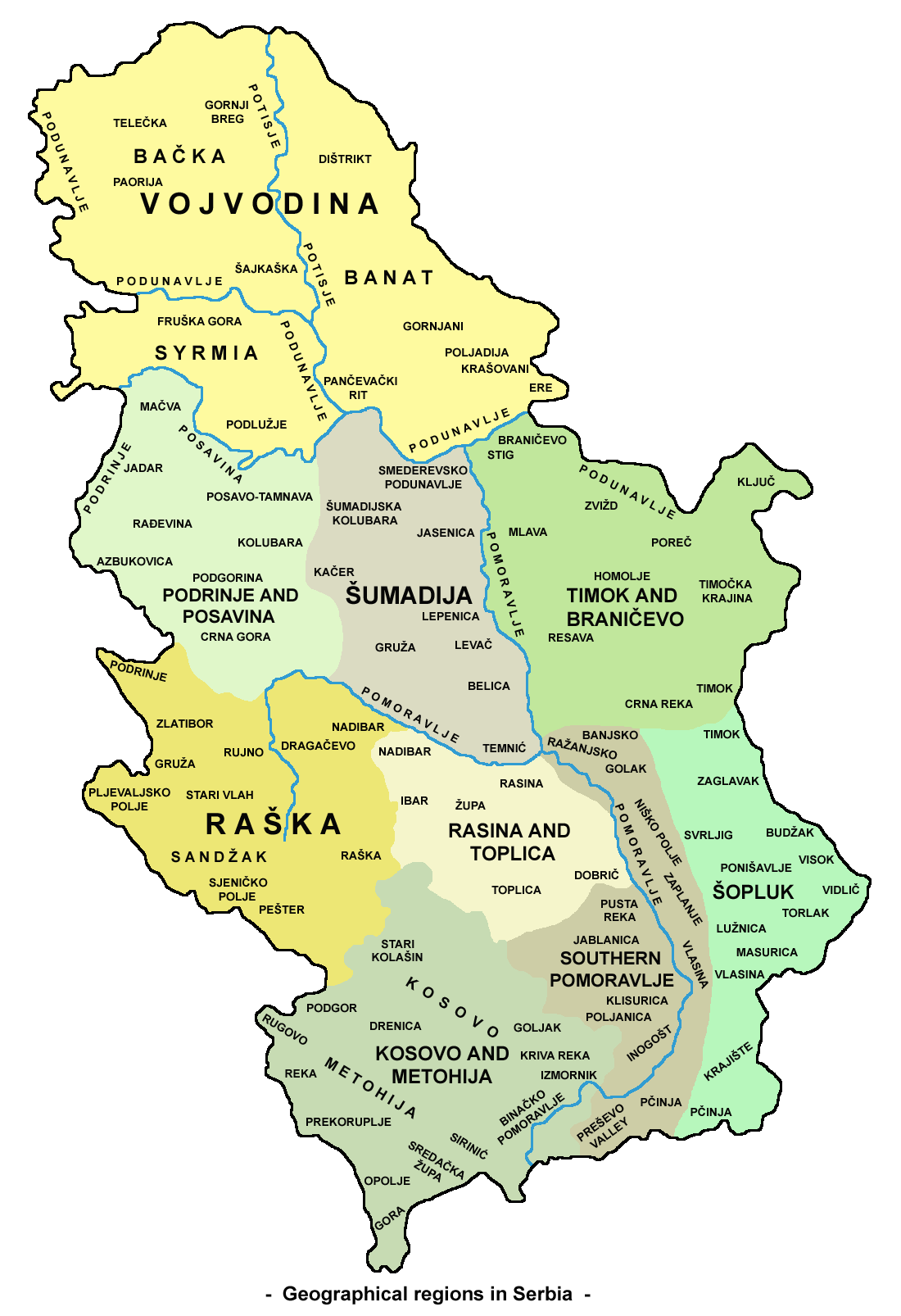
A version of regions of Serbia, part of Valjevska Tamnava noted as "Posavo-Tamnava".

Valjevska Tamnava (Serbian: Ваљевска Тамнава) is a historical subregion (or microregion) in Kolubara in Serbia. It includes villages in the area of Obrenovac, Lajkovac, Ub, Valjevo and Koceljeva. It was a knežina (Christian self-governing village group) in the Sanjak of Smederevo and a knežina (administrative unit) in Revolutionary Serbia.

Further, the Posavina (Sava basin) region includes the microregions of Posavina and Posavotamnava.

== Geography ==
Pavlović (1912) describes Valjevska Tamnava in the wider sense as stretching from the Kolubara river in the east, Sava river in the north, Vukodraž river in the west, and Vlašić mountain in the south.

== History ==
=== Middle Ages ===
In the Middle Ages, during the Banate of Macsó of Hungary and the Serbian Despotate, the župa (counties) of Beljin, Nepričava, Kolubara, Tamnava and Ub, were mentioned in the 14th- and 15th centuries in the area of Tamnava.

=== Serbian Revolution ===
During the First Serbian Uprising (1804–13), the Valjevska Tamnava area was organized into a knežina (administrative unit) of Revolutionary Serbia, belonging to the Valjevo nahiya. The Valjevo nahiya had included three knežina (Christian self-governing village groups) prior to 1804, the Posavina (or "Valjevska Tamnava"), Jadar, Ljig/Podgor (or "Valjevska Podgorina"). Prior to the uprising, Free Corps veteran Aleksa Nenadović from Brankovina served as the obor-knez of Posavina–Tamnava. He was executed by the Dahije in the Slaughter of the Knezes in January 1804.

On 14 February [O.S. 2 February] 1804, Serb notables met at Orašac in the Kragujevac nahiya and decided to rise up under the command of Karađorđe. Aleksa's brother Jakov Nenadović had succeeded as obor-knez of Tamnava, and when hearing that the Kragujevac, Rudnik and most of the Belgrade nahiyas had risen up, he and his nephew, Aleksa's son, the archpriest Matija Nenadović, decided to organize rebellion in the Valjevo nahiya. On 27 February [O.S. 15 February] 1804, or the following day, the Serb notables of the Valjevo nahiya gathered at the Brankovina height (Brankovački vis) and decided to rise up against the Dahije. Some 700 men were gathered, but they were ill-equipped. Jakov took 300 men of Posavina and Tamnava and went to Beljin and fought with the Šabac Turk detachment on 6 March [O.S. 23 February] 1804, with many wounded on both sides. The rebels under Matija Nenadović and Nikola Grbović took over Valjevo in March and at the same time, Jakov Nenadović destroyed an enemy unit at Svileuva.

The Valjevska Tamnava rebel unit participated at Svileuva, Beljin, Čučuge, Bratačić, Bukovica, Mišar, Loznica, Lešnica. Among notable leaders, comrades of the Nenadović family of the Valjevo nahiya and Luka Lazarević of the Šabac nahiya, were Isailo Lazić from Krtinska, Petar Erić from Zvečka, priest Leontije Marković from Urovci, Živan Petrović from Kalenić, Vasilj Pavlović from Bajevac, Đura Kostić from Crvena Jabuka, hegumen Jeremija from Grabovica, Milovan Zujalović from Tulari, Živko Dabić from Gola Glava, Jovan Tomić-Belov from Donje Crniljevo, Mihailo Gluvac from Kamenica, Rade Radosavljević from Goločelo, and others.

== Notable people ==
- Juriša Mihailović (Serbian: Јуриша Михаиловић) was a Serb revolutionary, a captain (kapetan) in the Valjevska Tamnava knežina during the First Serbian Uprising. He was born in Grabovac. Juriša was a merchant, regarded the richest in the Valjevska Tamnava area. Juriša and Petar Erić participated at the Ostružnica Assembly (7–16 May 1804), accompanying archpriest Matija Nenadović, as representatives of the Valjevo nahija. Juriša participated at the Zemun Meeting (10 May 1804) as one of the 16 Serbian representatives. As one of the representatives of the Valjevo nahija, he signed the April 1805 petition to the Sultan.

== Sources ==
- Batalaka, Lazar Arsenijević (1898). Историја српског устанка [History of the Serbian Uprising]. Vol. I. Izd. Batalakinoga fonda – via Google Books.
- Đorđević, Tihomir R. (1921). "Кнежине у Србији за време прве владе Кнеза Милоша". Српски књижевни гласник, нова серија. 4: 508–518, 600–611.
- Drašković, Radovan M. (1987). Valjevo u prošlosti: prilozi za zavičajnu istoriju. Milić Rakić. ISBN 978-86-7173-008-2.
- Jovanović, Milka; Jevtić, Milan (1978). "Тамнава". Гласник Етнографског института. XXVII. Научно дело: 69-.
- Milićević, Milan Đ. (1888). Поменик знаменитих људи у српског народа новијега доба. Издање Чупићеве задужбине – via Archive.org.
- Nenadović, Konstantin N. (1884). Живот и дела великог Ђорђа Петровића Кара-Ђорђа [Life and Deeds of Great Đorđe Petrović Kara-Đorđe]. Vol. II (1 ed.). Vienna: У Штампарији Јована Н. Вернаја – via Google Books.
- Nenadović, Konstantin N. (1903) [1883]. Живот и дела великог Ђорђа Петровића Кара-Ђорђа [Life and Deeds of Great Đorđe Petrović Kara-Đorđe]. Vol. I (2 ed.). Belgrade: Штампа Савића и Комп. – via Archive.org.
- Novaković, Stojan (1904). Устанак на дахије 1804 [Uprising against the Dahije]. Штампано у Државној штампарији – via Archive.org.
- Pavlović, Ljubomir (1912). "Ваљевска Тамнава: Антропогеографија ваљевске Тамнаве". СЕЗб XVIII, Насеља 8: 381–635.
- Petrović, Aleksandar (2011). "Ваљевска Тамнава: насеља, порекло становништва, обичаји". ЈП Службени гласник Србије и САНУ. САНУ.
- Protić, Kosta (1893). "Ратни догађаји из првога српског устанка под Карађорђем Петровићем 1804—1813". Годишњица Николе Чупића. XIII. Državna štamparija.
- Vukićević, Milenko M. (1907). Карађорђе (1752–1804). Vol. 1. Државна штампарија Краљевине Србије – via Archive.org.
- Челиковић, Борисав (2011). Колубара и Подгорина: насеља, порекло становништва, обичаји. Службени гласник. ISBN 978-86-519-1046-6.
