= St. Christopher Monastery =

Serbian Orthodox monastery in Mislođin, Serbia

Monastery of Saint Christopher
- Манастир Светог Христофора
- Monastery church

- Location within Serbia

Monastery information
- Order: Serbian Orthodox
- Denomination: Serbian Orthodox Church
- Established: 1280
- Reestablished: 2014
- Dedication: Saint Christopher
- Consecrated: 4 October 2015
- Archdiocese: Archdiocese of Belgrade and Karlovci

People
- Founder: King Dragutin
- Abbess: Justina

Architecture
- Functional status: Active
- Style: Morava school
- Groundbreaking: 12 November 2014

Site
- Location: Mislođin
- Country: Serbia
- Coordinates: 44.6417°N 20.2402°E
- Visible remains: Foundations of the older church and fragments of frescoes
- Public access: yes

The Monastery of Saint Christopher (Serbian: Манастир Светог Христофора, romanized: Manastir Svetog Hristofora) is a Serbian Orthodox monastery located in the village of Mislođin within the City Municipality of Obrenovac, in Belgrade, Serbia. It belongs to the Archdiocese of Belgrade and Karlovci of the Serbian Orthodox Church. The monastery church was built over the remains of an earlier triconchal church, whose foundations are preserved within a crypt beneath the present structure.

== Tradition ==
According to tradition, a Christian church existed in the area of present-day Mislođin during Roman times, and in the 13th century, King Dragutin used its building materials to construct the Monastery of Saint Christopher. Historically, the monastery owned the villages of Mislođin and Jasenak, part of Barič, watermills on the Kolubara River, fishponds at Jezero and Barič, beehives at Kovančine, and vineyards in Jasenak.

The monastery was destroyed in 1521 during the advance of the Ottoman army from Šabac toward Belgrade. The church is mentioned in 16th-century historical sources; the census of imperial hass lands in the Belgrade nahiye from 1560 records the Monastery of Saint Christopher near the village of Barič. It was destroyed for the final time during Habsburg–Ottoman conflicts in the 18th century. Materials from its ruins and tombstones were used in 1824 to build the old church in Palež (Obrenovac), and when a new church was erected, these materials were subsequently transferred to build the church in Barič in 1868.

== Remains of the earlier church ==
Since 1966, following archaeological research by the Belgrade City Museum, it has been determined that the church was built in the 15th century during the reign of Despot Stefan Lazarević and renovated in the second half of the 16th century. Based on its triconchal plan, the Monastery of Saint Christopher is associated with the Morava school style of architecture in central Serbia.

The remains of the earlier sacral building are located on a slope facing the Bačevački stream and have been excavated and conserved. Built from brick with thick mortar joints, the walls of the nave are only partially preserved, while the altar apse is completely destroyed. Fragments of frescoes survive in the left conch and on the western wall of the narthex. Based on its ground plan and construction materials, the church dates to a later period rather than the 13th century, representing a modest village church of the medieval era.

== Renewal of the monastery ==
The restoration of the monastery was initiated by nun Justina (now the abbess of the monastery), who arrived in Serbia from Canada at the end of 2010 at the behest of Metropolitan Amfilohije. Upon her arrival, she found the site overgrown with brush and the remaining structure reduced to bare walls without basic amenities. She oversaw the clearing of the site, the construction of an access road, and the acquisition of the necessary funds and permits.

Following the completion of project documentation and regulatory approval, construction of the new church began on 12 November 2014, funded largely by donor (*ktetor*) Ljubinka Pejica, on the feast day of Saint King Dragutin. During the excavation of the new foundations, the relics of martyred monks were uncovered and are now preserved in a reliquary within the crypt of the monastery church.

The monastery church was consecrated on 4 October 2015 by Irinej, Serbian Patriarch, in the presence of clergy, donors, and numerous believers.

== Gallery ==
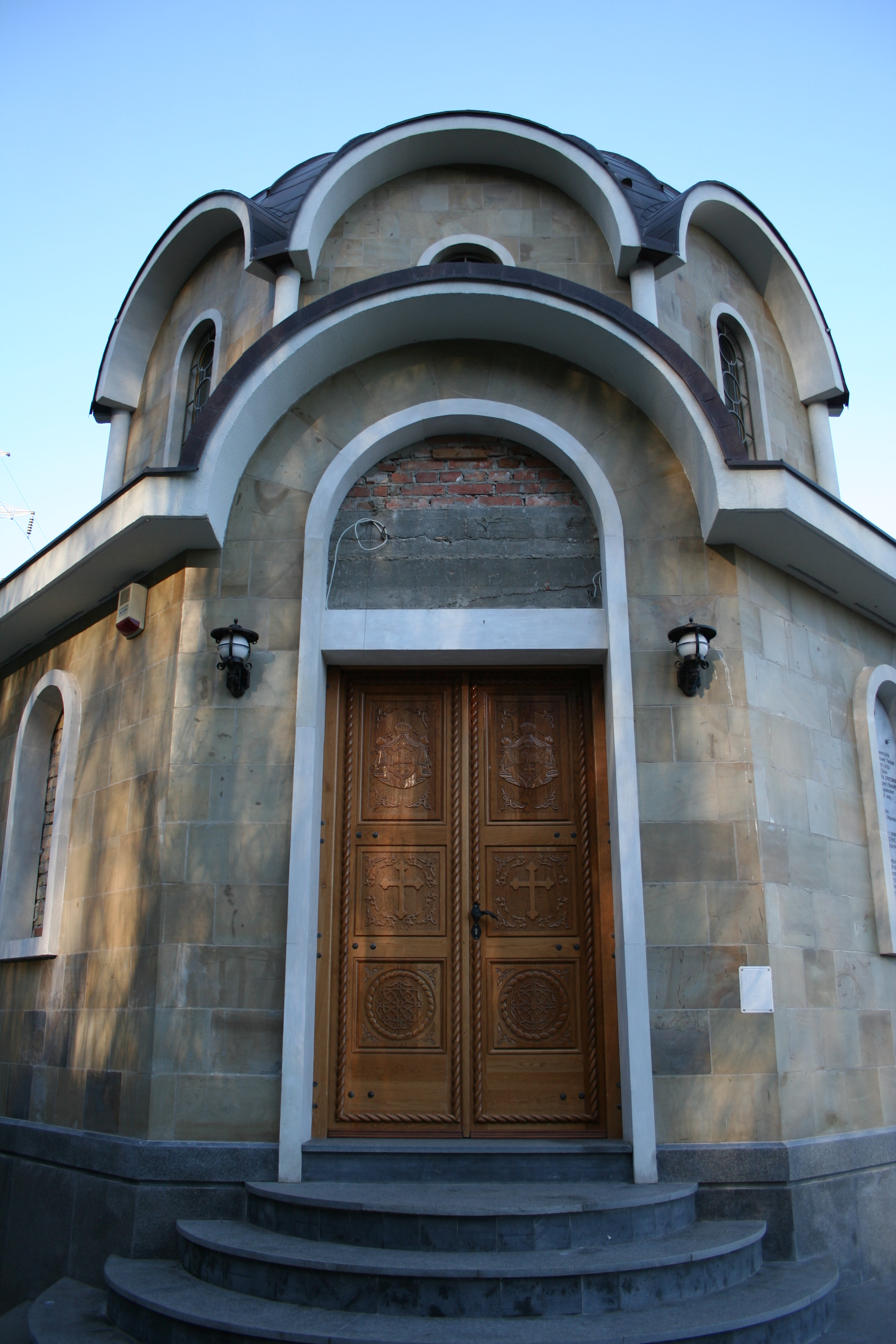

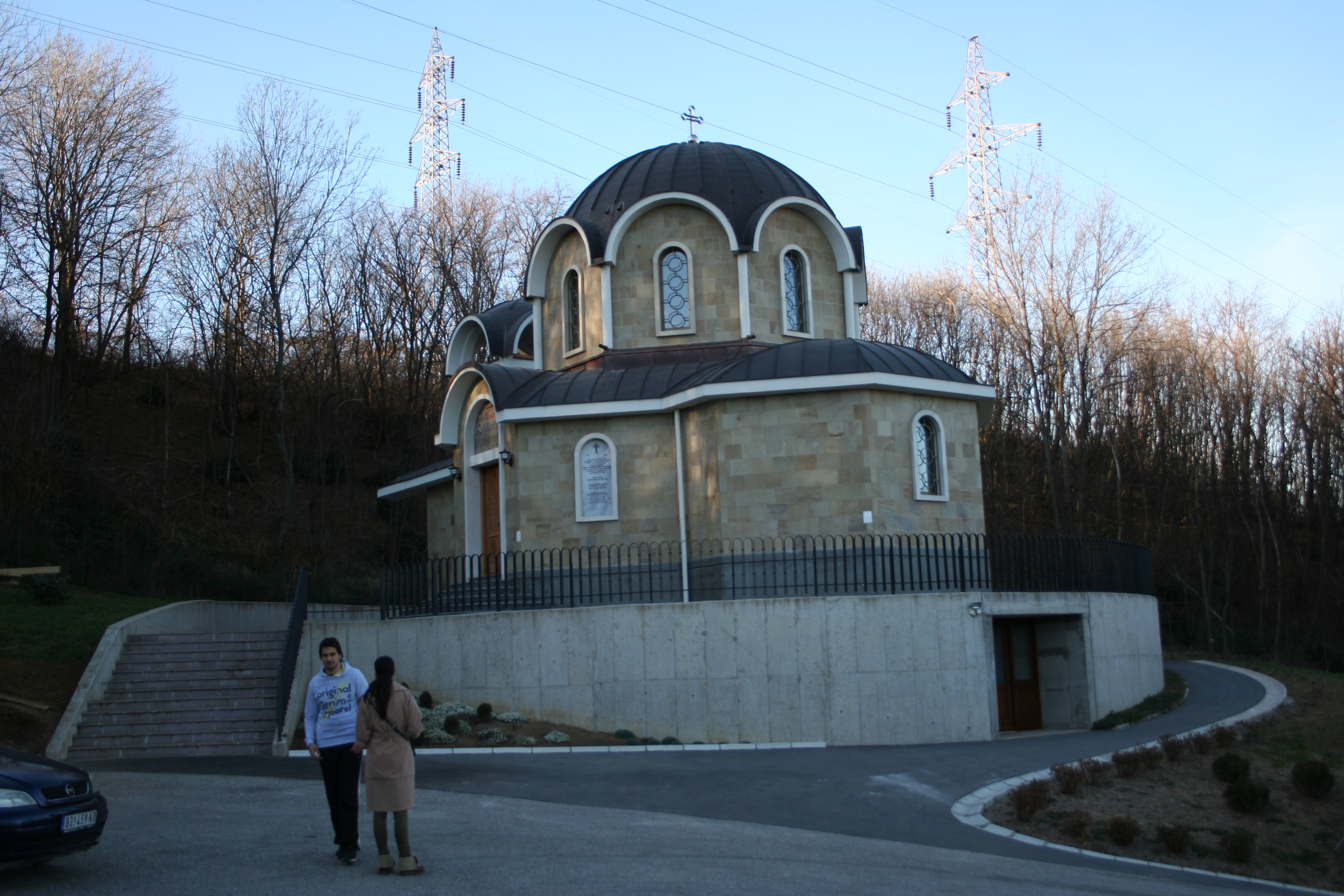
