= Jasenak =

Jasenak may refer to:

- Jasenak, Serbia, a village near Obrenovac
- Jasenak, Croatia, a village near Ogulin
