= Ušće =

Ušće may refer to:

- Ušće, Belgrade, a settlement in Belgrade, Serbia
- Ušće (Obrenovac), a village in the municipality of Obrenovac, city of Belgrade, Serbia
- Ušće (Kraljevo), a village in the municipality of Kraljevo, Serbia

or:

- Ušće Tower, a building in Ušće, Belgrade, Serbia
- Ušće Tower 2, a building in Ušće, Belgrade, Serbia
- Ušće Shopping Center, a shopping center in Ušće, Belgrade, Serbia
