= Mala Moštanica =

- Village
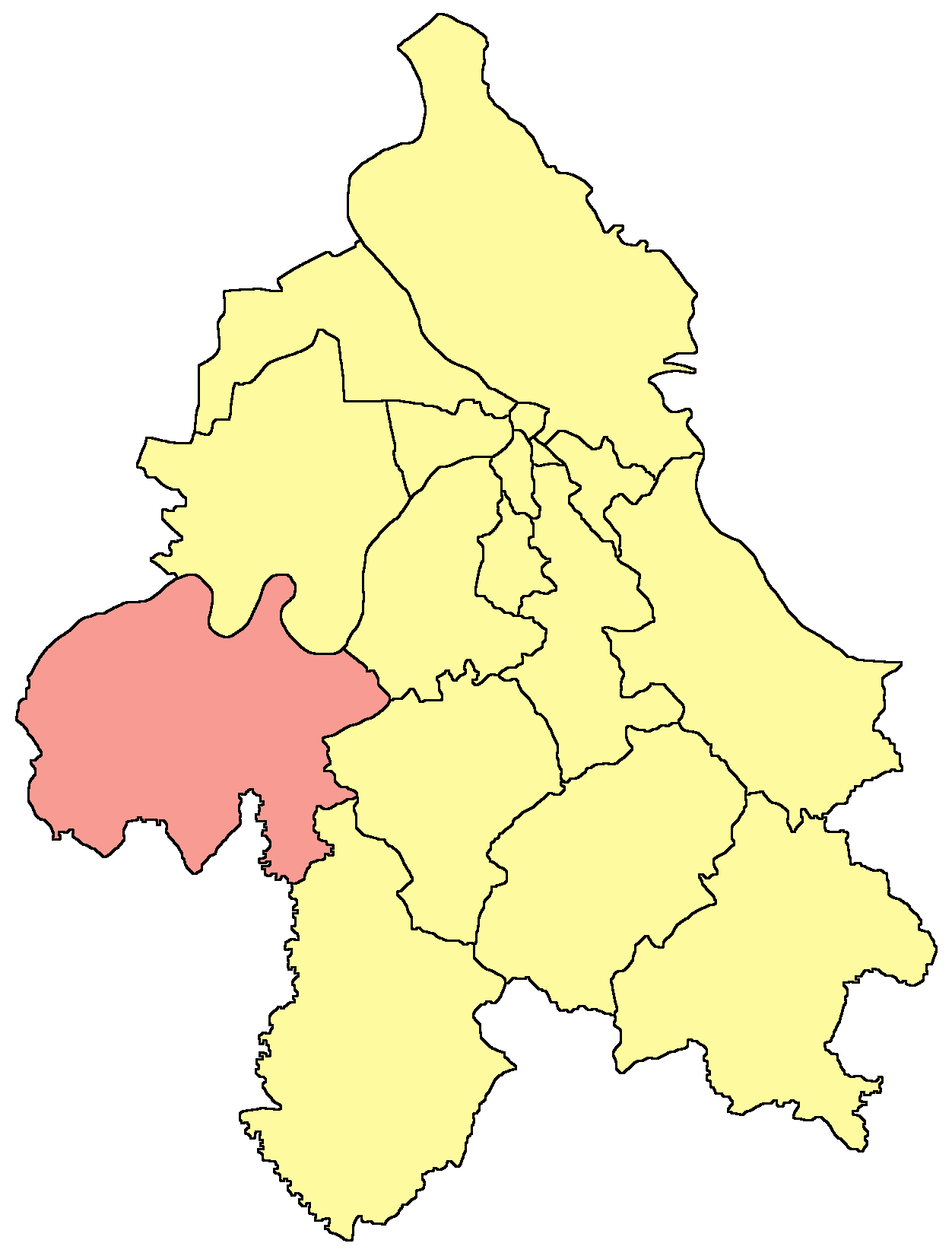
- Belgrade map.png
- Interactive map of Mala Moštanica
- Coordinates: 44.6461°N 20.3028°E
- Country: Serbia
- Municipality: Obrenovac

Area
  - Total: 10.71 km^{2} (4.14 sq mi)
- Elevation: 175 m (574 ft)

Population (2011)
  - Total: 1,805
  - Density: 168.5/km^{2} (436.5/sq mi)
- Time zone: UTC+1 (CET)
  - Summer (DST): UTC+2 (CEST)

Mala Moštanica is a village located in the municipality of Obrenovac, Belgrade, Serbia. As of 2011 census, it has a population of 1,805 inhabitants.

== Duboko forest ==
Mala Moštanica is separated from the Sava river by the Duboko forest. The forest spread in the areas of the neighboring settlements, but the majority is located in Mala Moštanica: Umka and Rucka in the Čukarica municipality on the east, and Barič in the Obrenovac municipality, on the west. Area along the river is a mass wasting zone. Downhill creep is located on the slope above the river, and is one of the largest and most active in Belgrade. Majority is located in Umka, though, where the entire neighborhood of Duboko developed on creeping soil.

City administration adopted a decree by which the 383 square kilometres (148 sq mi) of the forest will be protected as a natural monument, but the new state law on forests suppressed the decree in 1970, before it took effect, so the forest remained unprotected by the law.

From 2020 to 2022, over 11 hectares (27 acres) of the forest was cut. The thick oak forest was cleared, leaving a barren area which was covered by dense black locust grove. Residents and local ecology groups, some specifically founded for monitoring Duboko, protested. State forestry company which administers Duboko, "Srbijašume", claimed that they have done everything by the law, that the forest was in bad shape, and that they already planted seedlings on 5 hectares (12 acres). The company also stated that they will conduct forestation on 1 hectare (2.5 acres) each year, claiming it is optimal given the mass wasting. They also said that the local politicians were notified of the cutting, that the company has an FSC certificate which means they know what they are doing, and that public calls to stop cutting the forest are unscientific. Citizens also asked for neutral experts to check the forest, and demanded for the "Srbijašume" to place guards, ramps, and cameras, to clean the garbage, arrange the pathways, and arrange the wild locust grove which formed.

By November 2023, a 1.5 km (0.93 mi) long hiking path was arranged by the volunteers. It starts at the locality Vinogradi ("Vineyards"), situated at the entrance into the woods. It used to be an excursion area, on the vineyard slopes. There was also a restaurant at the location, abandoned and derelict by the 2020s.
