= Vukićevica =

- Village
- Interactive map of Vukićevica
- Coordinates: 44.5617°N 20.0417°E
- Country: Serbia
- Municipality: Obrenovac

Area
  - Total: 9.93 km^{2} (3.83 sq mi)
- Elevation: 118 m (387 ft)

Population (2011)
  - Total: 584
  - Density: 58.8/km^{2} (152/sq mi)
- Time zone: UTC+1 (CET)
  - Summer (DST): UTC+2 (CEST)

Vukićevica (Serbian: Вукићевица) is a village located in the municipality of Obrenovac, Belgrade, Serbia. As of 2011 census, it has a population of 584 inhabitants.

== Jasenje Neolithic site ==
In the locality of Jasenje, the remains of Neolithic site were explored in 1967 by Jovan Todorović, a curator of the Belgrade City Museum.

== 2018 toxic waste incident ==
Vukićevica made nationwide headlines in December 2017 when 22 to 25 tons of waste were found in the village, buried into the ground on the lot of the local entrepreneur Zoran Marković. Waste was packed in 89 tin barrels. Several days later, on a different lot, but also owned by the Marković family, additional 60 barrels and five plastic containers were discovered, being partially dug and scattered around. On the same day, in the village of Veliko Polje, west of Vukićevica, but also in the Obrenovac municipality, 18 tons of waste in 100 tin barrels were discovered in a warehouse. Environment minister Goran Trivan stated that the waste is extremely toxic and cancerous. The waste mostly consisted of industrial waste oil, remnants of the automobile tires and machine oils ("dirty" mazut). It contained benzole, benzene, trichloroethylene and toluene. Waste from the second find also contained cyclohexane and oleamide. Marković was arrested.

In February 2018 additional barrels, dug into the ground next to the village road, were discovered. At first there were 15 barrels, but later only in one day 28 barrels with 200 L (44 imp gal; 53 US gal) each, were taken from the ground and the digging continued. The lot belongs to father of the already arrested Marković. Minister Trivan invited citizens to report any information on similar locations throughout Serbia, as in the meantime, a hidden toxic waste was also discovered in town of Novi Sad. He asserted that probably an organized group is behind this, mixing the waste to make tracing of its origin difficult, and burying it all over the state. Experts confirmed that the waste is industrial, not originating in smaller, individual companies. On the third location the waste consisted of oils, lubricants, oily emulsions and coating and protective emulsifiers. None of the waste was radioactive. In 2018, Serbia still has no facilities for the treatment of the toxic waste. Additionally, two dozens of yellowish slabs, resembling the PU foam and mostly being polyurethane adhesives, were discovered in the neighboring field. In time, number of barrels on this second location grew to over 100, with over 40 tons of waste. This barrels were crushed and flattened into the ground, as if they were leveled with the road roller. In the process some of them cracked and the content leaked into the ground.

On 30 May 2018 it was announced that additional 60 tons of toxic waste were found in the village. The village earned a moniker "the best known village in Serbia by notoriety". In October 2018, Marković was sentenced to 4.5 years in prison and fined 600.000 dinars (5.000 €), while one of his cousins was also found guilty.
