= Ratari =

Ratari may refer to the following places in Serbia:

- Ratari (Obrenovac), a village in the municipality of Obrenovac, city of Belgrade
- Ratari (Smederevska Palanka), a village in the municipality of Smederevska Palanka
