= Belo Polje (Obrenovac) =

Belo Polje Бело Поље
- Village
- Interactive map of Belo Polje
- Coordinates: 44.6439°N 20.1981°E
- Country: Serbia
- Municipality: Obrenovac

Area
  - Total: 6.02 km^{2} (2.32 sq mi)
- Elevation: 77 m (253 ft)

Population (2011)
  - Total: 1,836
  - Density: 305/km^{2} (790/sq mi)
- Time zone: UTC+1 (CET)
  - Summer (DST): UTC+2 (CEST)

Belo Polje (Serbian: Бело Поље) is a village located in the municipality of Obrenovac, Belgrade, Serbia. As of 2011 census, it has a population of 1,836 inhabitants.

== Names ==
The name means "white field" coming from the words "belo/бело" meaning white, and "polje/поље" meaning field
