= Poljane (Obrenovac) =

Poljane Пољане
- Village
- Location within Serbia
- Coordinates: 44°32′N 20°14′E
- Country: Serbia
- Municipality: Obrenovac

Area
  - Total: 11.15 km^{2} (4.31 sq mi)
- Elevation: 81 m (266 ft)

Population (2011)
  - Total: 401
  - Density: 36.0/km^{2} (93.1/sq mi)
- Time zone: UTC+1 (CET)
  - Summer (DST): UTC+2 (CEST)

Poljane (Serbian: Пољане) is a village located in the municipality of Obrenovac, Belgrade, Serbia. As of 2011 census, it has a population of 401 inhabitants.
