= Dren (Obrenovac) =

Dren Дрен
- Village
- Location within Serbia
- Coordinates: 44°35′25″N 20°1′29″E
- Country: Serbia
- District: Belgrade
- Municipality: Obrenovac

Area
  - Total: 20.09 km^{2} (7.76 sq mi)

Population (2011)
  - Total: 1,113
  - Density: 55.40/km^{2} (143.5/sq mi)
- Time zone: UTC+1 (CET)
  - Summer (DST): UTC+2 (CEST)

Dren (Serbian: Дрен) is a village located in the municipality of Obrenovac, Belgrade, Serbia. As of 2011 census, it has a population of 1,113 inhabitants.

== Demographics ==
There are 993 adults living in the Dren settlement, and the average age of the population is 40.2 years (39.2 for men and 41.3 for women). There are 381 households in the settlement, and the average number of members per household is 3.36.

This settlement is mainly inhabited by romanii (according to the 2002 census), and in the last three censuses, a decrease in the number of inhabitants was observed.
