= Trstenica =

- Village
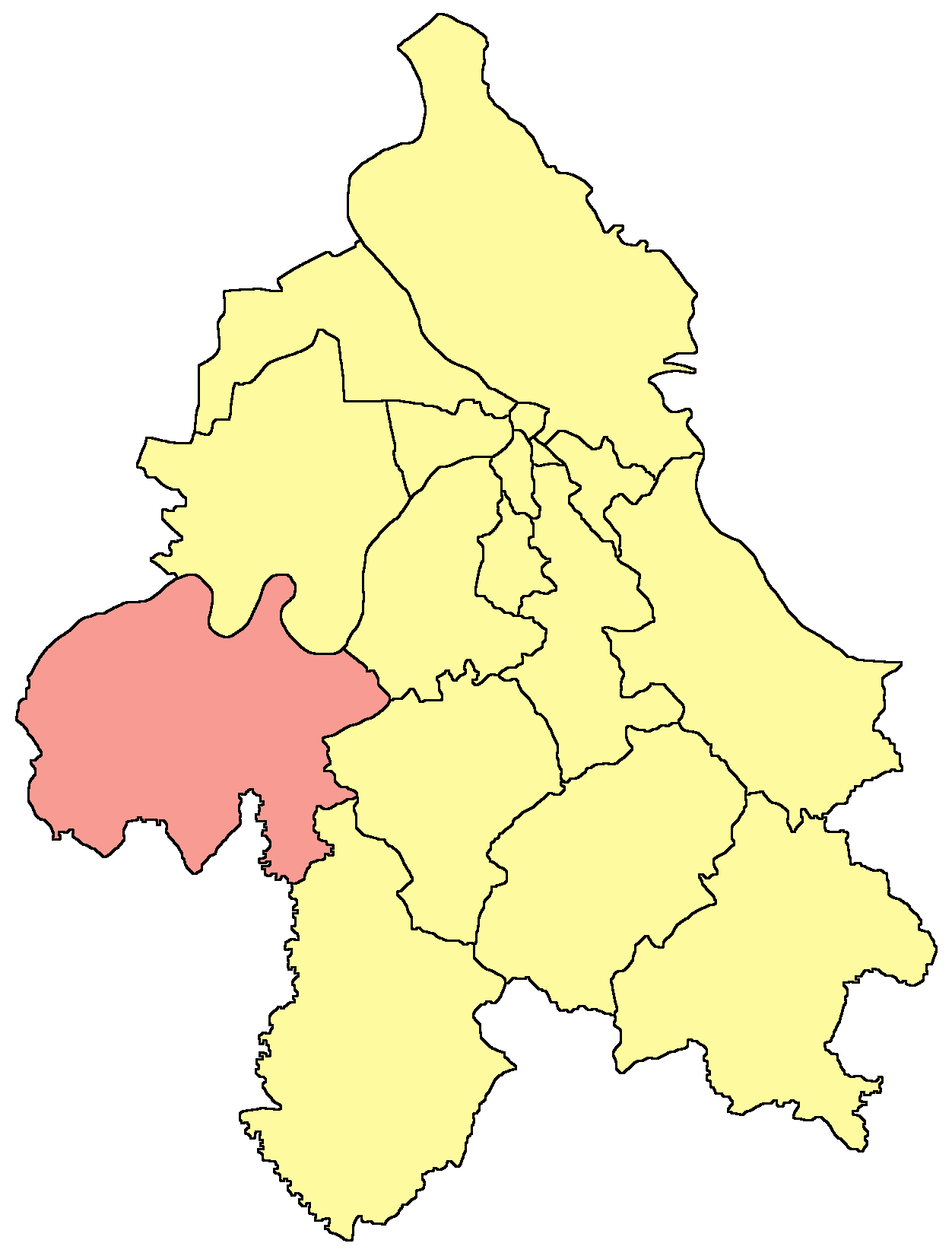
- Belgrade municipality map
- Interactive map of Trstenica
- Coordinates: 44.5581°N 20.1175°E
- Country: Serbia
- Municipality: Obrenovac

Area
  - Total: 15.51 km^{2} (5.99 sq mi)
- Elevation: 99 m (325 ft)

Population (2011)
  - Total: 792
  - Density: 51.1/km^{2} (132/sq mi)
- Time zone: UTC+1 (CET)
  - Summer (DST): UTC+2 (CEST)

Trstenica is a village located in the municipality of Obrenovac, Belgrade, Serbia. As of 2011 census, it has a population of 792 inhabitants.
