= Konatice =

- Village
- Interactive map of Konatice
- Coordinates: 44°33′25″N 20°15′04″E
- Country: Serbia
- Municipality: Obrenovac

Area
  - Total: 14.85 km^{2} (5.73 sq mi)
- Elevation: 173 m (568 ft)

Population (2011)
  - Total: 779
  - Density: 52.5/km^{2} (136/sq mi)
- Time zone: UTC+1 (CET)
  - Summer (DST): UTC+2 (CEST)

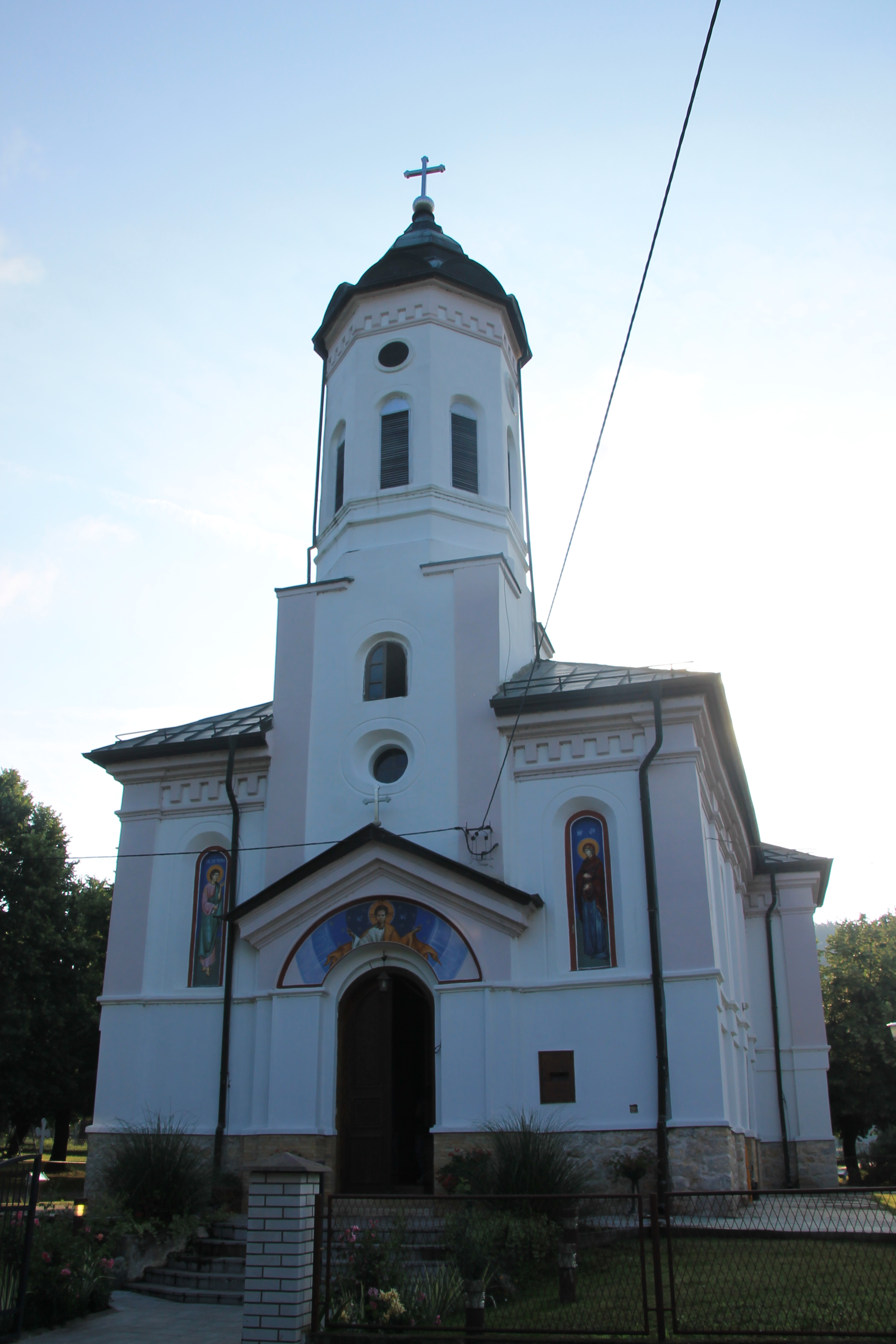

Konatice is a village located in the municipality of Obrenovac, Belgrade, Serbia. As of 2011 census, it has a population of 779 inhabitants.
