= Skela =

- Village
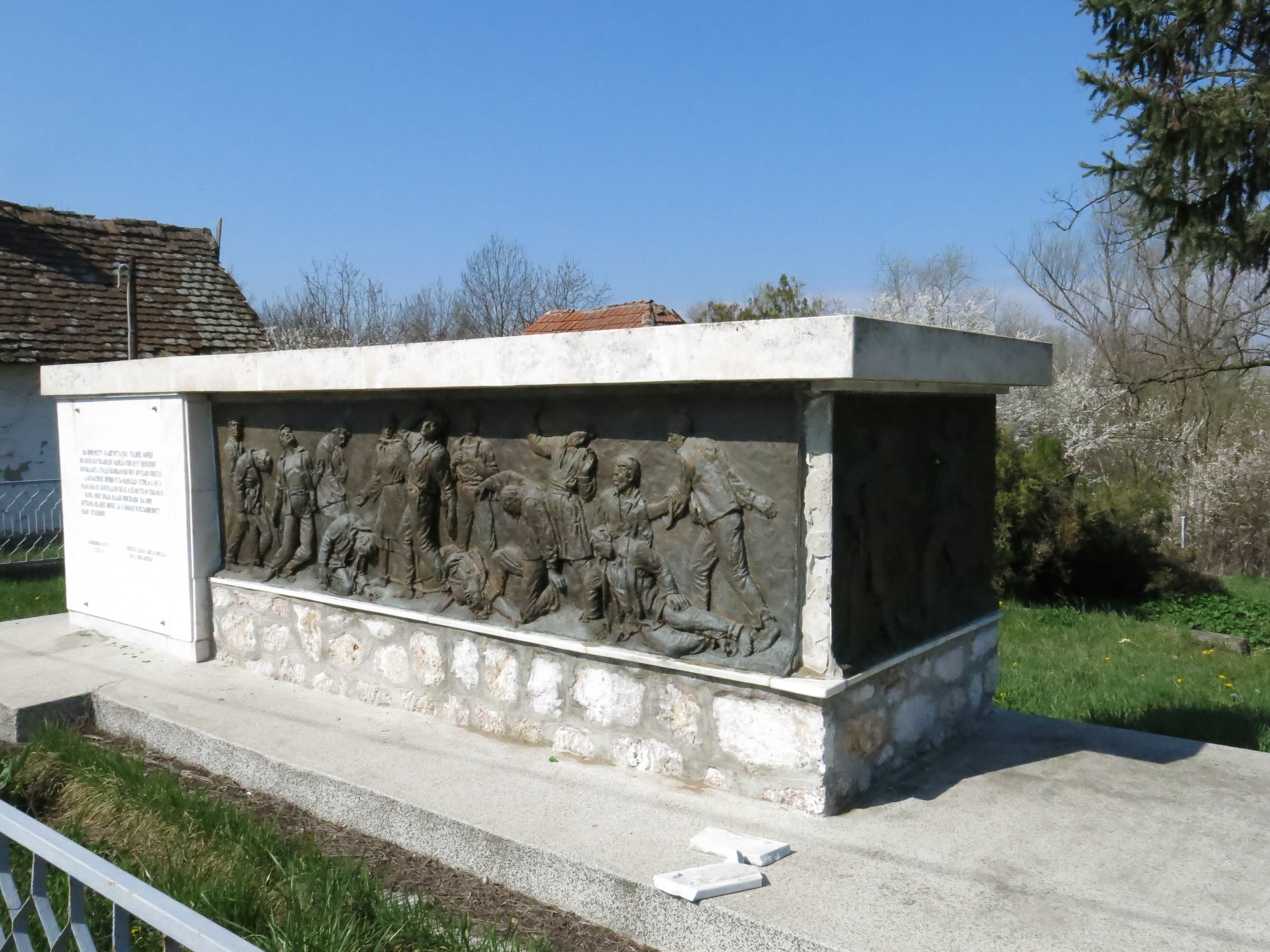
- A Monument to the executed hostages in Skella
- Interactive map of Skela
- Coordinates: 44°40′33″N 20°03′06″E
- Country: Serbia
- Municipality: Obrenovac

Area
  - Total: 25.91 km^{2} (10.00 sq mi)
- Elevation: 74 m (243 ft)

Population (2011)
  - Total: 1,858
  - Density: 71.71/km^{2} (185.7/sq mi)
- Time zone: UTC+1 (CET)
  - Summer (DST): UTC+2 (CEST)

Skela is a village located in the municipality of Obrenovac, Belgrade, Serbia. As of 2011 census, it has a population of 1,858 inhabitants.
