= Brgulice =

- Village
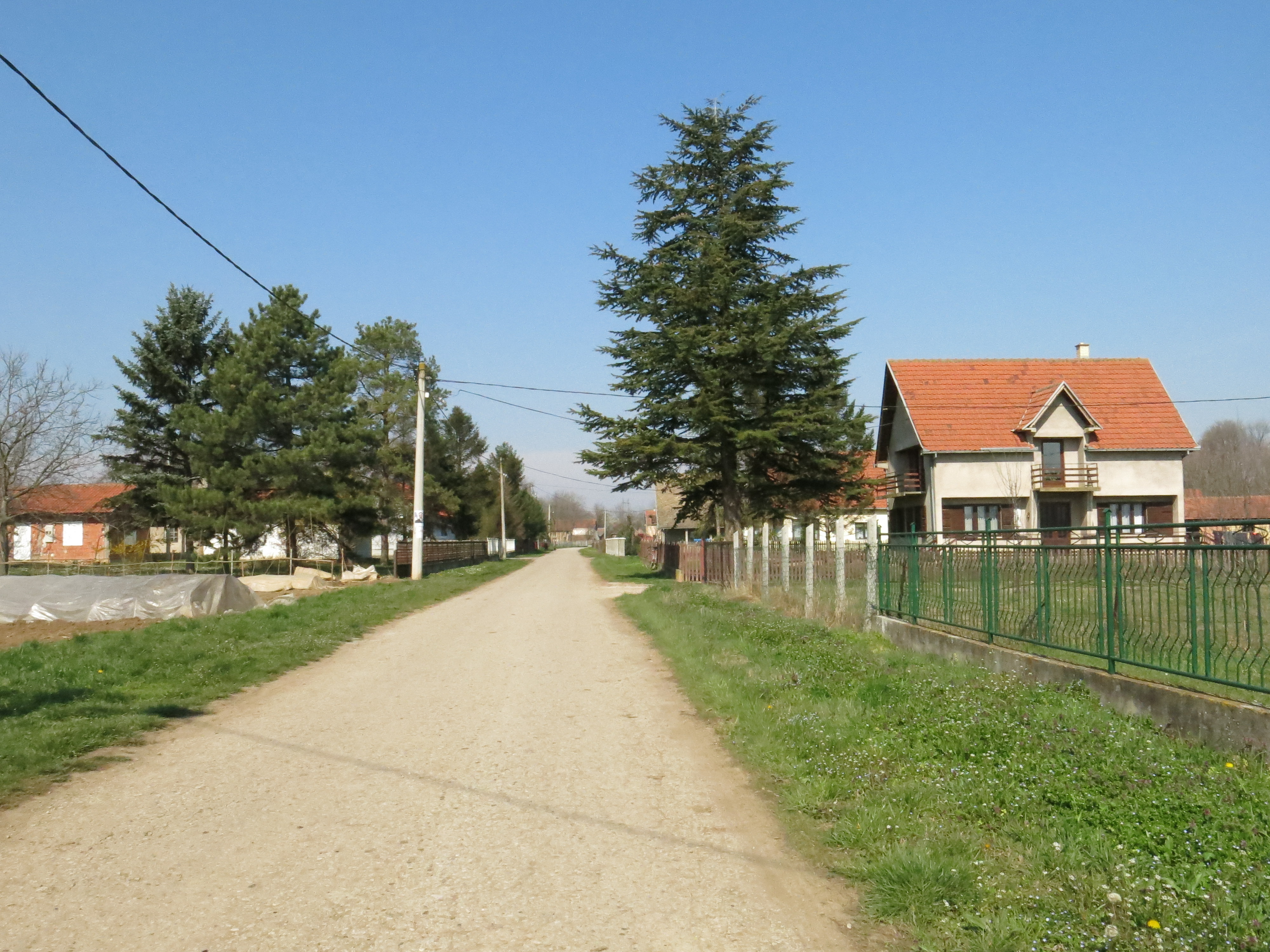
- Brgulice, Street

- Location in Serbia
- Coordinates: 44°39′52″N 20°07′00″E
- Country: Serbia
- District: Belgrade
- Municipality: Obrenovac

Area
  - Total: 3.31 km^{2} (1.28 sq mi)
- Elevation: 82 m (269 ft)

Population (2011)
  - Total: 490
  - Density: 150/km^{2} (380/sq mi)
- Time zone: UTC+1 (CET)
  - Summer (DST): UTC+2 (CEST)

Brgulice is a village located in the municipality of Obrenovac, Belgrade, Serbia. As of 2011 census, it has a population of 490 inhabitants.
