= Stubline transmitter =

Coordinates: 44°38′24″N 20°08′27″E

Stubline transmitter is a broadcasting facility for mediumwave and shortwave near Zvečka, Serbia. The mediumwave transmitter broadcast on 684 kHz and, until its destruction on May 30, 1999, it was one of the strongest in Europe having used 2000 kilowatts of power.

The station was rebuilt with a 225.5 metres tall mast, but nowadays uses less power.

== See also ==
- List of tallest structures in Serbia
