= Brović =

- Village
- Interactive map of Brović
- Coordinates: 44.5344°N 20.1381°E
- Country: Serbia
- Municipality: Obrenovac

Area
  - Total: 7.83 km^{2} (3.02 sq mi)
- Elevation: 77 m (253 ft)

Population (2011)
  - Total: 735
  - Density: 93.9/km^{2} (243/sq mi)
- Time zone: UTC+1 (CET)
  - Summer (DST): UTC+2 (CEST)

Brović (Serbian Cyrillic: Бровић) is a village located in the municipality of Obrenovac, Belgrade, Serbia. As of 2011 census, it has a population of 735 inhabitants.
