= Rvati (Obrenovac) =

- Village
- Interactive map of Rvati
- Coordinates: 44°39′34″N 20°11′40″E
- Country: Serbia
- Municipality: Obrenovac

Area
  - Total: 1.21 km^{2} (0.47 sq mi)
- Elevation: 71 m (233 ft)

Population (2011)
  - Total: 2,129
  - Density: 1,760/km^{2} (4,560/sq mi)
- Time zone: UTC+1 (CET)
  - Summer (DST): UTC+2 (CEST)

Rvati (Serbian: Рвати) is a village located in the municipality of Obrenovac, Belgrade, Serbia. As of 2011 census, it has a population of 2,129 inhabitants.
