= Zabrežje =

Zabrežje Забрежје
- Village
- Interactive map of Zabrežje
- Coordinates: 44°40′57″N 20°12′09″E
- Country: Serbia
- Municipality: Obrenovac

Area
  - Total: 12.46 km^{2} (4.81 sq mi)
- Elevation: 75 m (246 ft)

Population (2011)
  - Total: 2,371
  - Density: 190.3/km^{2} (492.8/sq mi)
- Time zone: UTC+1 (CET)
  - Summer (DST): UTC+2 (CEST)

Zabrežje (Serbian Cyrillic: Забрежје) is a village and the suburban settlement of Belgrade, the capital of Serbia. It is located in the municipality of Obrenovac and makes one urban unit with its municipal seat. Zabrežje was known as an important border settlement, in the 19th century, and a major transportation hub, including river port, in the first half of the 20th century.

== Location and geography ==
The settlement is located in the alluvial plain on the Sava's right bank, at an altitude of 75 m (246 ft). It is a semi-compacted settlement elongated along the roads. On the south it is fully grown with its municipal seat, Obrenovac, which is 2.5 km (1.6 mi) away. It consists of three neighborhoods (spatial-physical units): Grad, Brdo and Ružičići. Being part of urban Obrenovac area, it was included in the general urban plan of Obrenovac in 1996, becoming essentially a suburban settlement.

The village occupies the area of the large, peninsula-like meander of the Sava. Built up area of Zabrežje stretches in the east–west direction, spawning two opposite banks of the Sava, on the starting, and on the ending section of the meander, roughly from the Sava's 30th to the 40th kilometer. In the western section, the built up area continues to the south, reaching Obrenovac. North and south of the settlement are vast agricultural fields, including the areas and localities of Vič, Krčevine, Kruške, Babića Ćošak, Miljkovica, Plošće (north), Begluk, Ćelija, Tešnjak and Tamnava (south). Western area is called Grmik. Across the Sava, to the west, is the Syrmian sub-region of Crni Lug while to the north is the village of Boljevci, all in the Surčin municipality.

Area of the settlement is 12.46 km^{2} (4.81 sq mi). Locality Vić Bare has water springs. Earth embankment was built along the Sava's bank, stretching for 10 km (6.2 mi). In the southeastern extension, along the Sava's right bank is the main Obrenovac's excursion area, Zabran.

== Name ==
The toponym is derived from za- ("behind") and breg ("hill"), zabrežje meaning "area behind the hill". Looking from the southwest, the settlement is located behind the 80 m (260 ft)-high hill of Petlovo Brdo. It was formerly known as Zabrež.

== History ==
Zabrežje was mentioned for the first time in 1429.

First diplomatic letter in modern Serbia was written in the house of Pantelija Ružičić in Zabrežje, on 14 March 1804, during the First Serbian Uprising against the Ottoman rule. Archpriest Mateja Nenadović wrote and sent letters, among others, to Stefan Stratimirović, the Metropolitan of Karlovci. As the border settlement, since across the Sava was the territory of Austria-Hungary, the village in time a custom house, pier, railroad and port authority were built or established. There were two salt evaporation ponds in the village, one owned by the captain Miša Anastasijević and another by the Greek entrepreneur Kostas Salidis.

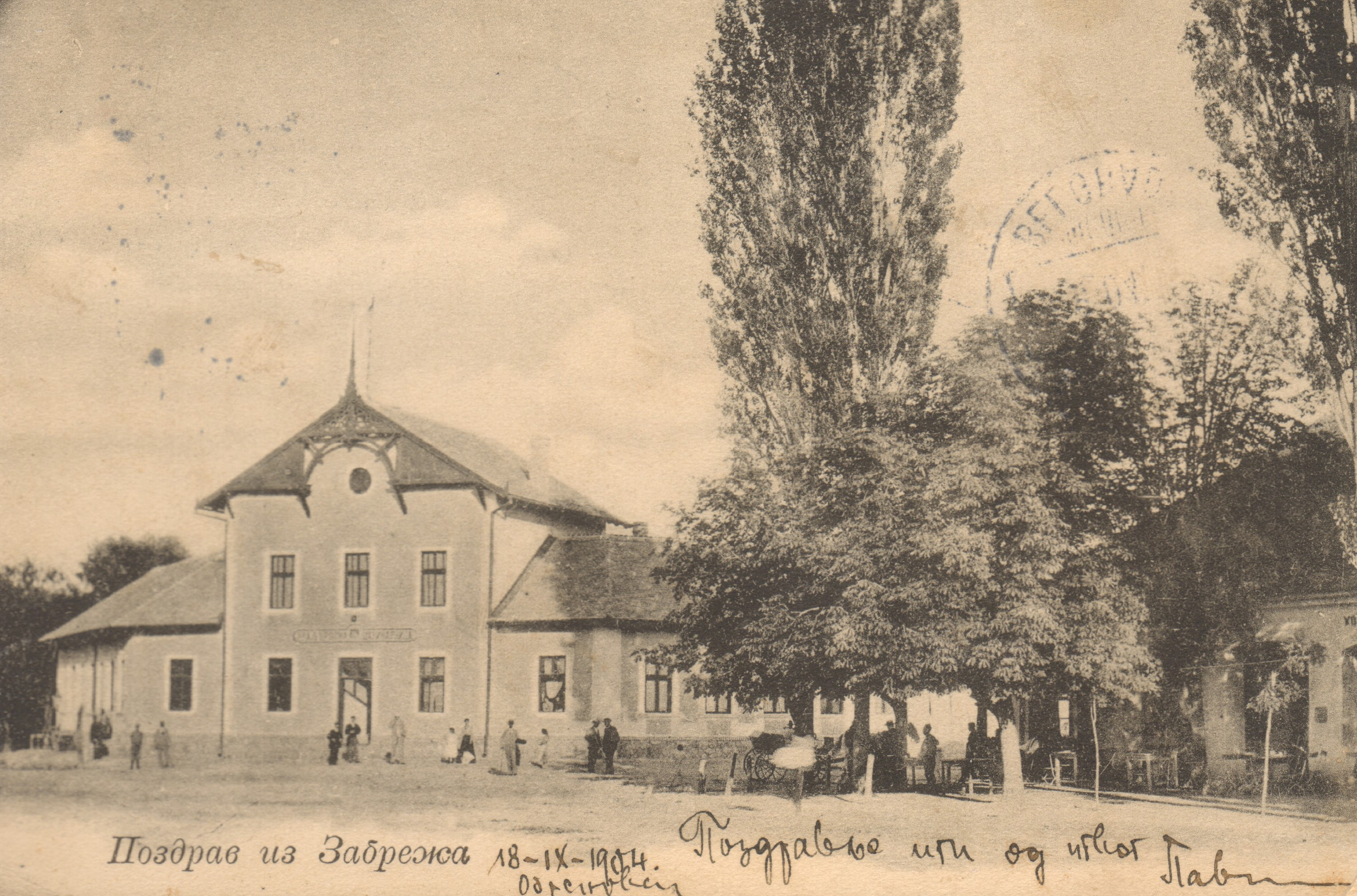
1904 postcaard from Zabrežje

From 1900 to 1955, Zabrežje was a major transportation hub. including river, railway and road traffic. Both the passenger and freight steamboats docked in the village's port, while there were regular ship lines to Belgrade, on the east, and Šabac, on the west, on every three hours. Steam train, popularly and generically called ćira in Serbia, connected Zabrežje with Herceg Novi on the Adriatic coast and Sarajevo and Mostar in Bosnia and Herzegovina, via Valjevo and Čačak. As there was no bridge across the Sava, the pier in Zabrežje was equipped with the slipway, to accommodate he ferry which transported the entire train composition. Across the river, ferry sailed to Boljevci where the train was placed on the tracks again and continued in the directions of Vienna and Budapest.

Thanks to the importance it had, many developments in Zabrežje surpassed those of an average or important village in Serbia. Though never grew much in terms of population (population of 2,000 reached only in the 1950s), the village had Zabreški grad, or Zabrežje Town, a commercial complex which included two hotels, and Workers Colony. It was visited by several heads of state, including emperor Franz Joseph I of Austria and king Alexander I of Yugoslavia. It has numerous grocery stores, craft shops (including candy production) and the local beer tradition. The Simović family owned the sawmill.

First theatrical show was held on 20 December 1910. The small, industrial power station within the Simović wood factory, became operational in 1923, on the location just 1 km (0.62 mi) away from the large, modern Nikola Tesla power plant (TENT). It powered the sawmill, grain mill, entire Workers Colony and majority of the village. In 1936, publishing of the only village newspapers in Serbia, Zabreške novine (Zabrežje's newspapers) started by the local teacher Čeda Mihajilović. It had a circulation of 1,000. It was discontinued after several numbers were published after World War II and unsuccessfully restared in the mid-2000s. First football match under the lights in Yugoslavia was held in Zabrežje, between the local team "Drvodeljac" and the FK Partizan from Belgrade, on 22 August 1948 in front of 2,000 spectators.

The village was connected to the power grid in 1946, to the waterworks in 1970 and the phone lines were introduced in 1983.

== Characteristics ==
Landmarks include the surviving customs house, known as the Ružičić House, originating from the 18th century Austrian occupation of the area. At the Gudurićka locality, there are remains of the Karađorđe's trench, and the village also has a monument dedicated to the National Liberation War, or the World War II. Protected objects are Grains Storage House, former spirits factory "Špirtulja", and the family Marković House from the second half of the 19th century.

The village has a junior-grades elementary school (branch of the "Posavski Partizani" school from Obrenovac), cultural center, cultural and artistic society "Dragan Marković", healthcare center and post office. Informative magazine "Naša Škola" used to be published. Village cemetery is located in the Begluk area.

== Economy ==
Historical population of Zabrežje
at censuses (left) / at present borders (right)

| Year | Pop. | ±% p.a. |
|---|---|---|
| 1921 | 1,367 | — |
| 1931 | 1,571 | +1.40% |
| 1948 | 1,943 | +1.26% |
| 1953 | 2,408 | +4.38% |
| 1961 | 2,909 | +2.39% |
| 1971 | 2,991 | +0.28% |
| 1981 | 3,109 | +0.39% |
| 1991 | 2,852 | −0.86% |
| 2002 | 2,663 | −0.62% |
| 2011 | 2,371 | −1.28% |

| Year | Pop. | ±% p.a. |
|---|---|---|
| 1921 | - | — |
| 1931 | - | — |
| 1948 | 567 | — |
| 1953 | 669 | +3.36% |
| 1961 | 968 | +4.73% |
| 1971 | 1,374 | +3.56% |
| 1981 | 1,718 | +2.26% |
| 1991 | 2,113 | +2.09% |
| 2002 | 2,228 | +0.48% |
| 2011 | 2,371 | +0.69% |

As a suburb to the highly industrialized Obrenovac, by 1991 only 5.7% of population worked in agriculture. State owned agricultural company "Dragan Marković" owned 250 ha (620 acres) of agricultural land in Zabrežje. Main products included wheat, corn and sugar beets. Individual farmers mostly produced wheat, corn, barley and fodder. There is a mill in the village, too.

At the locality Vić Bare, facilities of the Obrenovac's waterworks are located, including processing and purification of the water. There are large warehouses of companies "Bora Kečić", "Univerzal", etc.

== Demographics ==
The village is inhabited mainly by Serbs. First wave of migrants came in the 18th century from the Syrmia region, across the Sava, from Prizren and Pljevlja. Another wave of migrants followed in the first half of the 19th century, mostly from the regions of Bačka, Banat, Syrmia and Lika. Main family slavas are Đurđevdan, Feast of Saints Peter and Paul, Saint John the Baptist, Saint Nicholas Day, Saint Luke the Evangelist and Saints Cosmas and Damian (Sveti Vrači). Most observed preslava (secondary slava day) is the Easter Monday.

Before 2011 census, section of Zabrežje which completely grew in urban sense with Obrenovac, was detached and annexed to Obrenovac itself. Remaining part of the village appears to be growing in population numbers since 1921, while including the total former area of Zabrežje, it was depopulating since 1981.

By the 2011 census, the adult population was 2,142, and the average age was 40.5 years (39.1 for men and 41.8 for women). The village had 860 households, and the average number of persons per household was 3.10.
