= Orašac (Obrenovac) =

Orašac Орашац
- Village
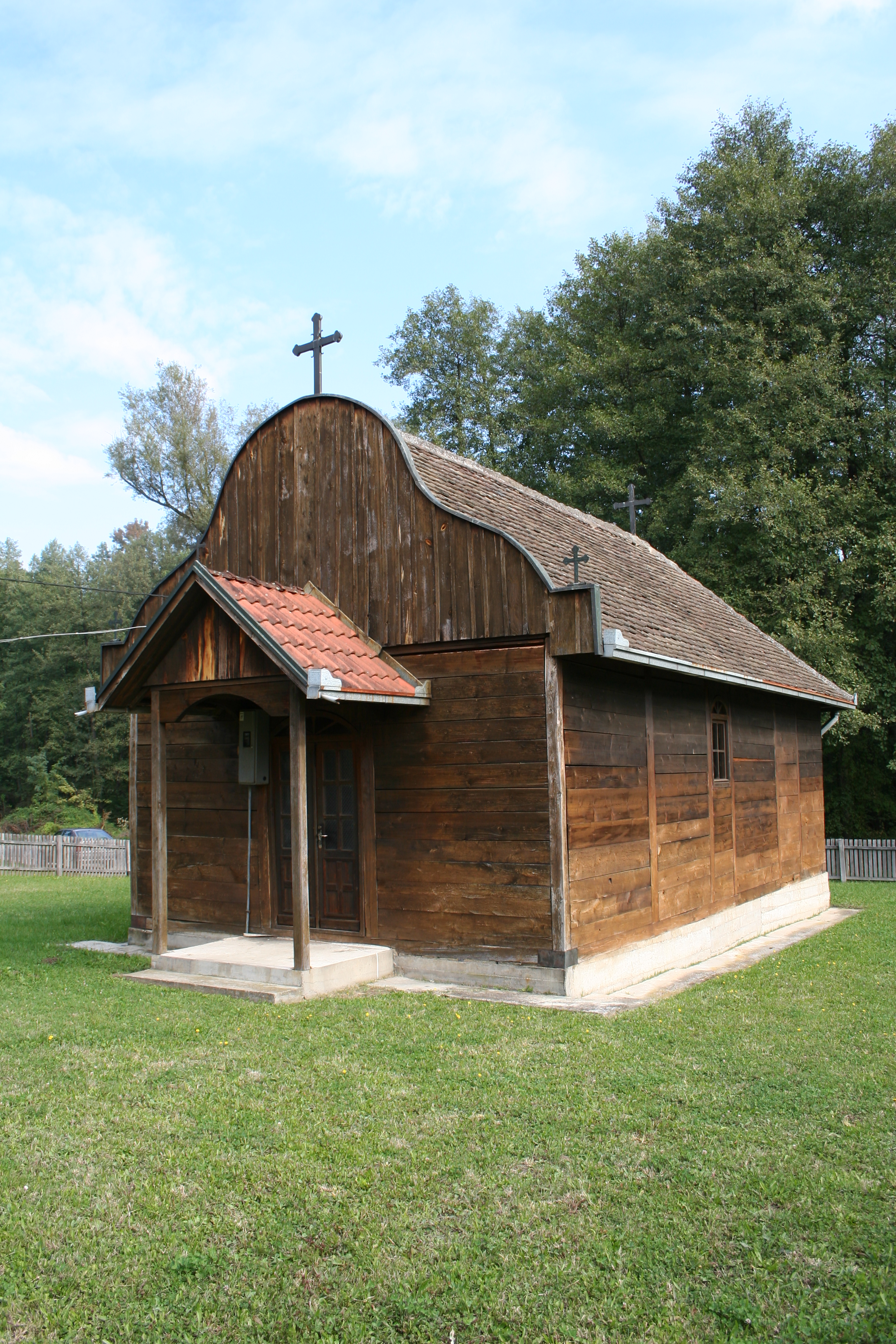
- Wooden church in Orašac
- Interactive map of Orašac
- Coordinates: 44.5853°N 20.0392°E
- Country: Serbia
- Municipality: Obrenovac

Area
  - Total: 13.09 km^{2} (5.05 sq mi)
- Elevation: 967 m (3,173 ft)

Population (2011)
  - Total: 603
  - Density: 46.1/km^{2} (119/sq mi)
- Time zone: UTC+1 (CET)
  - Summer (DST): UTC+2 (CEST)

Orašac (Serbian: Орашац) is a village located in the municipality of Obrenovac, Belgrade, Serbia. As of 2011 census, it has a population of 603 inhabitants.
