= Zoran Radojičić (Serbian politician, born 1975) =

Serbian politician

Zoran Radojičić (Serbian Cyrillic: Зоран Радојичић; born 1975) is a politician in Serbia. He was a member of the National Assembly of Serbia from 2016 to 2020, initially as a member of the right-wing Dveri party and subsequently as an independent.

== Early life and career ==
Radojičić was born in the Belgrade municipality of Obrenovac, in what was then the Socialist Republic of Serbia in the Socialist Federal Republic of Yugoslavia. He continues to reside in the municipality and works as a mechanical technician in private life.

== Politician ==
Prior to his expulsion, Radojičić was a member of Dveri's presidency and represented the party at international events. He was an international observer for the controversial 2014 referendum on the status of Crimea, which he described as well-organized and free of coercion. He took part in a Dveri delegation to the disputed Republic of Crimea the following year; Ukraine, which considers Crimea to be under its jurisdiction, responded by initiating criminal proceedings against Radojičić and the other delegates.

Radojičić received the eighth position on Dveri's electoral list in the 2012 Serbian parliamentary election. The list did not cross the electoral threshold to win representation in the assembly. He received the ninth position on a combined Dveri–Democratic Party of Serbia list in the 2016 election and was elected when the list won thirteen mandates. The election was won by the Serbian Progressive Party and its allies, and the Dveri members served in opposition.

During his time in parliament, Radojičić was a member of the defence and internal affairs committee; a deputy member of the committee on Kosovo and Metohija and the committee on spatial planning, transport, infrastructure, and telecommunications; a deputy member of a working group "for the collection of facts and evidence for the investigation of crimes committed against Serbs and other national communities" in Kosovo and Metohija; a member of Serbia's delegation to the Parliamentary Assembly of the Collective Security Treaty Organization (where Serbia has observer status); and a member of the parliamentary friendship groups with Belarus and Russia.

Radojičić was expelled from Dveri in early April 2019, on the charge that he had violated its policies by operating within a faction to take over the party. He was noted as a prominent ally of Srđan Nogo, who was also expelled from the party at around the same time.

Nogo and Radojičić both participated in the 2020 COVID-19 protests and riots in Serbia; these occurred against the backdrop of the 2020 parliamentary election, of which they supported a boycott. On 3 August 2020, when the new members of the Serbian Parliament were being sworn in, Nogo and Radojičić (who no longer had parliamentary immunity) were arrested and charged with inciting sedition under article 309 of the Criminal Code of Serbia.
