= Ljubinić =

- Village
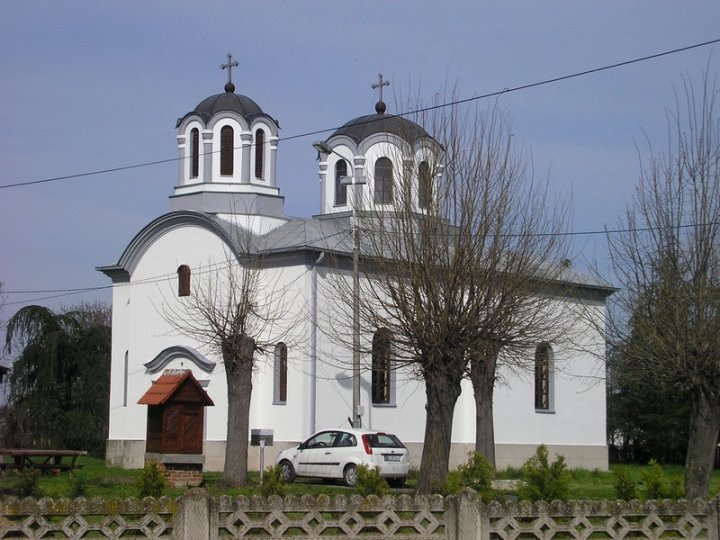
- Ljubinić orthodox church
- Interactive map of Ljubinić
- Coordinates: 44°32′17″N 20°03′19″E
- Country: Serbia
- Municipality: Obrenovac

Area
  - Total: 14.26 km^{2} (5.51 sq mi)
- Elevation: 125 m (410 ft)

Population (2011)
  - Total: 774
  - Density: 54.3/km^{2} (141/sq mi)
- Time zone: UTC+1 (CET)
  - Summer (DST): UTC+2 (CEST)
- Postal code: 11508

Ljubinić is a village located in the municipality of Obrenovac, Belgrade, Serbia. As of 2011 census, it has a population of 774 inhabitants.

The settlement has been mentioned since before the First Serbian Uprising, and one of the most important residents of this village is Prince Vasa Velimirović, who was a member of the ruling Soviet from 1805. In the village there is a church, dedicated to the Holy Great Martyr Dimitri, built in 1936, on the initiative of the then church board. The elder of the village that year was Svetislav Babić together with parish priest Siniša Jovanović, who proposed the construction of a church from the contributions of the faithful. For students from the first to the fourth grade, there is an advanced department of the "Grabovac" elementary school in the village.
