= Piroman =

Piroman Пироман
- Village
- Location of Piroman in Serbia
- Coordinates: 44°33′01″N 20°08′32″E
- Country: Serbia
- District: Belgrade
- Municipality: Obrenovac

Area
  - Total: 11.83 km^{2} (4.57 sq mi)
- Elevation: 82 m (269 ft)

Population (2011)
  - Total: 908
  - Density: 76.8/km^{2} (199/sq mi)
- Time zone: UTC+01:00 (CET)
  - Summer (DST): UTC+02:00 (CEST)

Piroman is a village located in the municipality of Obrenovac, Belgrade, Serbia. As of 2011 census, it has a population of 908 inhabitants.
