= Ušće (Obrenovac) =

Ušće Ушће
- Village
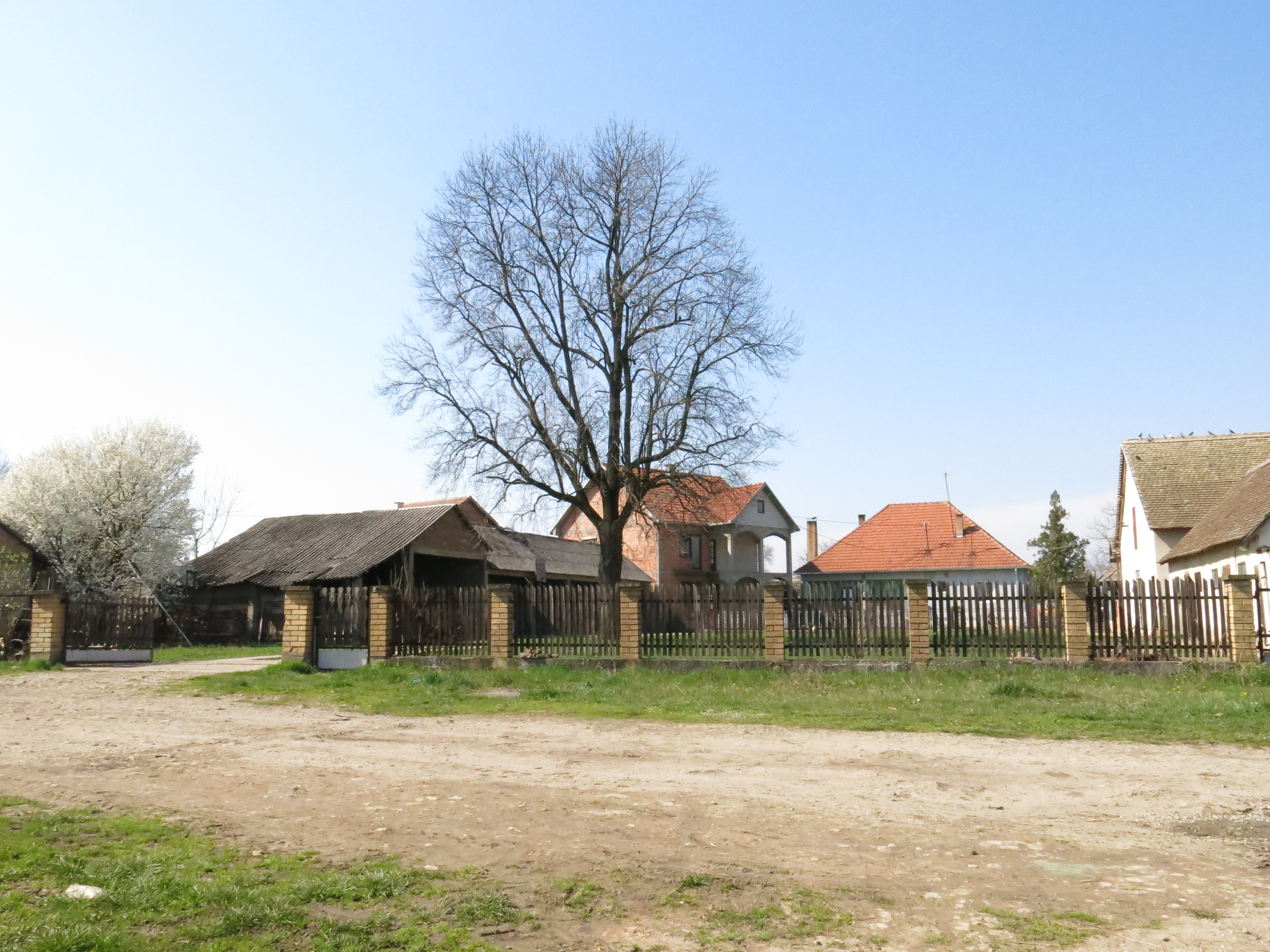
- Street of Ušće, Obrenovac
- Interactive map of Ušće
- Coordinates: 44.6317°N 20.0169°E
- Country: Serbia
- Municipality: Obrenovac

Area
  - Total: 21.41 km^{2} (8.27 sq mi)
- Elevation: 76 m (249 ft)

Population (2011)
  - Total: 1,119
  - Density: 52.27/km^{2} (135.4/sq mi)
- Time zone: UTC+1 (CET)
  - Summer (DST): UTC+2 (CEST)

Ušće (Serbian: Ушће) is a village located in the municipality of Obrenovac, Belgrade, Serbia. As of 2011 census, it has a population of 1,119 inhabitants.
