= Jasenak, Serbia =

Jasenak
- Village
- Interactive map of Jasenak
- Coordinates: 44°36′49″N 20°15′04″E
- Country: Serbia
- Municipality: Obrenovac

Area
  - Total: 11.21 km^{2} (4.33 sq mi)
- Elevation: 118 m (387 ft)

Population (2011)
  - Total: 670
  - Density: 60/km^{2} (150/sq mi)
- Time zone: UTC+1 (CET)
  - Summer (DST): UTC+2 (CEST)

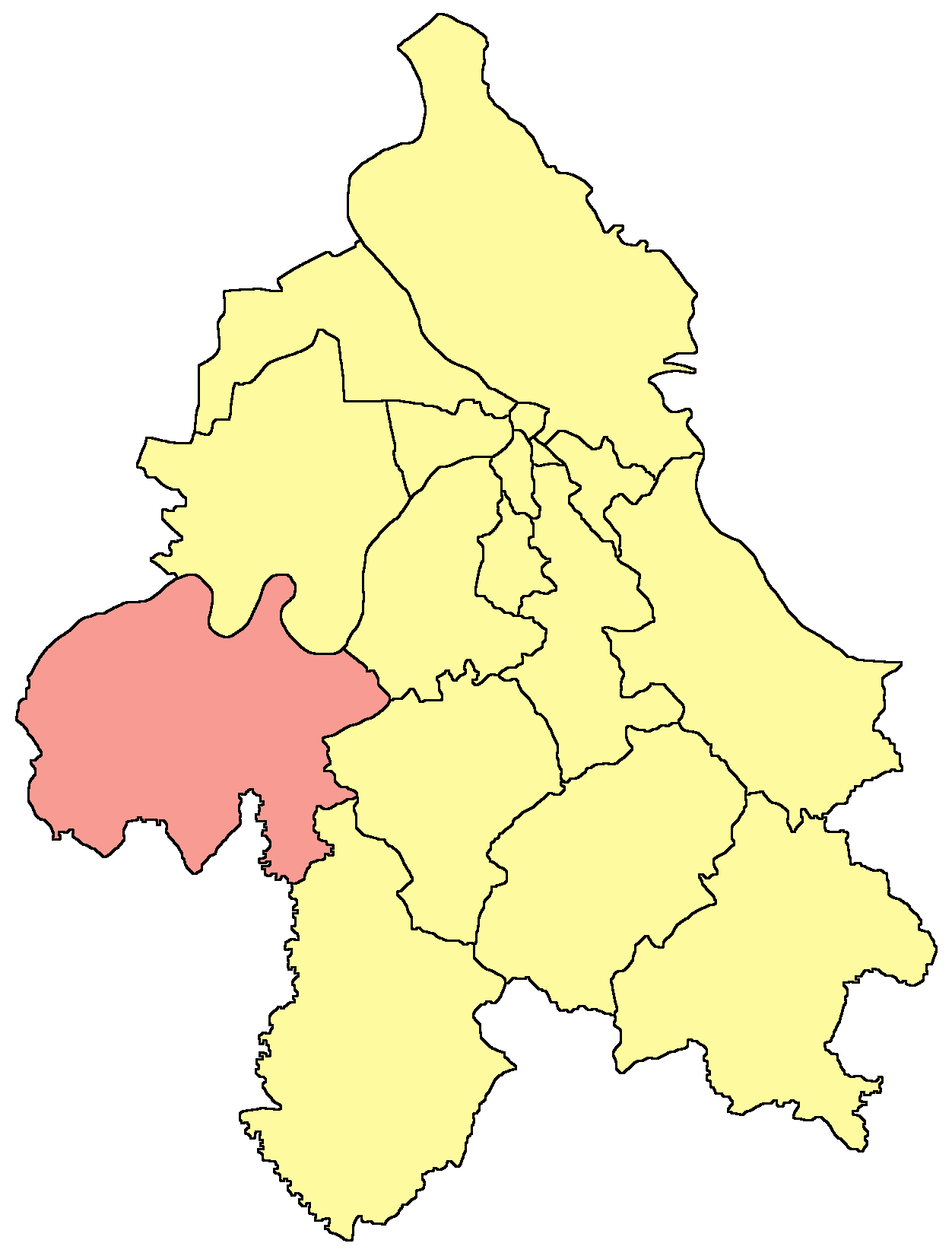
A map showing Obrenovac in Belgrade, the municipality in which Jasenak is located

Jasenak is a village located in the municipality of Obrenovac, Belgrade, Serbia. As of 2011 census, it has a population of 670 inhabitants.
