= Mislođin =

- Village
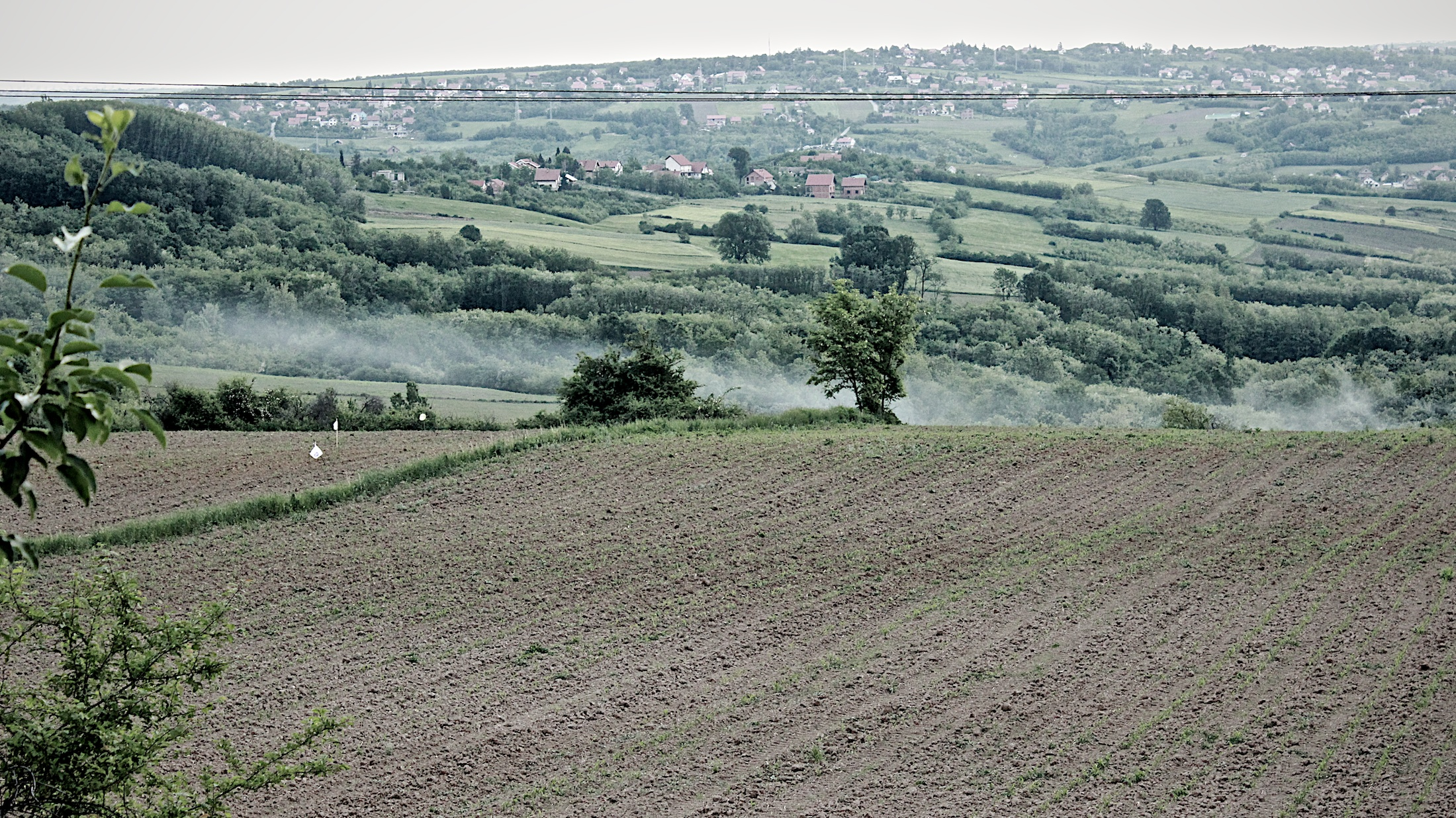
- Landscape of Mislođin

- Location within Serbia
- Coordinates: 44°37′34″N 20°13′36″E
- Country: Serbia
- Municipality: Obrenovac

Area
  - Total: 13.82 km^{2} (5.34 sq mi)
- Elevation: 173 m (568 ft)

Population (2011)
  - Total: 2,424
  - Density: 175.4/km^{2} (454.3/sq mi)
- Time zone: UTC+1 (CET)
  - Summer (DST): UTC+2 (CEST)

Mislođin is a village located in the municipality of Obrenovac, Belgrade, Serbia. As of 2022 census, it has a population of 2,302 inhabitants.

== History ==
The remains belonging to the Scordisci, a Celtic tribe which founded Singidunum and Taurunum, the predecessors of Belgrade and Zemun, respectively, were found in Mislođin.

It is also the location of the Monastery of Saint Christopher, founded in 1280.
