= Veliko Polje, Obrenovac =

Veliko Polje Велико Поље
- Village
- Interactive map of Veliko Polje
- Coordinates: 44°36′N 20°11′E
- Country: Serbia
- Municipality: Obrenovac

Area
  - Total: 23.41 km^{2} (9.04 sq mi)
- Elevation: 74 m (243 ft)

Population (2011)
  - Total: 1,868
  - Density: 79.79/km^{2} (206.7/sq mi)
- Time zone: UTC+1 (CET)
  - Summer (DST): UTC+2 (CEST)

Veliko Polje is a village located in the municipality of Obrenovac, Belgrade, Serbia. As of 2011 census, it has a population of 1,868 inhabitants.
