= Grabovac (Obrenovac) =

Grabovac Грабовац
- Village
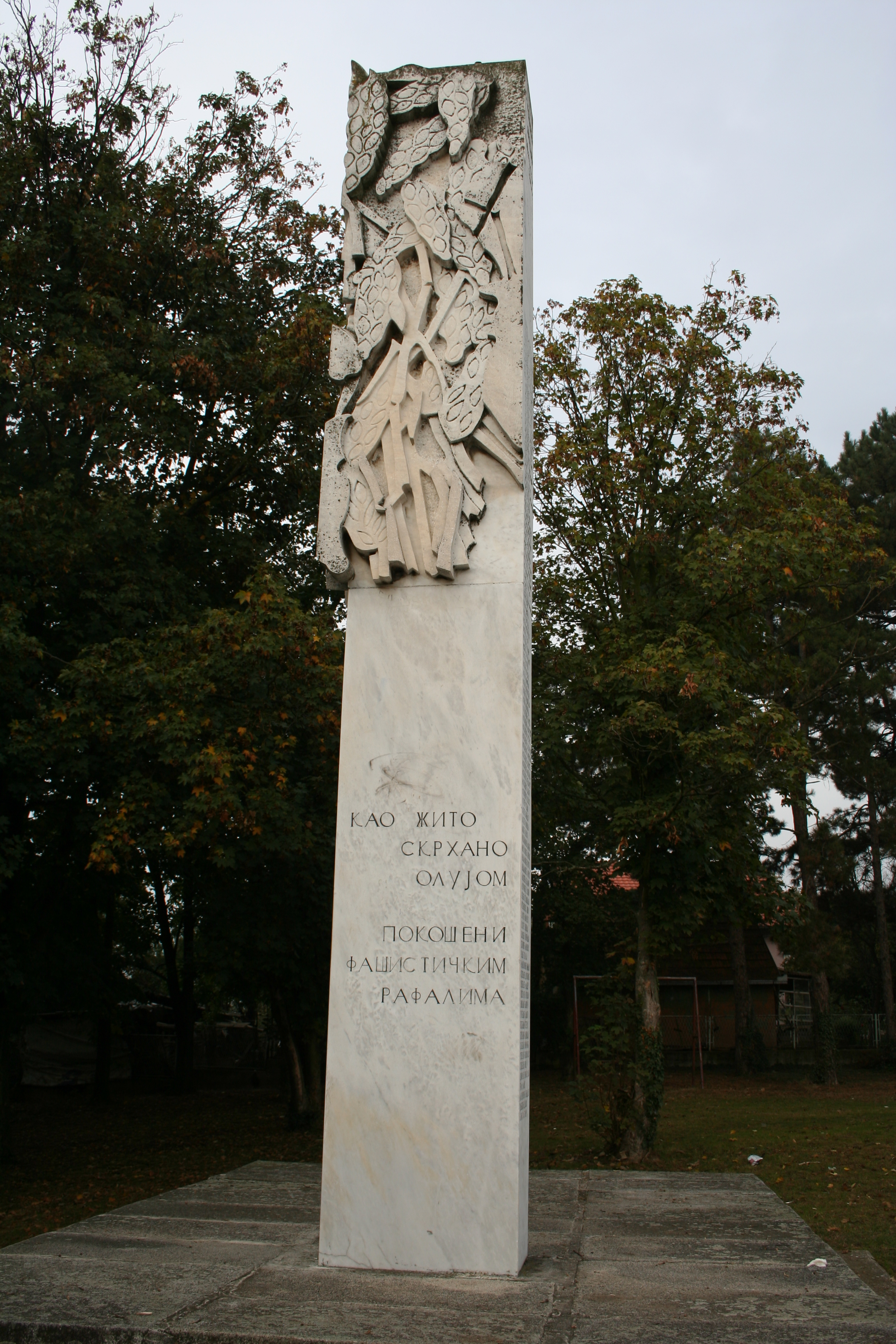
- Monument in honour of the executed inhabitants of Grabovac in 1941

- Location within Serbia
- Coordinates: 44.6014°N 20.1047°E
- Country: Serbia
- Municipality: Obrenovac

Area
  - Total: 34.24 km^{2} (13.22 sq mi)
- Elevation: 114 m (374 ft)

Population (2011)
  - Total: 2,401
  - Density: 70.12/km^{2} (181.6/sq mi)
- Time zone: UTC+1 (CET)
  - Summer (DST): UTC+2 (CEST)

Grabovac is a village located in the municipality of Obrenovac, Belgrade, Serbia. As of 2011 census, it has a population of 2,401 inhabitants.

Grabovac Monastery, founded in 14th century is located in the village. It was restored in 1859 and has a status of a cultural monument.
