= Barič =

Barič Барич
- Settlement
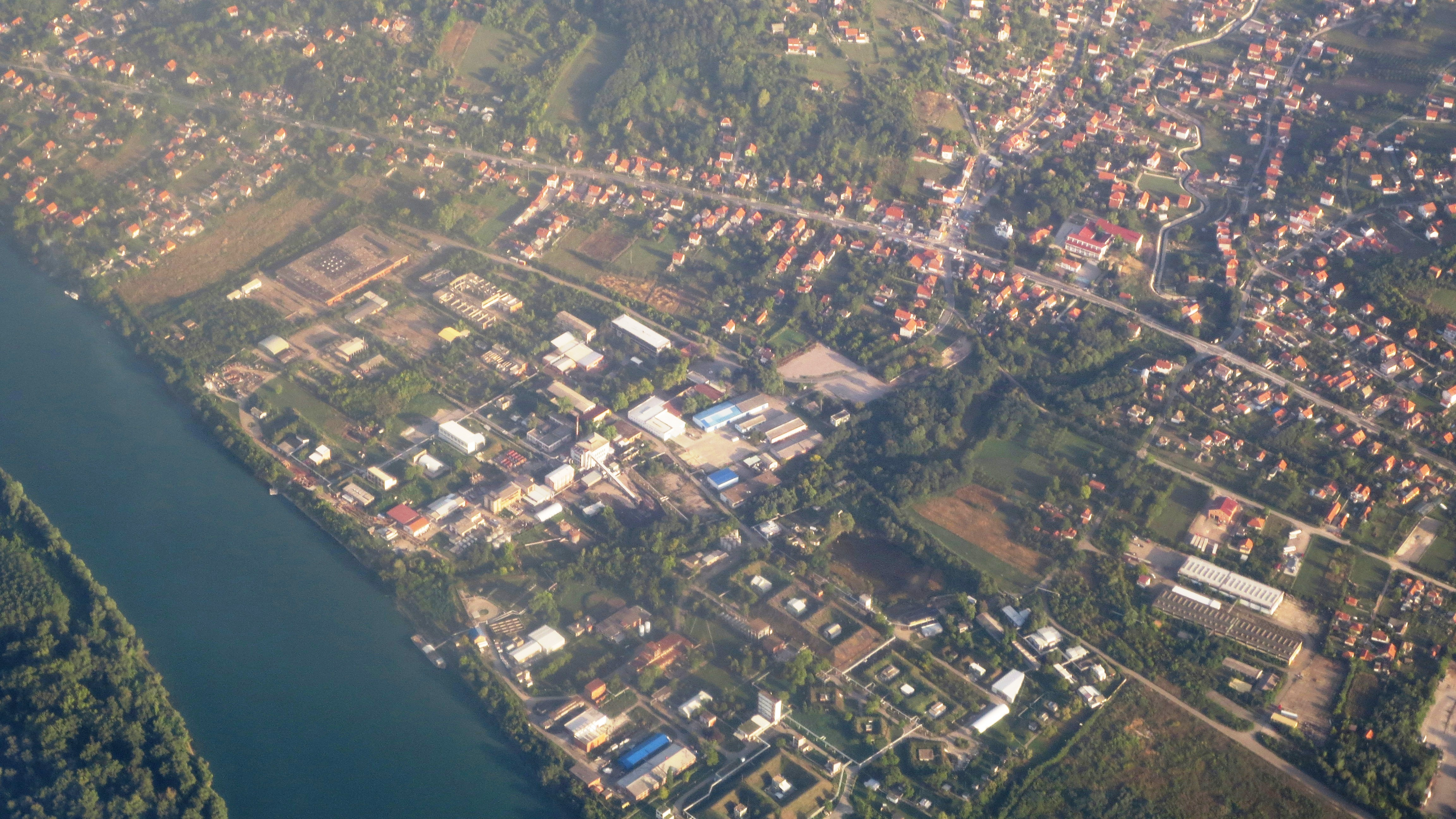
- Aerial view on Barič
- Interactive map of Barič
- Coordinates: 44°39′08″N 20°15′34″E
- Country: Serbia
- Municipality: Obrenovac

Area
  - Total: 14.69 km^{2} (5.67 sq mi)
- Elevation: 133 m (436 ft)

Population (2011)
  - Total: 6,918
  - Density: 470.9/km^{2} (1,220/sq mi)
- Time zone: UTC+1 (CET)
  - Summer (DST): UTC+2 (CEST)

Barič (Serbian: Барич) is a settlement located in the municipality of Obrenovac, Belgrade, Serbia. As of 2011 census, it has a population of 6,918 inhabitants.

== History ==
The remains belonging to the Scordisci, a Celtic tribe which founded Singidunum and Taurunum, the predecessors of Belgrade and Zemun, respectively, were found in Barič.
