= Obrenovac =

Obrenovac Обреновац (Serbian)
- Municipality
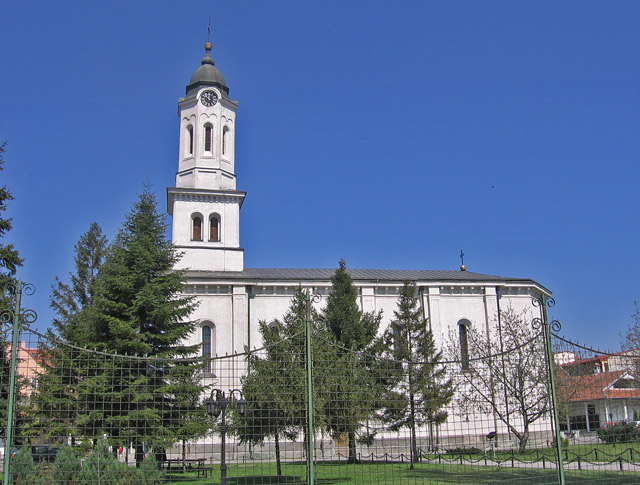
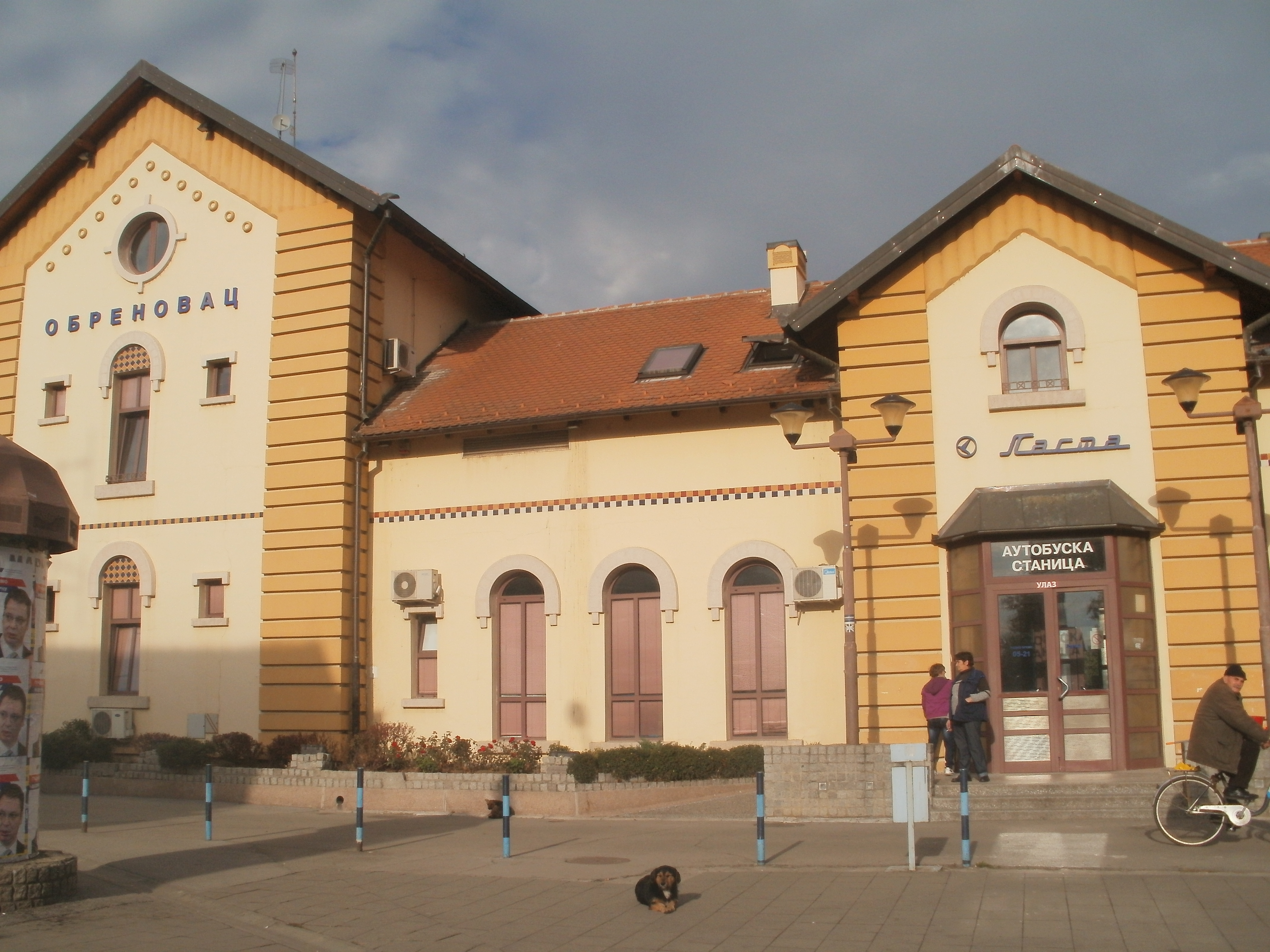
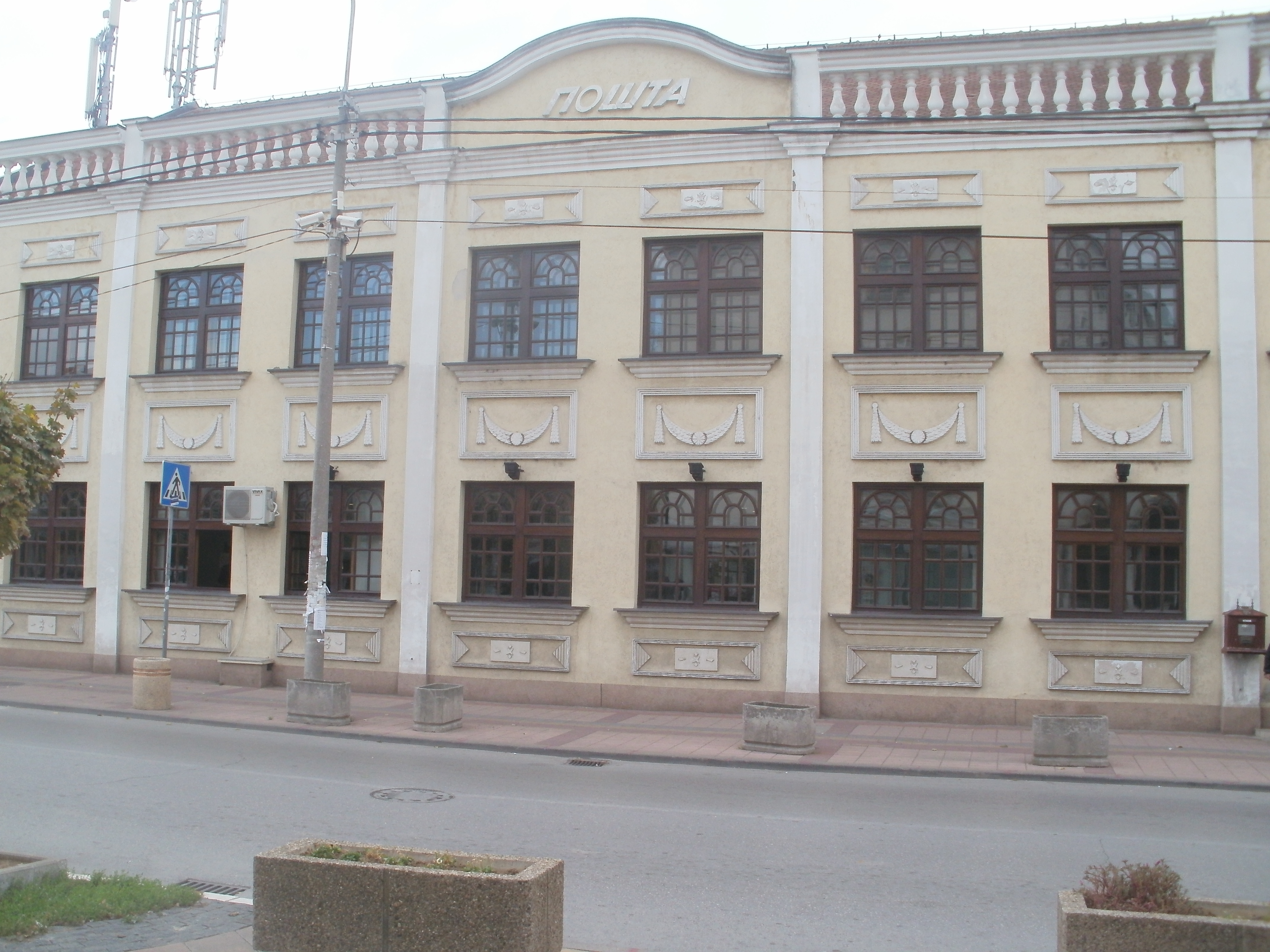
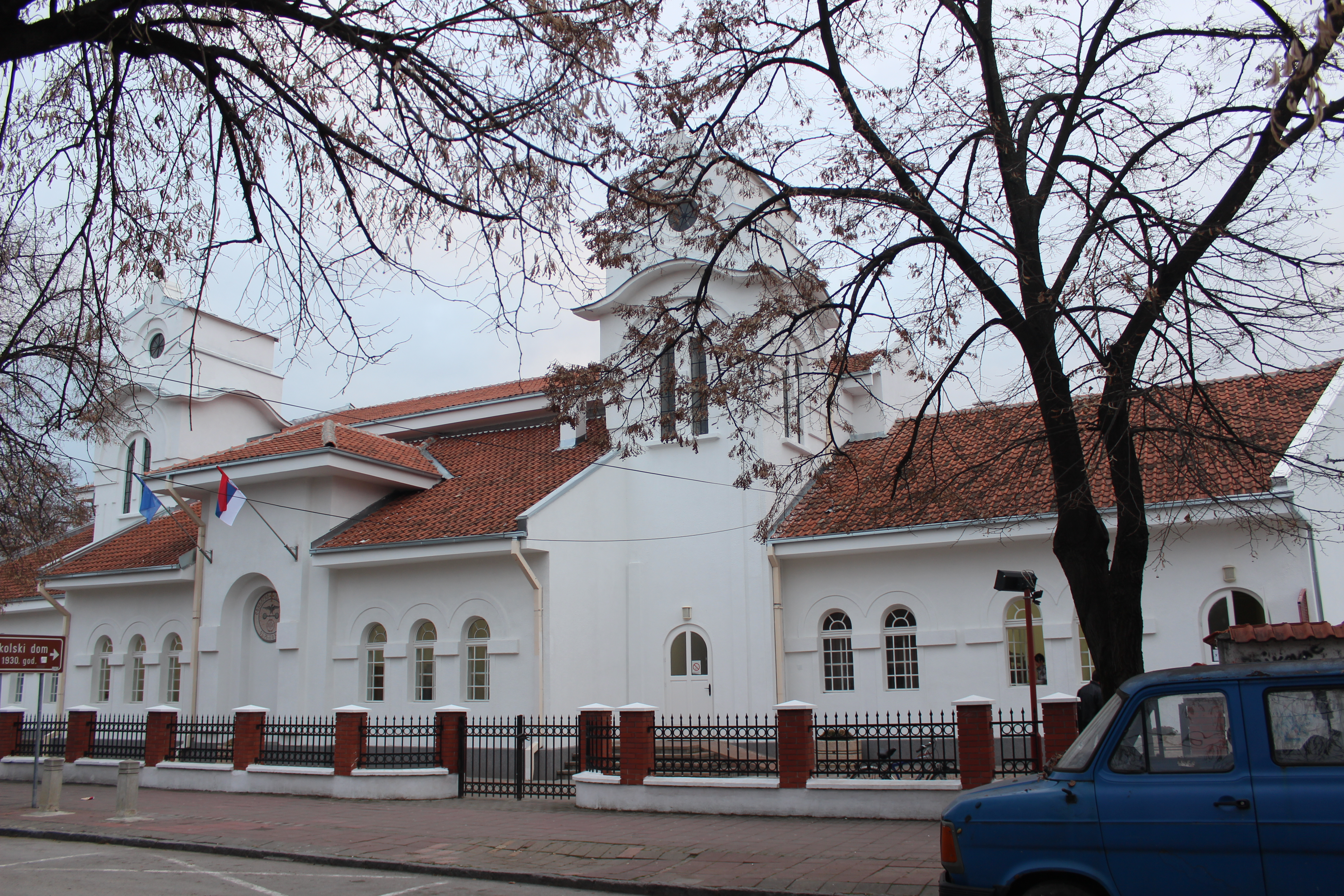
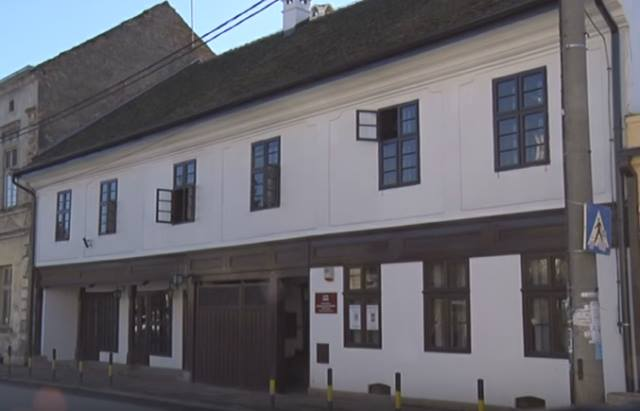
- Clockwise from top: Obrenovac orthodox church, the main bus station, the main post building, the Fallen Heroes Home, and Vlad Aksentijević Library

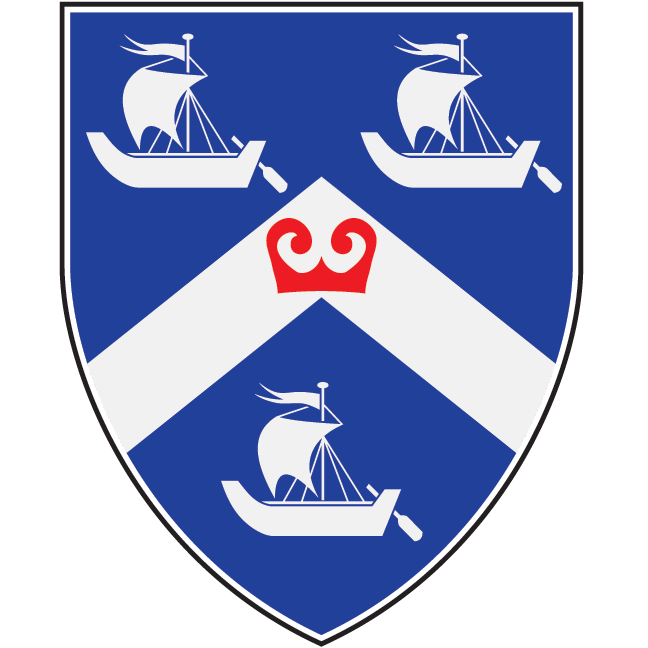
- Coat of arms

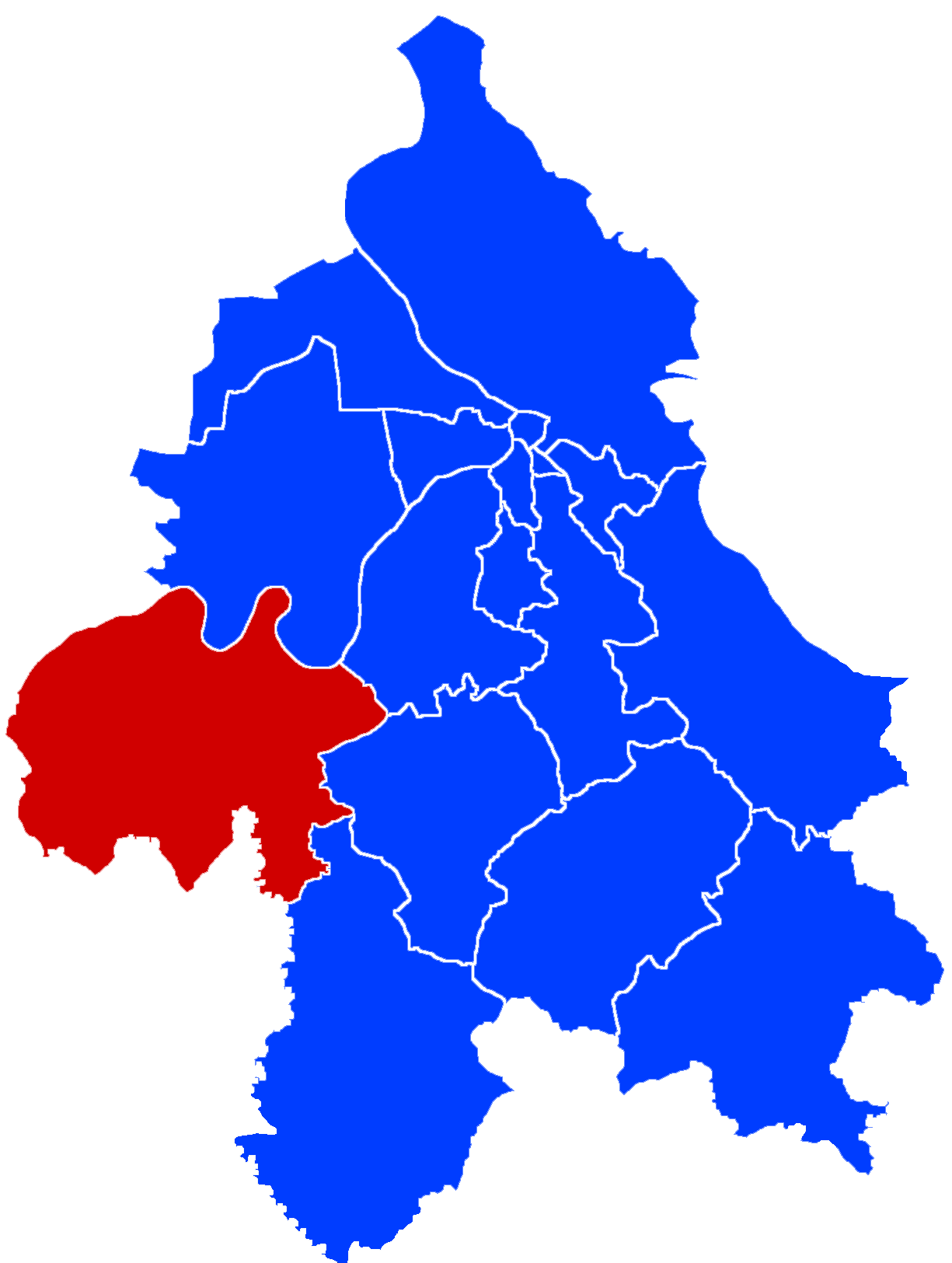
- Location of Obrenovac within the city of Belgrade
- Coordinates: 44°39′N 20°12′E
- Country: Serbia
- District: Belgrade
- Settlements: 29

Government
  - Mayor: Milorad Grčić (SNS)

Area
  - Urban: 9.47 km^{2} (3.66 sq mi)
  - Municipality: 409.83 km^{2} (158.24 sq mi)

Population (2022 census)
  - Urban: 25,380
  - Urban density: 2,680/km^{2} (6,940/sq mi)
  - Municipality: 68,882
  - Municipality density: 168.07/km^{2} (435.31/sq mi)
- Time zone: UTC+1 (CET)
  - Summer (DST): UTC+2 (CEST)
- Postal code: 11500
- Area code: +381 11
- Car plates: BG
- Website: www.obrenovac.rs

Obrenovac (Serbian Cyrillic: Обреновац, pronounced [obrěːnoʋat͡s]) is a municipality of the city of Belgrade. According to the 2022 census results, the municipality has a population of 68,882 inhabitants, while the urban area has 25,380 inhabitants. The old name for Obrenovac was Palež.

The largest Serbian thermal power plant, TPP Nikola Tesla, is located on the outskirts of the municipality. Stubline transmitter, one of the most powerful broadcasting stations ever built, is also situated in this municipality.

Obrenovac was submerged and completely evacuated during the 2014 Southeast Europe floods.

== Geography ==
Obrenovac is situated 30 km south-west of central Belgrade near bends of the river Sava to the north. The river Kolubara flows to the east of the town on its way to join the Sava.

Total land area of the municipality of Obrenovac is 411 km^{2} (159 sq mi). Apart from the town, it consists of the following villages:

- Baljevac
- Barič
- Belo Polje
- Brgulice
- Brović
- Draževac
- Dren
- Grabovac
- Jasenak
- Konatice
- Krtinska
- Ljubinić
- Mala Moštanica
- Mislođin
- Orašac
- Piroman
- Poljane
- Ratari
- Rvati
- Skela
- Stubline
- Trstenica
- Urovci
- Ušće
- Veliko Polje
- Vukićevica
- Zabrežje
- Zvečka

Some of the neighborhoods in the town are Topolice, Rojkovac, Dudovi, Rvati, Muzička kolonija, Sljivice, Belo polje, Gaj, and Stočnjak.

== History ==
In the Middle Ages, the area was part of Serbian states. King of Srem Dragutin Nemanjić ruled it between 1282 and 1319, and established monasteries in Grabovac and Mislođin. In 1521, it was conquered by the Ottoman Empire, who ruled it for the next 300 years. Subsequently, it was site of numerous battles in frequent Ottoman–Habsburg wars and often changed hands. Austrian Regent of Serbia Charles Alexander, Duke of Württemberg built a summer house in nearby village of Stubline (then Neudorf). During a period of Austrian rule, between 1688. and 1717, the town was called Zweibrücken ('two bridges'), and during the Turkish rule it was called Palež ('arson'), possibly as a reference to frequent looting and fires it was subjected to.

On 11 April 1815, during the Second Serbian Uprising, the town was burned to the ground by Serbian forces in a battle against Ottomans. It was restored in 1859 by prince of Serbia Miloš Obrenović, after whom it was named. Church of the Holy Spirit was built in Obrenovac in 1870 and has a status of a protected cultural monument.

The Day of the Municipality is December 20, the date of the decree of Prince Miloš Obrenović by which the name of Obrenovac was instituted, and its patron day is the Holy Trinity.

The Municipality of Obrenovac was incorporated within community of Belgrade municipalities in 1957.

Obrenovac was Serbian town which suffered the greatest damage by the unprecedented floods in May 2014. Most of the population has been evacuated to safety. Sudden surge of water from Kolubara river on May 15 devastated the town, killing at least 14 persons, with several persons still missing.

== Demographics ==
Historical population
Year	Pop.	±% p.a.
1948	41,024	—
1953	44,484	+1.63%
1961	48,288	+1.03%
1971	53,260	+0.98%
1981	62,612	+1.63%
1991	70,234	+1.16%
2002	70,975	+0.10%
2011	72,524	+0.24%
2022	68,882	−0.47%

According to the 2022 census results, the municipality of Obrenovac has a population of 68,882 inhabitants.

=== Ethnic groups ===
The ethnic composition of the municipality:

Ethnic group	Population
Serbs	62,401
Romani	1,426
Yugoslavs	126
Montenegrins	119
Macedonians	81
Croats	76
Russians	53
Bulgarians	42
Hungarians	25
Albanians	24
Muslims	19
Others	1,040
Unknown	3,450
Total	68,882

== Economy ==
The largest Serbian thermal power plant TPP Nikola Tesla is located on the outskirts of the town; its chimney is widely visible as the surrounding area is generally flat.

Stubline transmitter was until the air-raids in 1999 one of the most powerful broadcasting transmitters in the world capable of broadcasting with 2 MW.

Touristic facilities include the Zabran forest on the right bank of the Sava. It is located outside of the urban zone of Obrenovac, northeast of the town and west of the Kolubara's mouth into the Sava. It is also accessible by boat as it has a peer. The forest has a 1.5 km (0.93 mi) long trim trails and arranged excursion sites. The pathways and bicycle path connect Zabran and the beach Perilo on the Sava. Under the name Obrenovački Zabran, the area is protected as the natural monument. The forest is one of the rare remaining autochthonous high forests in the floodplains of the Sava and Kolubara river. It influences the microclimate and mitigates the bad aftermaths of the Obrenovac's high level of industrialization.

The area was protected on 29 November 2013 and covers 47.77 ha (118.0 acres) and is separated from Sava by the embankment (dolma) with promenade. Present forests developed after the area was cut clean in 1941 and 1942, and are mostly short-lived sprout forests of low quality. More quality groves of pedunculate oak and narrow-leafed ash, once omnipresent and dominant in the entire Sava valley, are preserved for its genetic importance. Also dwindling is the presence of other species of higher quality, like silver poplar, grey poplar, European white elm, field elm and European wild pear. Autochthonous species are threatened by the later introduced and fast spreading species, like American ash, Canadian poplar, box elder, common milkweed, common ragweed, annual fleabane and, especially invasive, desert false indigo. They are gradually being replaced with the older species.

Not far from the Zabran is the hotel "Obrenovac", located at the entry into the town from the Belgrade direction. The hotel has thermal springs, outdoor and indoor Olympic swimming pools, aqua park and sports complex. The spa with sulfuric water is active since c.1900. Two wells were drilled in the 1930s, one kilometer apart, both reaching the same spring at the depth of 469 m (1,539 ft). One well was arranged as a spa, while the other was an unregulated water well called Cevka ("small pipe"), even used by the local farmers for their cattle. In 2017–2018 Cevka was urbanized and arranged as a proper spa, too, with pools. Spas, hotel, and health care center form one health and touristic complex spreading on 20 ha (49 acres). Water is not for human consumption and has a temperature of 21 to 22 °C (70 to 72 °F).

In the village of Skela, in the western section of the municipality, there is a popular attraction of ethno-yard which includes the mini-zoo. Other green areas include another protected natural monument, "Group of pedunculate oaks at Jozić cabin", which are over 200 years old, Arboretum with exotic and autochthonous plants, and the Natural History Home. There is also a game hunting ground "Posavina" in the municipality.

On the location of the old landfill along the Kolubara river, an arboretum was planted on 1.4 ha (3.5 acres). It contains over 600 plants from 40 deciduous and 20 coniferous species, both autochthonous and allochthonous (China, Japan, Korea, America), including an orchard with old, Serbian varieties. Species include paulownia, metasequoia, larch, taxodium, liquidambar, koelreuteria, sweet maple, poplar, willow, ash and oak. The arboretum was destroyed during the 2014 floods and was replanted. A Natural Exhibition Home was built, with several permanent exhibitions, including one on moths and butterflies, and the canal with a small bridge was dug. The orchard contains chestnut, almond, medlar, old varieties of apples (kolačara, budimka) and pears (karamanka).

There is a green market in the centre of the town, and also flea market (as of August 2006) to the south of the town on the Valjevo road. The most famous football club from Obrenovac is FK Radnički Obrenovac; its stadium is beside the Belgrade road. The oldest school in the town is found next to Topolice. It carries the name of Jovan Popović. The school was built by Miloš Obrenović.

The following table gives a preview of total number of registered people employed in legal entities per their core activity (as of 2022):

Activity	Total
Agriculture, forestry and fishing	22
Mining and quarrying	9
Manufacturing	4,782
Electricity, gas, steam and air conditioning supply	1,980
Water supply; sewerage, waste management and remediation activities	438
Construction	929
Wholesale and retail trade, repair of motor vehicles and motorcycles	2,473
Transportation and storage	1,275
Accommodation and food services	582
Information and communication	169
Financial and insurance activities	223
Real estate activities	31
Professional, scientific and technical activities	446
Administrative and support service activities	7,400
Public administration and defense; compulsory social security	573
Education	978
Human health and social work activities	1,042
Arts, entertainment and recreation	252
Other service activities	268
Individual agricultural workers	405
Total	24,178

== Education ==
The first elementary school in Obrenovac was established in 1824 and is one of the oldest schools in Serbia. Now there are 10 elementary schools in the municipality, as well as the Gymansium (established in 1922), Technical High School, and Agricultural High School.

== Sports ==
Local football club Radnički (Workers) has competed in the First League of Serbia and Montenegro, the country's top tier at the time, between 2002 and 2004.

== Public transport ==
Three bus lines connect Obrenovac with Belgrade: 860, 860E and 861A.

== International cooperation ==
Obrenovac is twinned with the following cities and municipalities:

- Kumanovo, North Macedonia
- Staré Mesto, Slovakia
- Bergen, Norway

== Notable people ==
- Vladan Batić, former Minister of Justice
- Zoran Radojičić, former member of the National Assembly of Serbia
- Milan Stanković

== See also ==
- List of cities in Serbia
- Obrenović Dynasty (Serbian Kings)
- Subdivisions of Belgrade
- List of Belgrade neighborhoods and suburbs
