= Krtinska =

- Village
- Interactive map of Krtinska
- Coordinates: 44°40′N 20°8′E
- Country: Serbia
- Municipality: Obrenovac

Area
  - Total: 24.14 km^{2} (9.32 sq mi)
- Elevation: 66 m (217 ft)

Population (2011)
  - Total: 1,085
  - Density: 44.95/km^{2} (116.4/sq mi)
- Time zone: UTC+1 (CET)
  - Summer (DST): UTC+2 (CEST)

Krtinska is a village located in the municipality of Obrenovac, Belgrade, Serbia. As of 2011 census, it has a population of 1,085 inhabitants.
