= Urovci =

- Village
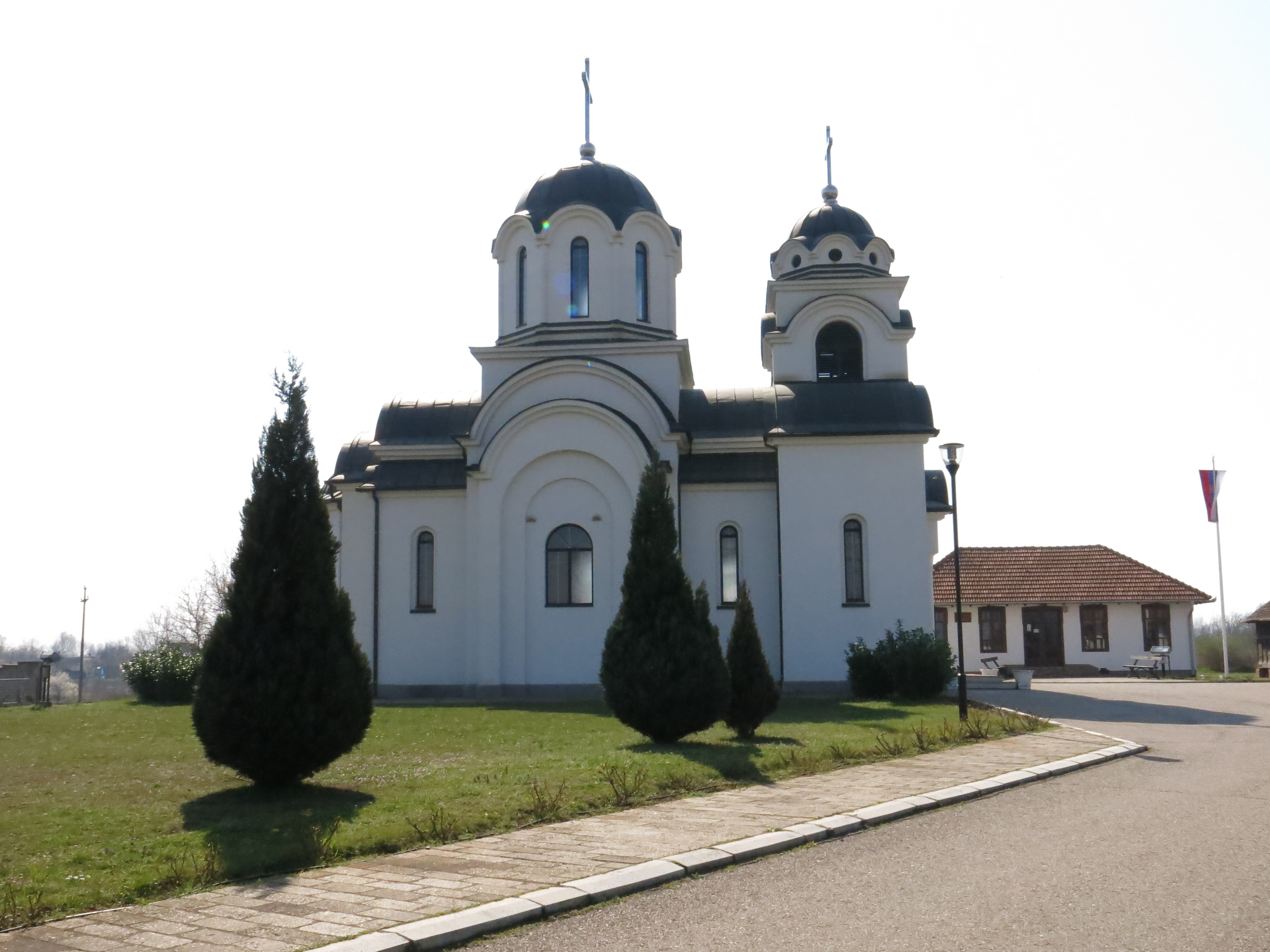
- Church of Saint Petka in Urovci
- Interactive map of Urovci
- Coordinates: 44.6675°N 20.1364°E
- Country: Serbia
- Municipality: Obrenovac

Area
  - Total: 9.91 km^{2} (3.83 sq mi)
- Elevation: 80 m (260 ft)

Population (2011)
  - Total: 1,521
  - Density: 153/km^{2} (398/sq mi)
- Time zone: UTC+1 (CET)
  - Summer (DST): UTC+2 (CEST)

Urovci is a village located in the municipality of Obrenovac, Belgrade, Serbia. As of 2011 census, it has a population of 1,521 inhabitants.
