= Ratari (Obrenovac) =

Ratari Ратари
- Village
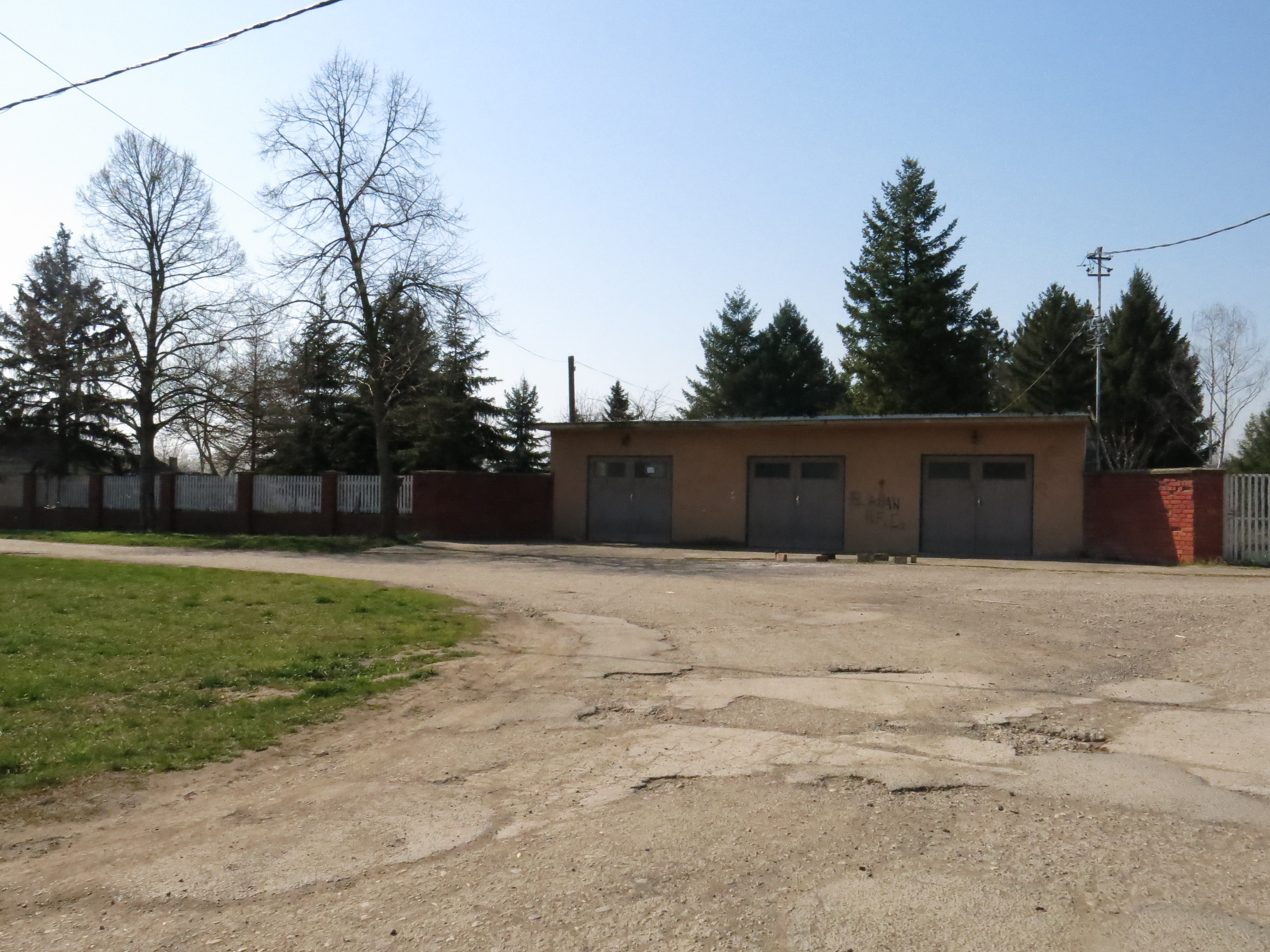
- Street of Ratari
- Interactive map of Ratari
- Coordinates: 44.6489°N 20.1011°E
- Country: Serbia
- Municipality: Obrenovac

Area
  - Total: 5.76 km^{2} (2.22 sq mi)
- Elevation: 66 m (217 ft)

Population (2011)
  - Total: 596
  - Density: 103/km^{2} (268/sq mi)
- Time zone: UTC+1 (CET)
  - Summer (DST): UTC+2 (CEST)

Ratari is a village located in the municipality of Obrenovac, Belgrade, Serbia. As of 2011 census, it has a population of 596 inhabitants.

== Demographics ==
There are 479 adult residents living in the settlement of Ratari, and the average age of the population is 41.5 years (38.9 for men and 44.2 for women). There are 174 households in the settlement, and the average number of members per household is 3.47.

This settlement is largely populated by Serbs (according to the 2002 census ).
