= Zvečka =

Zvečka Звечка
- Village
- Interactive map of Zvečka
- Coordinates: 44.6389°N 20.1647°E
- Country: Serbia
- Municipality: Obrenovac

Area
  - Total: 17.85 km^{2} (6.89 sq mi)
- Elevation: 67 m (220 ft)

Population (2011)
  - Total: 6,350
  - Density: 356/km^{2} (921/sq mi)
- Time zone: UTC+1 (CET)
  - Summer (DST): UTC+2 (CEST)

Zvečka is a village located in the municipality of Obrenovac, Belgrade, Serbia. As of 2011 census, it has a population of 6,350 inhabitants.
