= Tamnava =

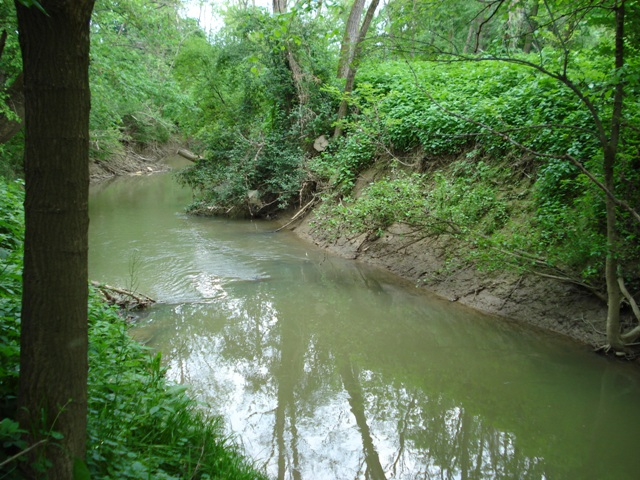
- Tamnava

Location
- Country: Serbia

Physical characteristics
- Source
  - location: Vlašić mountain
  - elevation: 100 m (330 ft)
- Mouth
  - location: Kolubara river, near Draževac
  - coordinates: 44.5789°N 20.2091°E
- Length: 78.5 km (48.8 mi)
- Basin size: 929 km^{2} (359 sq mi)

Basin features
- Progression: Kolubara→ Sava→ Danube→ Black Sea

The Tamnava (Serbian Cyrillic: Тамнава) is a river in western Serbia. It is a 90 km (56 mi)-long left tributary of the Kolubara River and also gives the name to the surrounding region of Tamnava.

== Origin ==
The Tamnava originates from several small streams from the hill of Konjsko brdo (Cyrillic: Коњско брдо; Horse hill) on the northern slopes of Vlašić mountain, northwest of the town of Valjevo, less than a kilometer away from the source of its major tributary, the Ub River. The Tamnava passes next to the village of Miličinica, makes a sharp turn to the northwest along the Vlašić mountain, passes the village of Donje Crniljevo and makes another sharp, elbow turn to the east around the Braznik hill (Cyrillic: Бразник), near the Gradojević village. At the village of Kamenica, the Tamnava makes almost complete circle (triangle, in this case) as it comes just a kilometer away from its own furthermost source. In this early flow, the Tamnava makes the southeastern border of the Pocerina region of western Serbia.

== Tamnava region ==
The Tamnava region begins as the river passes between the village of Subotica and a small town and regional center of Koceljeva. The villages of Tamnava, Novaci, Kalinovac, Trlić, Sovljak and Crvena Jabuka are located on the river which has been followed by the satellite flow of the Ub River ever from the source on the Vlašić mountain. The Ub finally meets the Tamnava near the village of Šarbane. The river turns northeast and after it passes the village of Liso Polje flows into the Kolubara, south of the Belgrade's suburb of Obrenovac.

The region is low, elongated in the west–east direction, encompassing also the valleys of the Ub and Kladnica rivers. It is part of the southern Pannonian plain, that is, of the ancient Bay of Kolubara of the Pannonian Sea. The region is rich in coal (Tamnava coal mines) which is part of the vast Kolubara coal basin.

The Tamnava drains an area of 930 km^{2} (360 sq mi), and, through the Kolubara, belongs to the Black Sea drainage basin and it is not navigable. The name of the river, Tamnava, in Serbian means the dark river.
