= Ub (river) =

Ub (Уб)
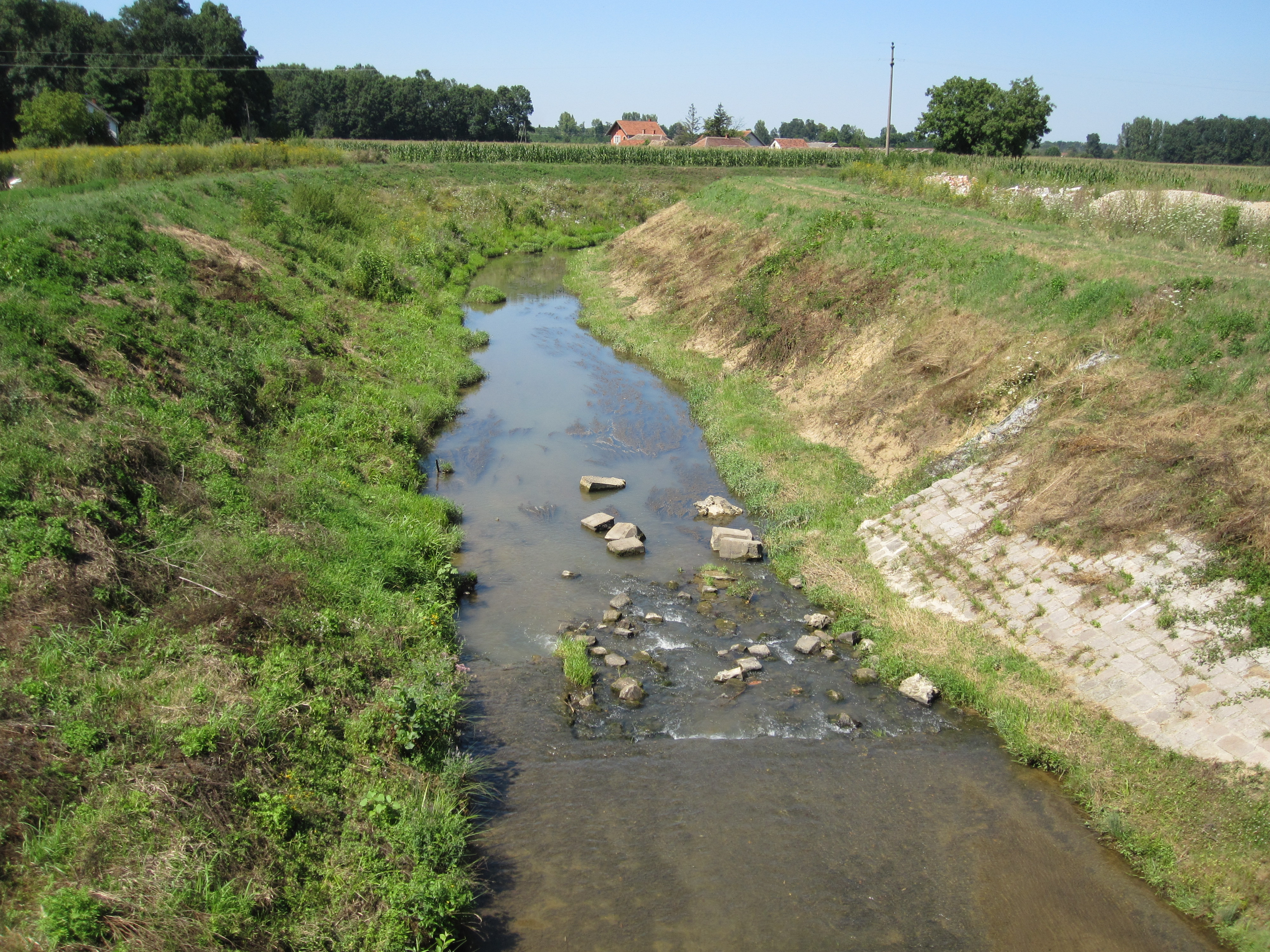

Location
- Country: Serbia

Physical characteristics
- Source
  - location: Vlašić mountain, northeast of Osečina, Serbia
- Mouth
  - location: Tamnava river, near Šarbane, Serbia
  - coordinates: 44.5101°N 20.1479°E
- Length: 57 km (35 mi)
- Basin size: 274 km^{2} (106 sq mi)

Basin features
- Progression: Tamnava→ Kolubara→ Sava→ Danube→ Black Sea

The Ub (Serbian Cyrillic: Уб) is a river in western Serbia, a 57 km-long right and longest tributary to Tamnava river.

== Characteristics ==
The Ub originates from the Vlašić mountain in Podgorina region of west Serbia, near the village of Kasapo. From its source to the mouth, the river flows to the east, parallel to the river Tamnava, which it will eventually join.

The villages located in the upper section of the river's flow are Družetić, Pambukovica and Čučuge, where the Ub slightly turns to the north, passes through the villages of Tvrdojevac and Zvizdar, and the small town of Ub, named after the river.

The Ub continues to the north and meets the Tamnava river near the village of Šarbane. The river drains an area of 274 km², belongs to the Black Sea drainage basin and it is not navigable.

== Lake Pambukovica ==
In January 2021, plans for the dam and reservoir "Pambukovica" were announced. The dam will regulate high water levels during the frequent floods in the Kolubara-Tamnava basin, and will provide water for irrigation during the dry seasons. The dam will be 208 m (682 ft) long, 26.5 m (87 ft) high, and the crown will be 6 m (20 ft) wide. The lake will cover 1.3 km^{2} (0.50 sq mi) and store 8,000,000 m^{3} (280,000,000 cu ft). Distributive irrigation network will extend to 62 km (39 mi) and cover 26.3 km^{2} (10.2 sq mi). The dam will be located 21 km (13 mi) upstream from the town of Ub, on the territory of the villages Pambukovica, Raduša and Gola Glava. Construction was planned to start at the end of 2021, and to be finished in three years.

== Sources ==
- Mala Prosvetina Enciklopedija, Third edition (1985); Prosveta; ISBN 86-07-00001-2
- Jovan Đ. Marković (1990): Enciklopedijski geografski leksikon Jugoslavije Svjetlost-Sarajevo; ISBN 86-01-02651-6
