= Družetić =

- Village (Selo)
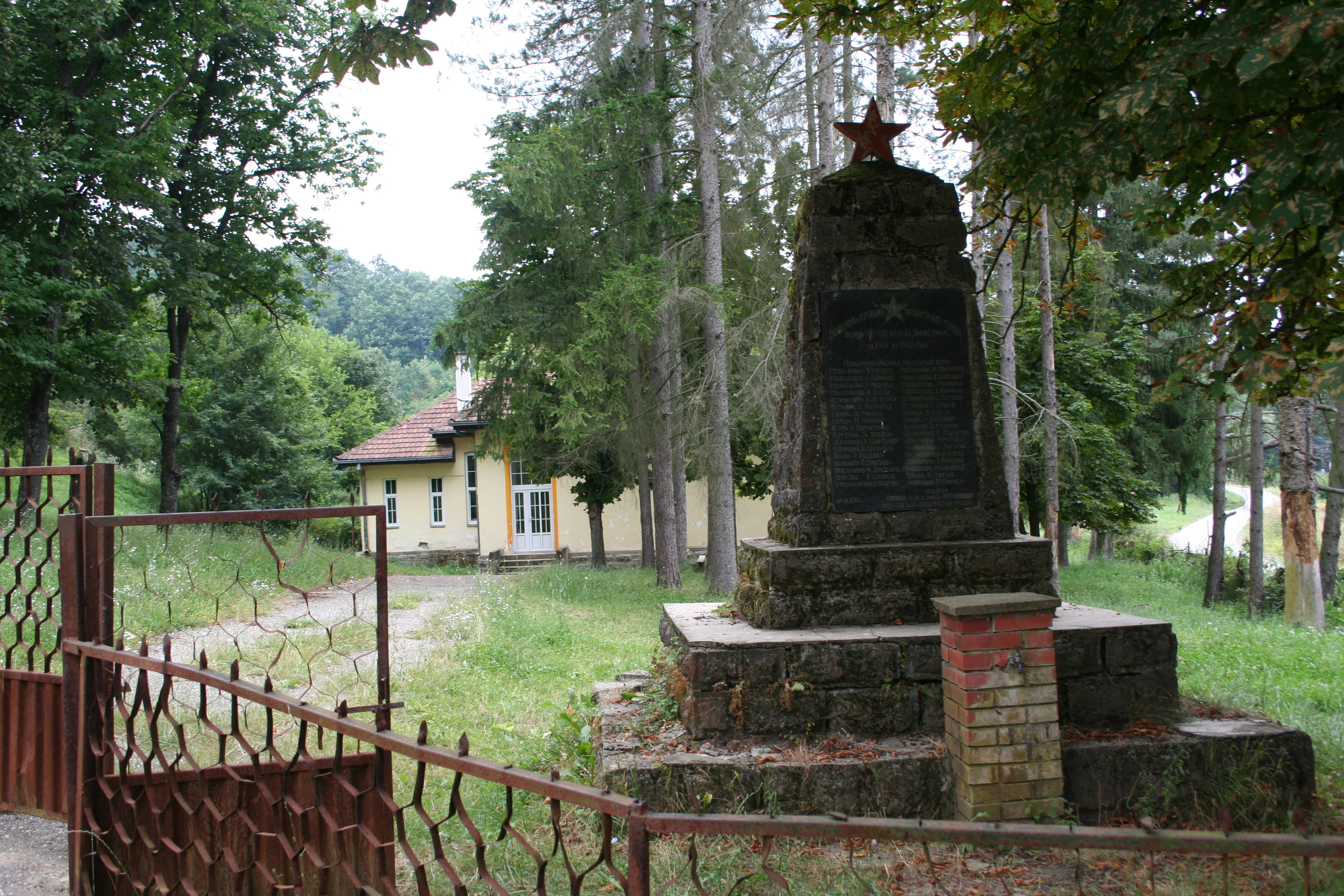

- Location within Serbia
- Coordinates: 44°25′47″N 19°50′28″E
- Country: Serbia
- Municipality: Koceljeva
- Time zone: UTC+1 (CET)
  - Summer (DST): UTC+2 (CEST)

Družetić (Serbian Cyrillic: Дружетић) is a village in Serbia. It is situated on the banks of the Ub river in the Koceljeva municipality, in the Mačva District of Central Serbia. The village had a Serb ethnic majority and a population of 501 in 2002.

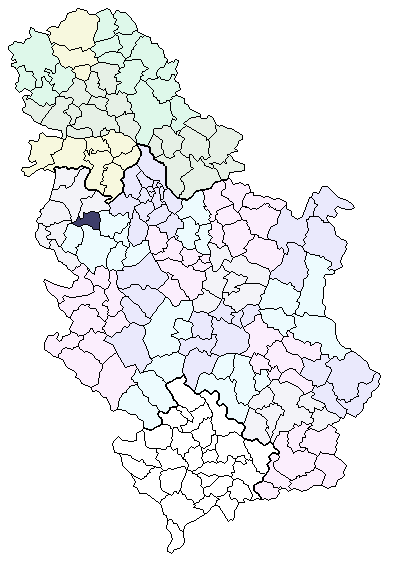
Location of the Koceljeva municipality in Serbia

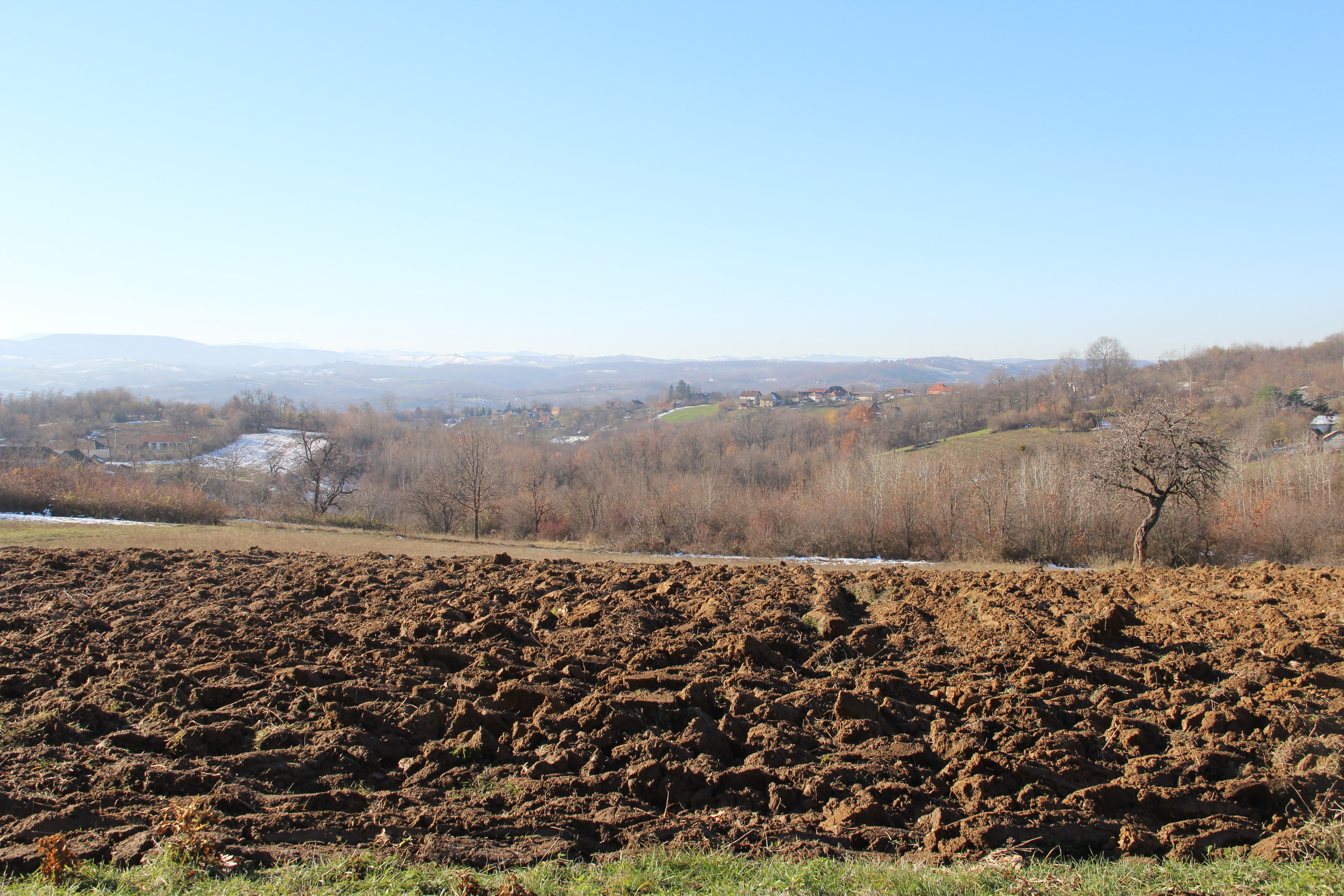

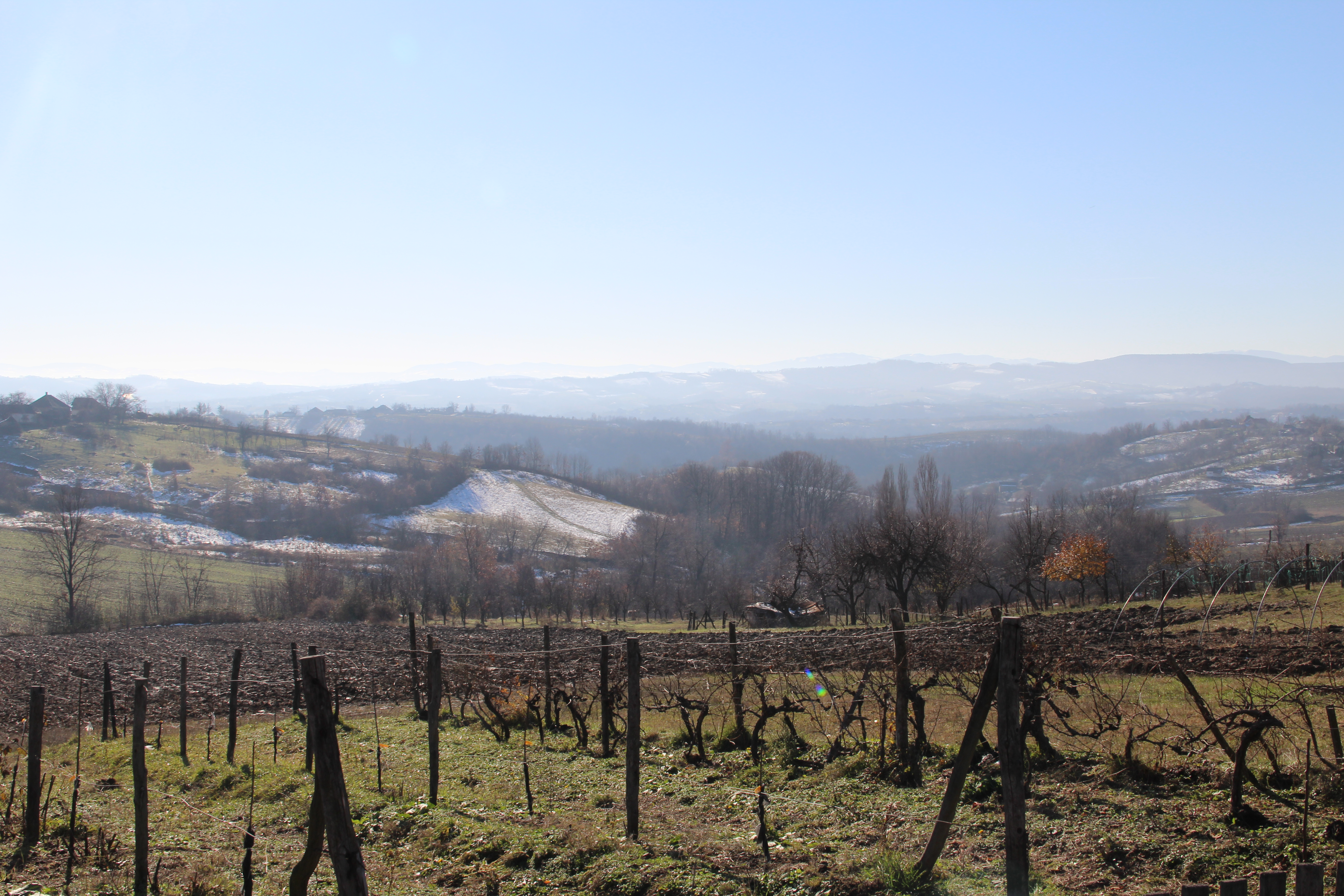

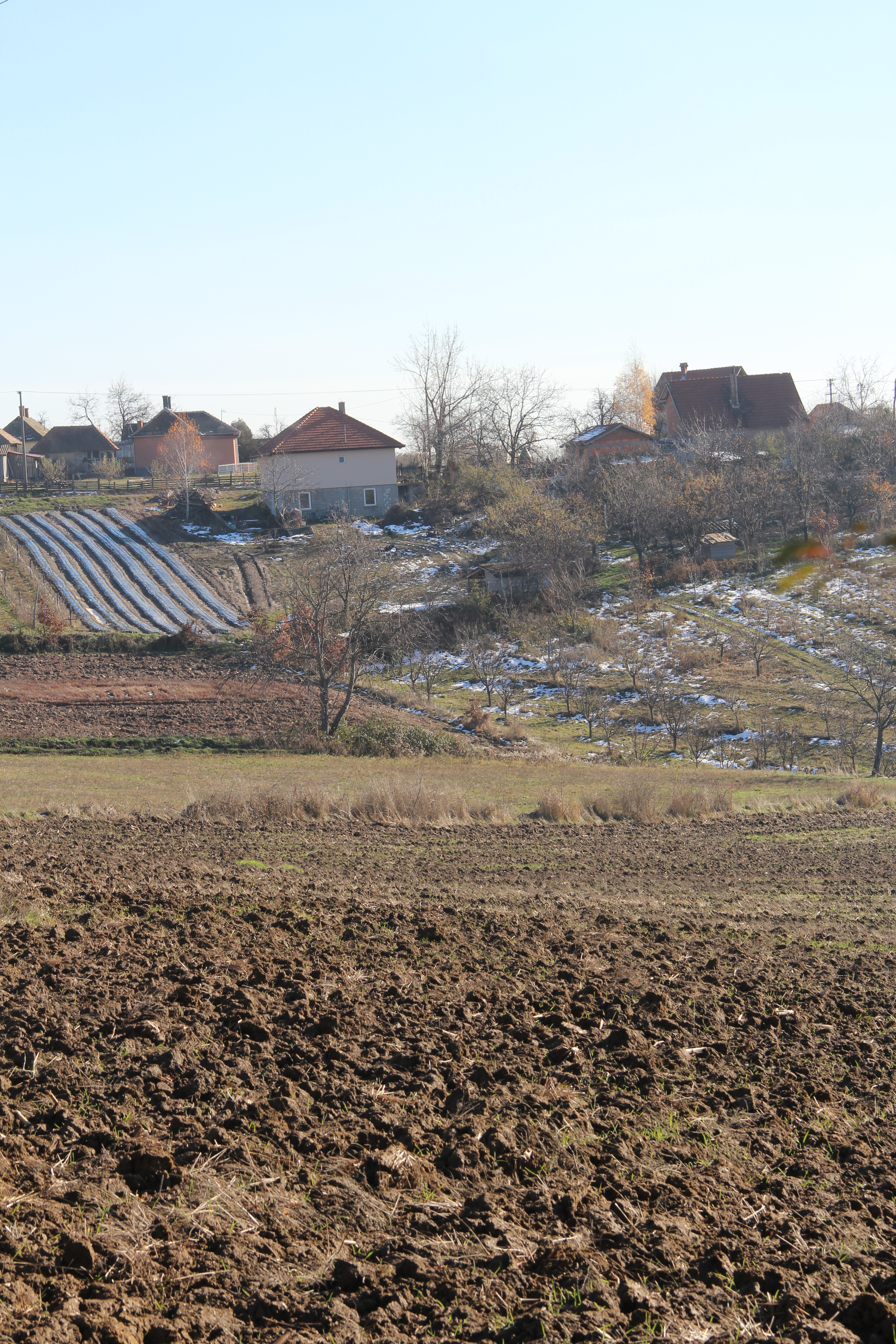

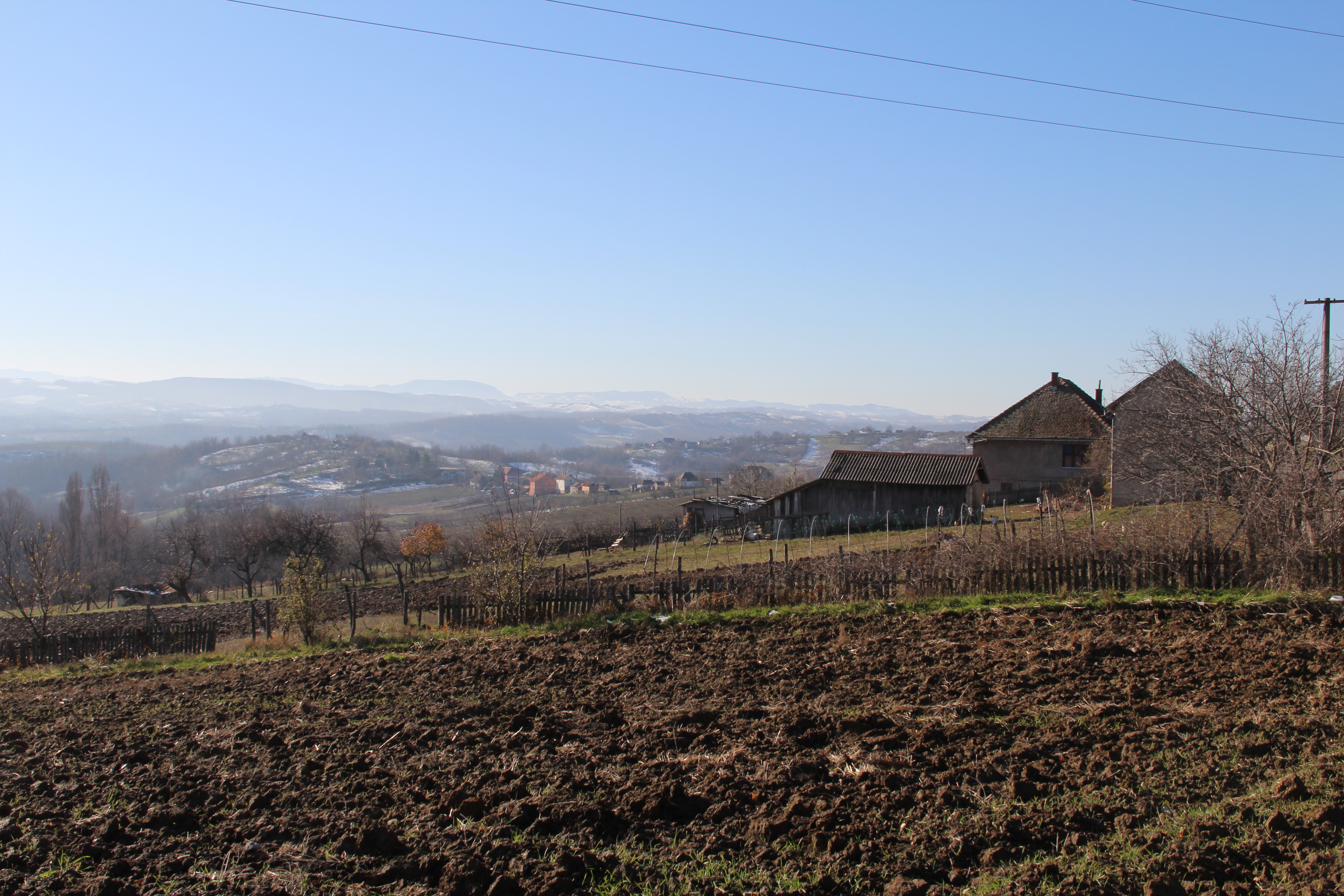

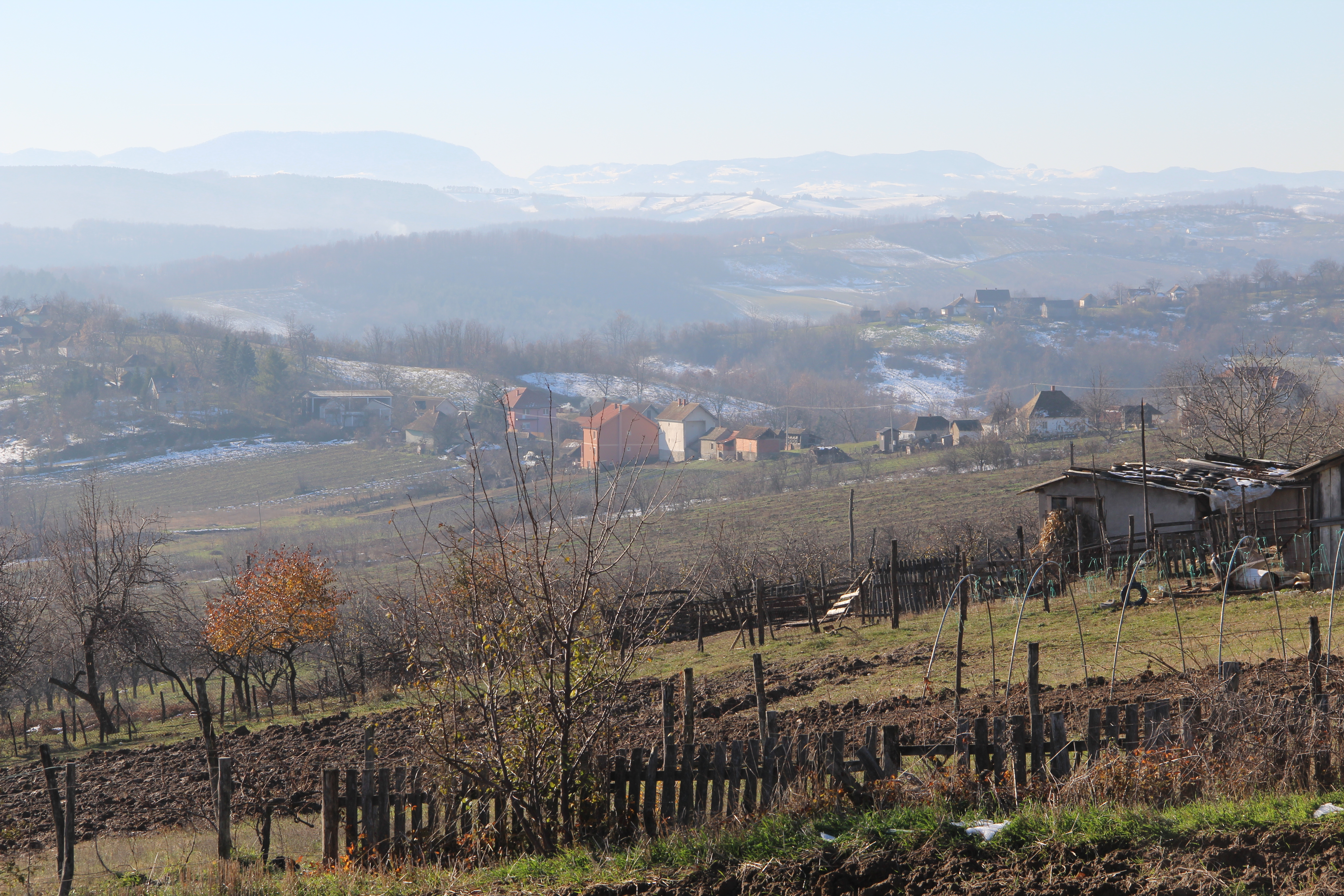

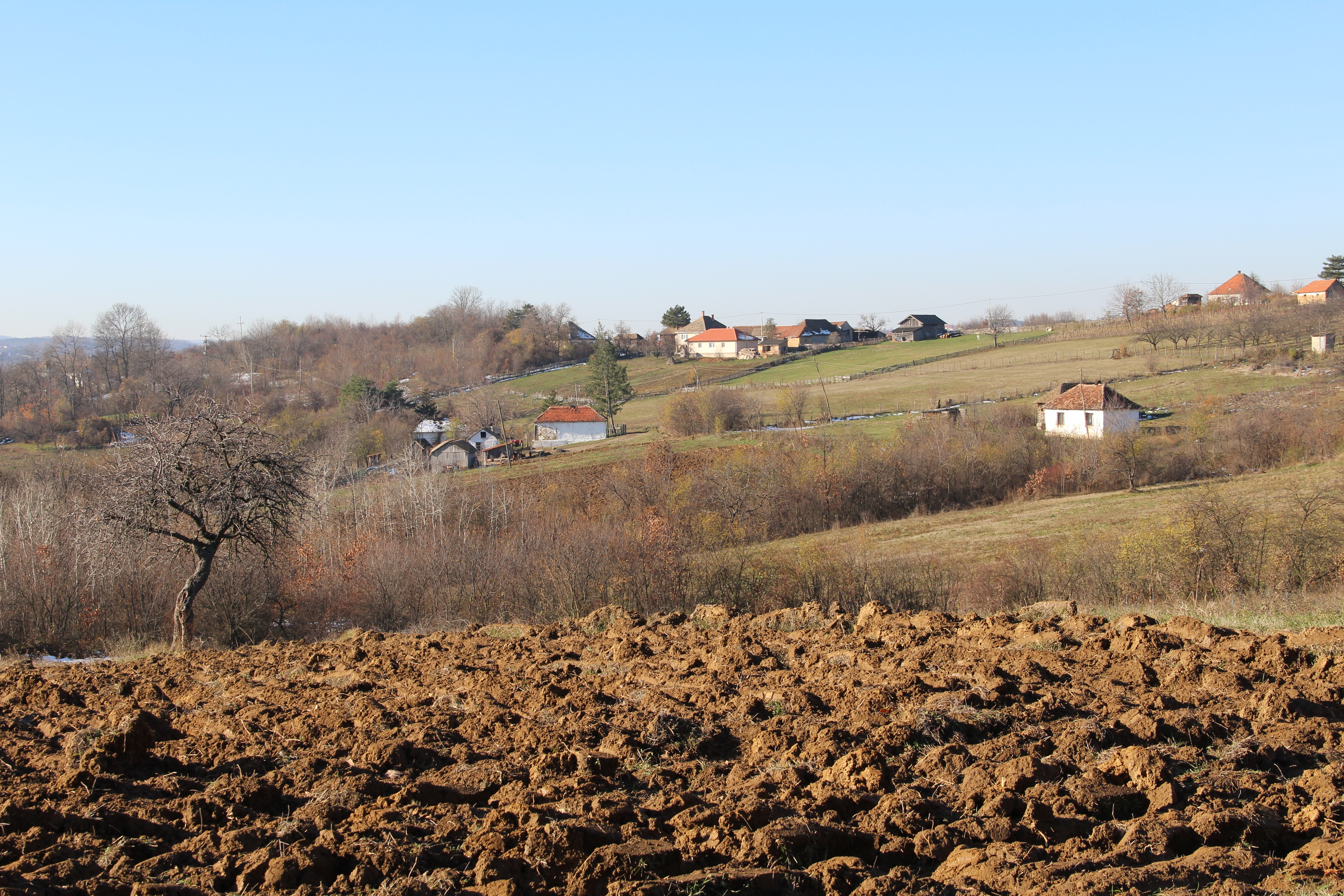

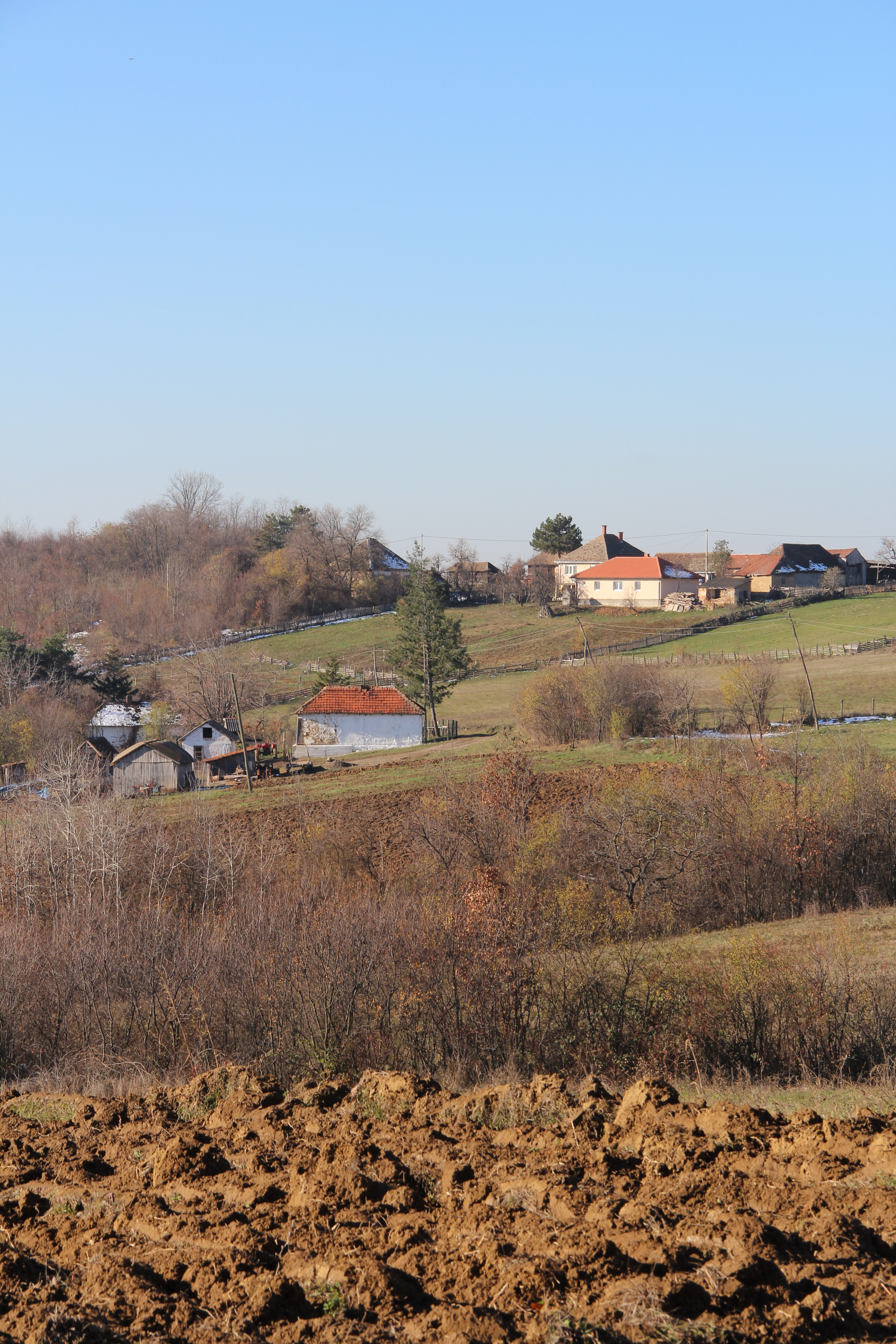

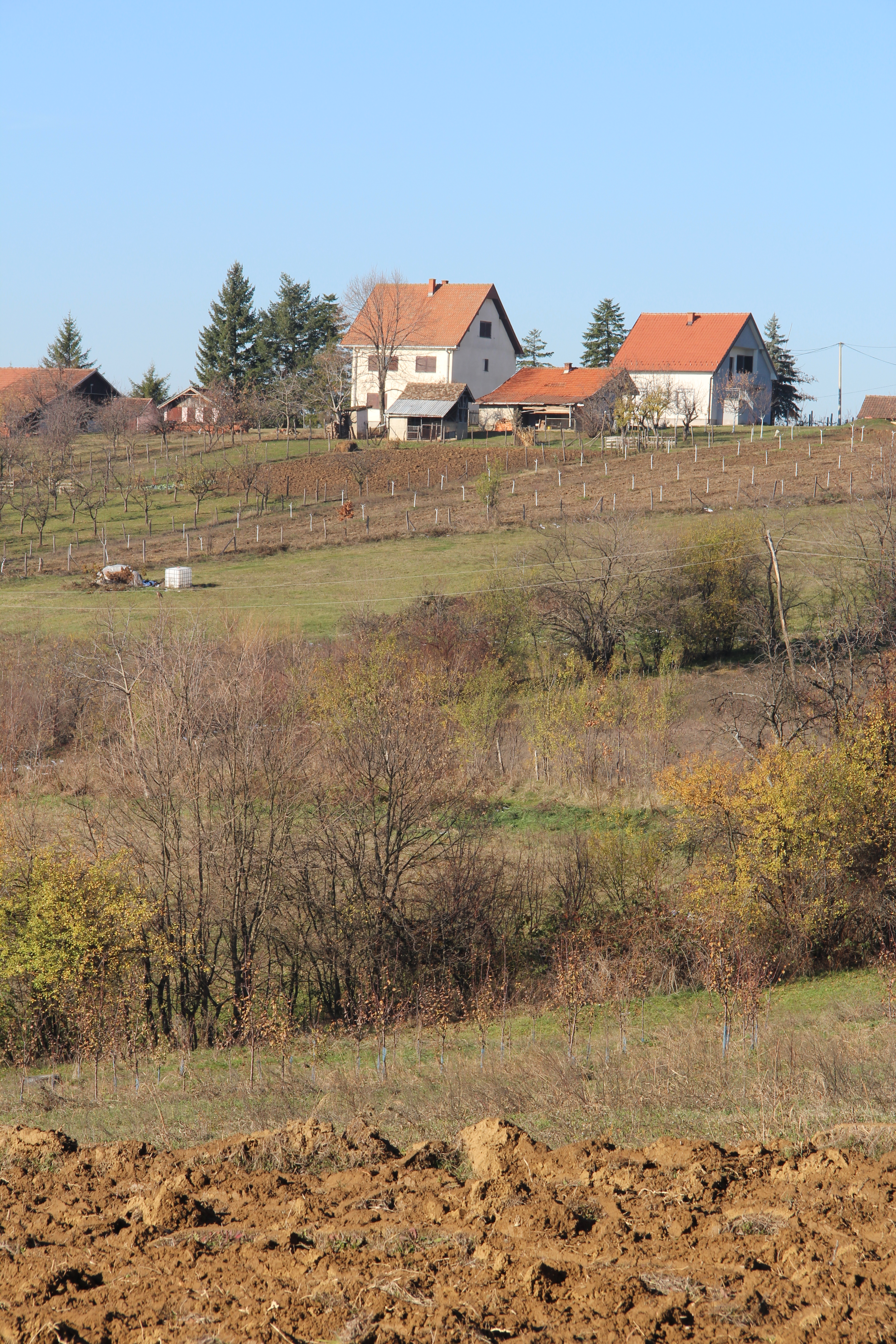

== Historical population ==
- 1948: 1,205
- 1953: 1,181
- 1961: 1,104
- 1971: 1,012
- 1981: 983
- 1991: 812
- 2002: 669

== See also ==
- List of places in Serbia
