= Andrej Bicenko =

Russian fresco painter

Andrei Bicenko
- Born: Andrei Vasilevich Bicenko; October 17, 1886; Kursk, Russia
- Died: December 16, 1973 (age 87); Cleveland, United States
- Education: Sankt Petersburg Academy
- Known for: Painting, Muralist
- Movement: Neo-Byzantine

Andrej Bicenko (October 17, 1886 – December 16, 1973) also spelled Andrei Bicenko and Andrey Bitsenko (Russian: Андрей Васильевич Биценко) was a well-known Russian fresco painter who spent the early part of his career in Serbia. When Yugoslavia fell to the communists at the end of World War II, he emigrated to the United States of America where he continued painting Orthodox churches, including St. Theodosius Russian Orthodox Cathedral in Cleveland, Ohio.

== Biography ==
Bicenko was born in Kursk, Imperial Russia in 1886. There is no information about his early life and childhood. He was a graduate artist with a degree from Sankt Petersburg Academy. Also, he finished architecture and sculpture school in Moscow. In 1914, he was awarded First prize in Kiev painting contest. After the Russian socialist revolution, he retreated with General Anton Denikin's troops and lived for a time on the island of Lemnos and a few months later he settled in the Kingdom of Serbs, Croats and Slovenes. At first, he lived and worked in Zrenjanin where he became a painting teacher in First Serbian Gymnasium. Four years later he went to Belgrade. From 1924 to 1941 he was painting fresco paintings on many church walls in multiple places in Yugoslavia.

When the Communist regime took control in Yugoslavia, Bicenko fled to the United States. At first, he was situated in Philadelphia, and then in Cleveland and New York City. He continued to paint frescos in many Orthodox Christian churches in the United States. Andrei Bicenko died in 1973 in Cleveland.

== Notable works ==
Portraits, fresco paintings, and murals make up the majority of Bicenko's works. The most important period in his artistic career was from 1924 to 1941 in Serbia. He left an exceedingly large number of works behind. In addition to the frescoes he painted throughout Belgrade and Serbia, he also made many portraits. The most famous portrait in our country is the portrait of King Aleksandar Karađorđević, which is kept in Pančevo.

He painted icons for the iconostases at:

- Church in the Roman Monastery
- Church in Kragujevac
- Church in Blace
- Memorial chapel on the top of Rtnje (together with a colleague, Rus Kolesnikov) in 1934

He also painted frescoes in the following churches:

- Church of the Assumption in Belgrade, 1937
- Church of the Rosary on Kalemegdan
- Church of St. George in Bežanija
- Church of St. George in Smederevo, 1936
- Church of the Holy Prophet Jeremiah in Vrbovec near Smederevo
- Churches in Kostolac (Todićeva), Velika Plana and Šabac
- Churches in Zrenjanin and Prijepolje
- Cathedral in Leskovac
- Ružica Church in Belgrade
- Church of the Nativity of The Most Holy Theotokos, Novaci
- Church of the Assumption of the Blessed Virgin in Ratari

In the United States:

- St. Nicholas Church in Philadelphia
- Churches in Cleveland and New York

From the mentioned works, we should single out the fresco of Jesus' sermon to the Apostles on the west wall of the Church of the Rosary, where Bicenko, in addition to the figures of the Apostles, painted King Peter I of Serbia, Russian Tsar Nikolai Romanov and King Peter's great-grandson Prince Alexander Karađorđević.

Also, we should mention the fresco in the Church of the Nativity of the Most Holy Mother of God in Novaci, which Bitsenko painted in 1934, under which he left his signature, and the year of painting. This composition shows the famous scene of Jesus passing through the ears on the Sabbath day. The fresco is dominated by the yellow color of the ears and is one of the rare compositions in Serbian Orthodox churches.

== See also ==
- List of Serbian painters
