= Church of the Nativity of the Theotokos, Novaci =

Church in Kolubara District, Serbia

Coordinates: 44°28′39″N 19°56′02″E

Church of Nativity of The Most Holy Theotokos
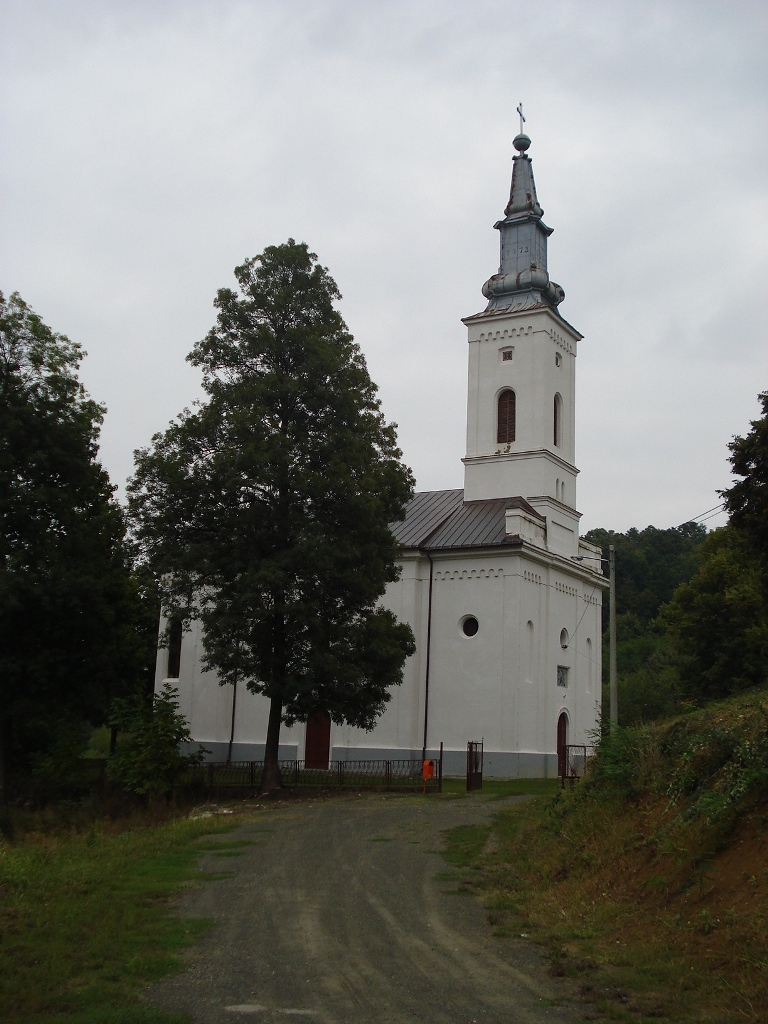
- Church of Nativity of The Most Holy Theotokos
- Location: Novaci, 14213 Pambukovica, Serbia
- Country: Serbia
- Denomination: Serbian Orthodox Church
- Website: Namesnistvo tamnavsko

History
- Founded: 1857

Architecture
- Years built: 1857

Administration
- Diocese: Valjevo eparchy

Clergy
- Bishop: Mitropolite of Valjevo Milutin
- Priest: Pr. Srdjan Filipovic

Church of Nativity of The Most Holy Theotokos (Serbian: Црква Рођења Пресвете Богородице) is a Serbian Orthodox church in the village of Novaci, Serbia. It was built in 1857 and is dedicated to the Nativity of The Most Holy Theotokos (Virgin Mary).

== History ==
A church at Novaci was recorded in the 1735 census of the Metropolitanate of Belgrade. According to the national heritage register, that building burned during Koča's Frontier. The present church was erected in 1857 on a plateau near the Ub–Koceljeva road.

== Feast day ==
The feast day of the church and the whole village of Novaci is the day of the nativity of the Virgin Mary, September 21 (Gregorian calendar) or September 8 (Julian calendar). That holiday is named Mala Gospojina ("Little Day of Our Lady").

== Interior decoration ==
The wooden iconostasis was made in 1924. Its low form follows the type of altar screen associated with the Oplenac mausoleum. Twisted columns separate the icon panels, which are framed by carved plant motifs. The wall paintings and icons were executed in 1933–1934 by the Russian émigré artist Andrej Vasiljević Bicenko, with Mateja F. Gajtinger also contributing to the interior decoration.

== Frescos ==
The church was painted in 1937 by the famous Russian painter Andrej Bicenko. Bicenko had escaped from Russia after the October Revolution, and lived in Serbia from 1920 to 1951, during which time he painted many frescos. A particularly interesting fresco in this church is Lord of Sabbath, which shows Jesus and his disciples walking through grain fields on the Sabbath day.

== Architecture ==
The church is a single-nave building with three semicircular projections: the sanctuary apse at the east end and two choir apses opening from the nave. A slightly narrower narthex occupies the west end, with a gallery and a tall bell tower above it. The tower's Baroque-style cap is a later addition. The otherwise restrained façades are articulated by shallow pilasters, a band of blind arcades below the roofline, and shallow niches beside the west entrance and on the exterior of the sanctuary apse. Doors also open from both sides of the nave.

== See also ==
- Novaci (Ub)
- Churches in Serbia
- Andrej Bicenko
