= Novaci (Ub) =

Novaci Новаци
- Village (Selo)
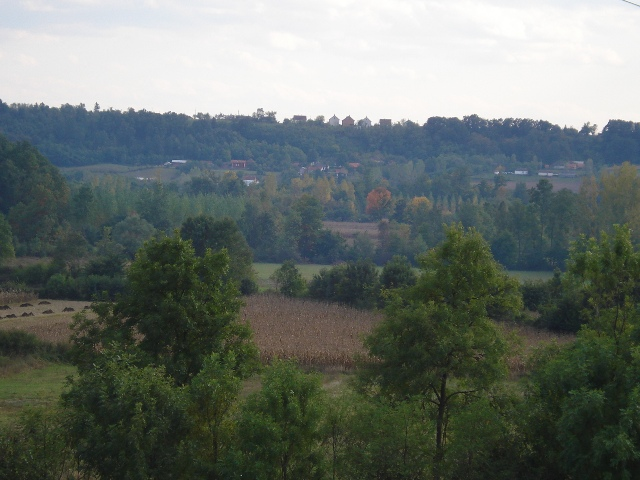
- Novaci

- Location within Serbia
- Coordinates: 44°28′32″N 19°54′13″E
- Country: Serbia
- Districts: Kolubara District
- Municipality: Ub

Area
  - Total: 17.75 km^{2} (6.85 sq mi)
- Elevation: 119 m (390 ft)

Population (2011)
  - Total: 711
  - Density: 40.1/km^{2} (104/sq mi)
- Time zone: UTC+1 (CET)
  - Summer (DST): UTC+2 (CEST)
- Postal code: 14213
- Area code: 014
- Vehicle registration: UB

Novaci (Serbian Cyrillic: Новаци; pronounced [nɔʋǎːtsi]) is a village in the municipality of Ub, Kolubara District, Western Serbia. The total population was 711, according to the 2011 census. The most important site in the village is the Church of the Nativity of the Theotokos, built in 1857.

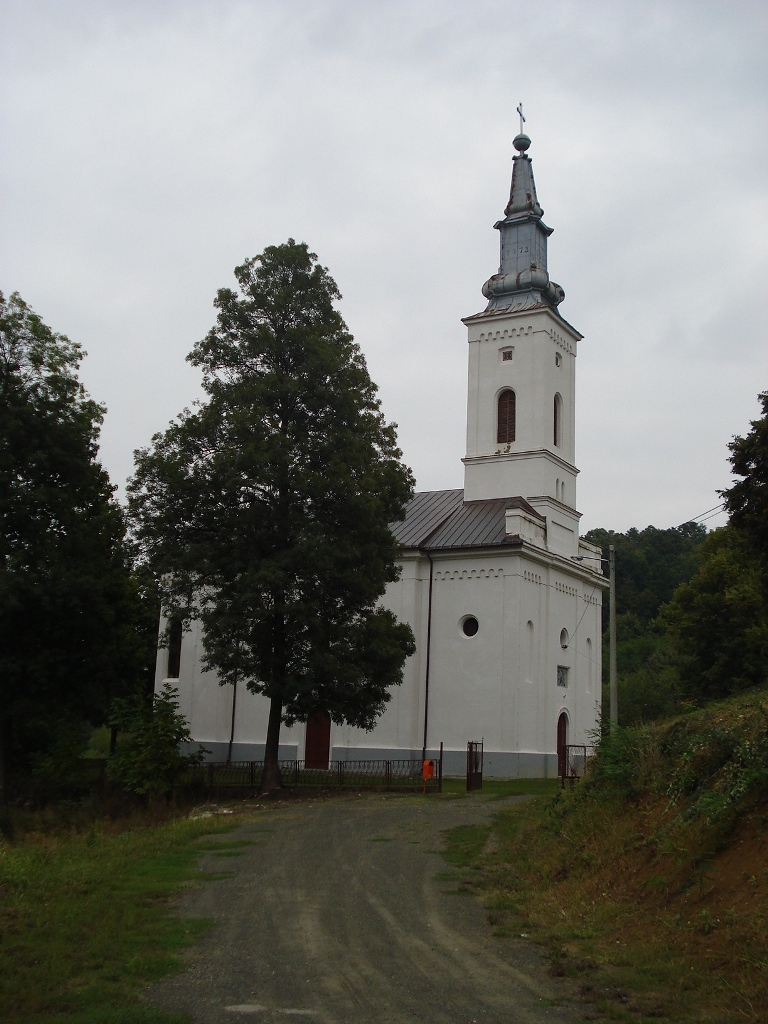
Church of the Nativity of The Most Holy Theotokos, Novaci

== History ==
The first written record of the name of the village Novaci dates to 1827 in Vuk Karadzic's Danica.

In 1844, there was a Primary court, elementary school and church in the village. The first teacher was appointed in 1842, and the new church built in 1857. Novaci was a centre of Novaci municipality, which included the villages of Tulari and Zukve.

== Geography ==
The village is situated on both sides of the Tamnava River.

== Population ==
The first census was conducted in 1834. At that time, the village had 343 inhabitants.

- 1844- 391 inh.
- 1863- 433
- 1866- 470
- 1874- 509
- 1884- 560
- 1890- 651
- 1895- 568
- 1910- 1094
- 1916- 717

== See also ==
- Andrej Bicenko
- Tamnava
- Ub, Serbia
