= Miličinica =

- Village (Selo)
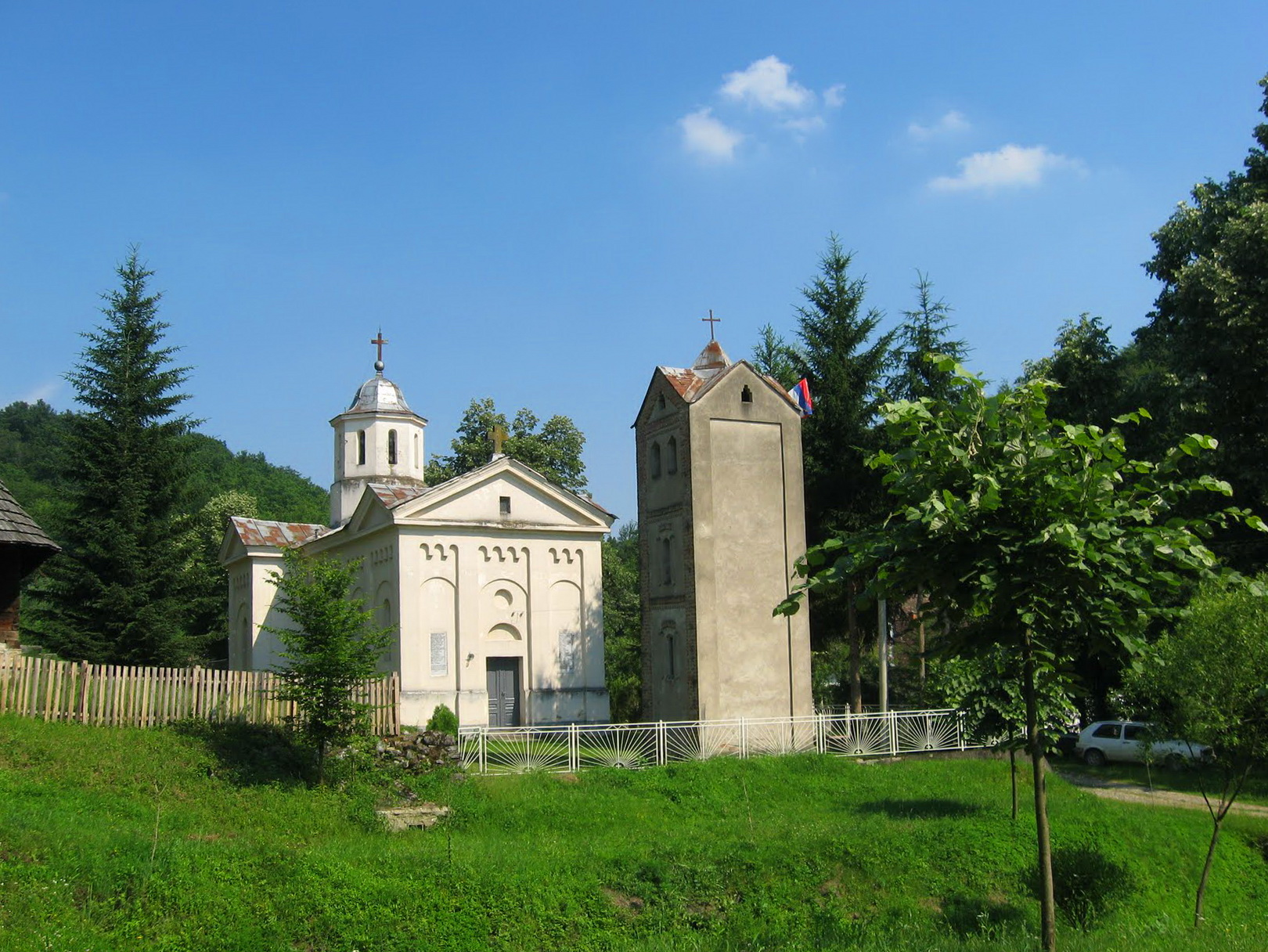

- Location within Serbia
- Coordinates: 44°25′N 19°42′E
- Country: Serbia
- District: Kolubara District
- Municipality: Valjevo

Population (2002)
  - Total: 913
- Time zone: UTC+1 (CET)
  - Summer (DST): UTC+2 (CEST)

Miličinica is a village in the municipality of Valjevo, Serbia. According to the 2002 census, the village has a population of 913 people.

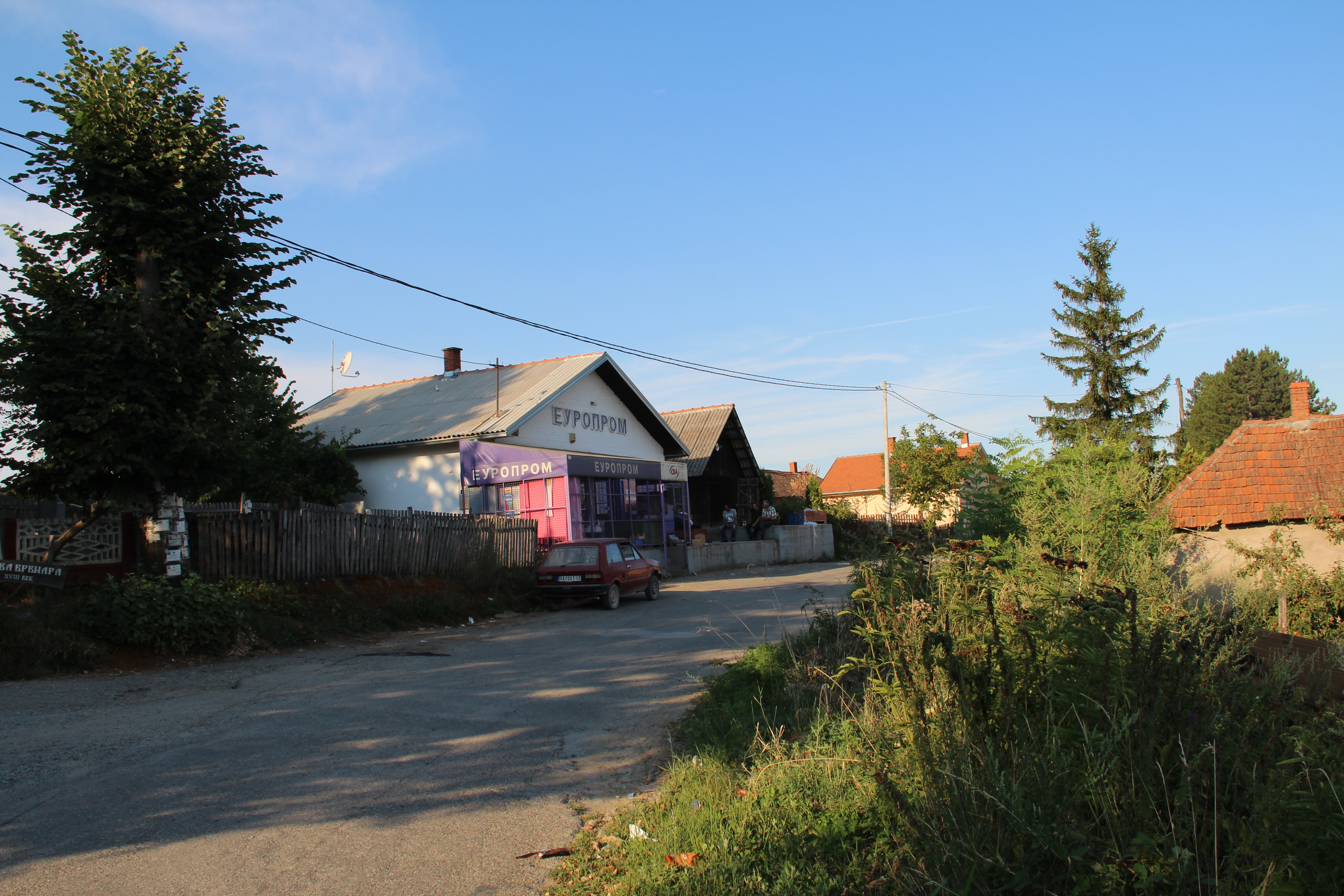
Miličinica - Panorama

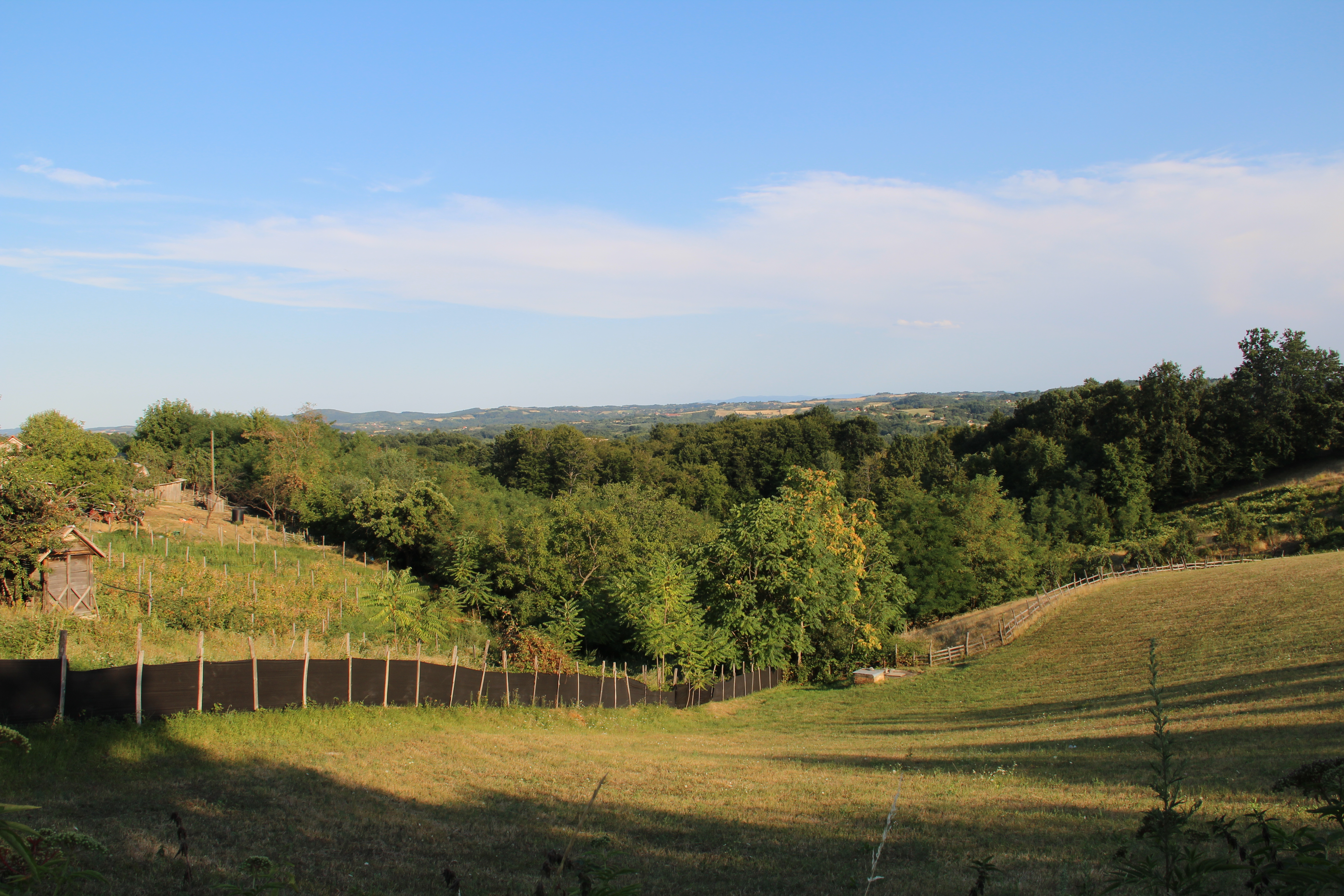
Miličinica - Panorama

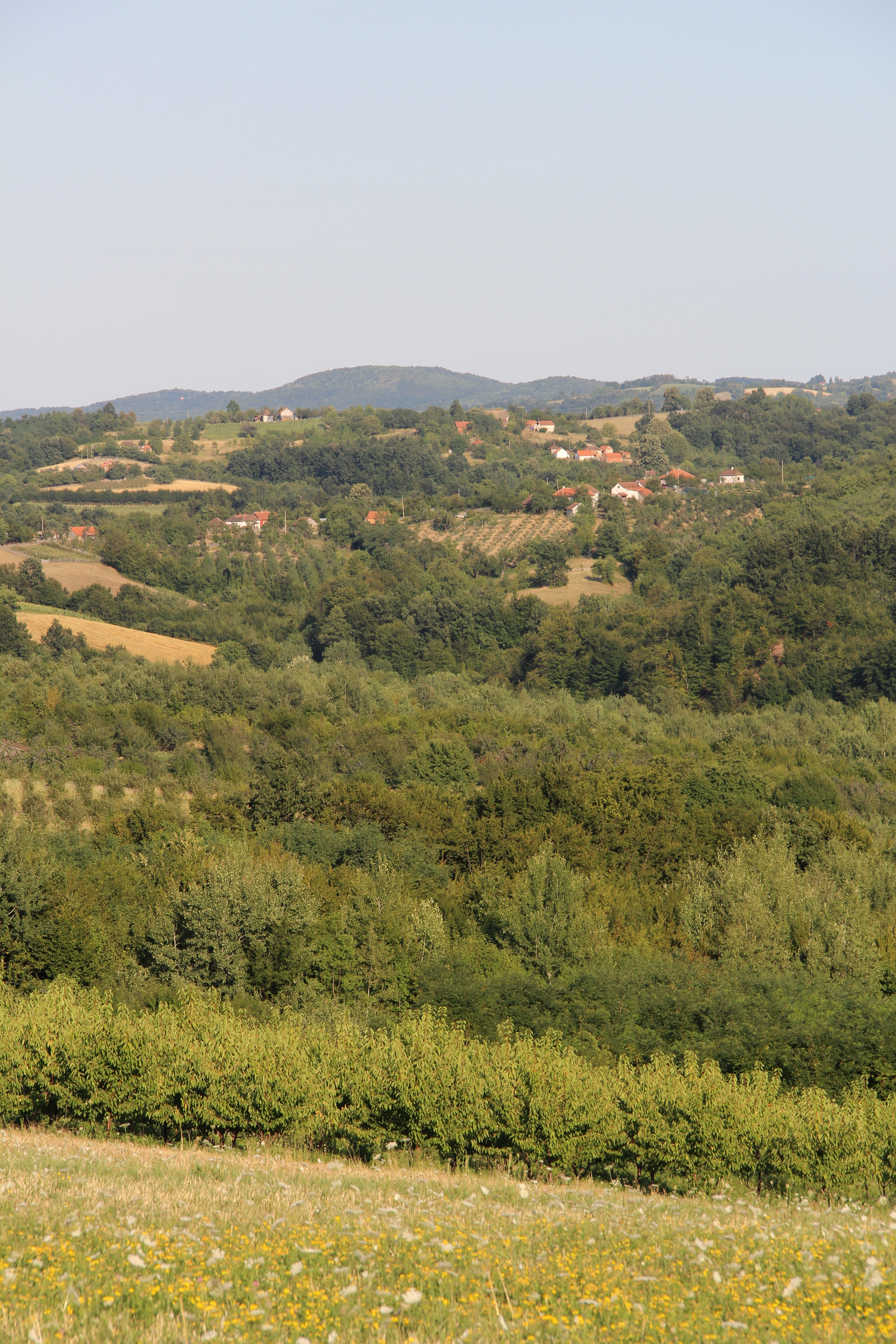
Miličinica - Panorama

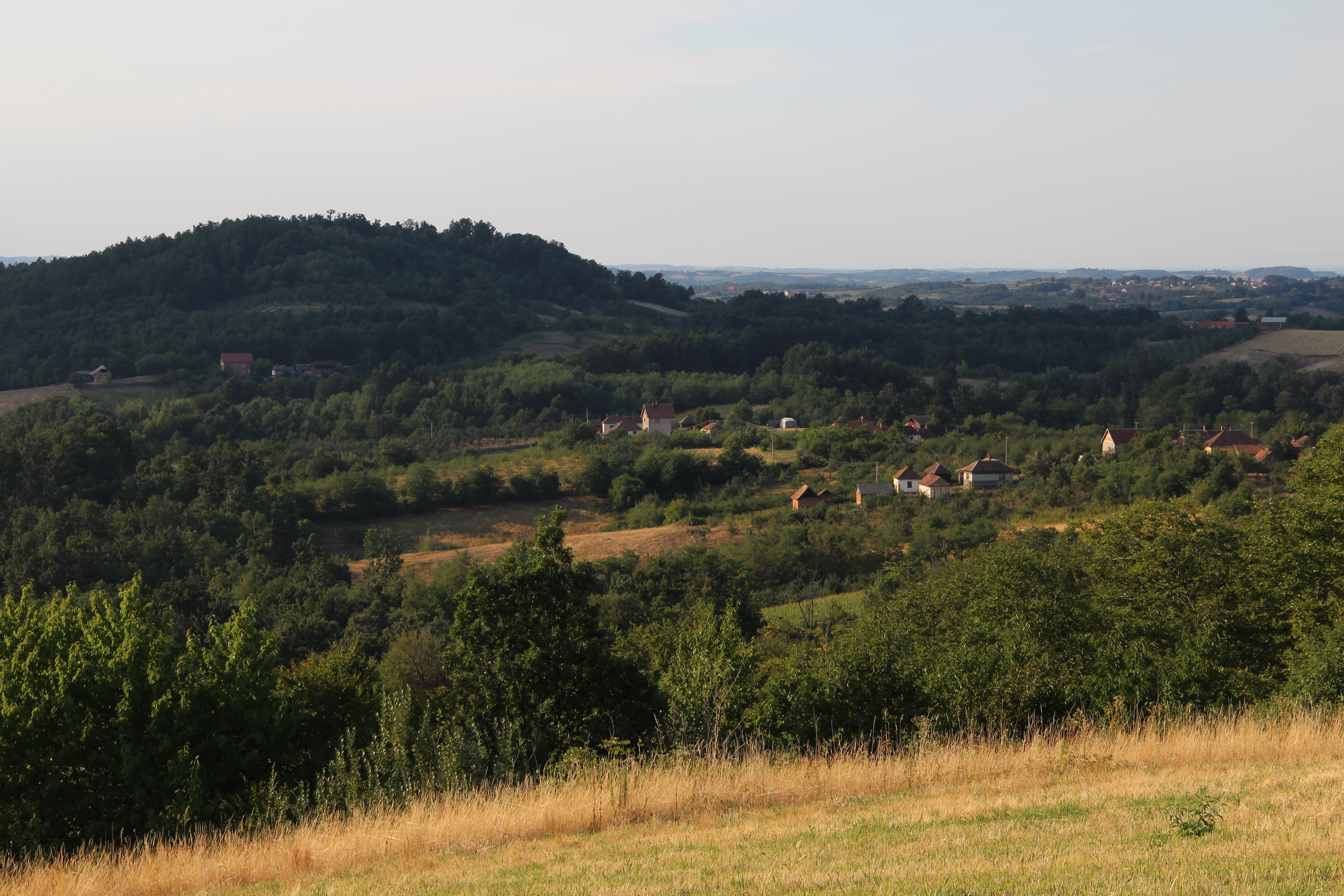
Miličinica - Panorama

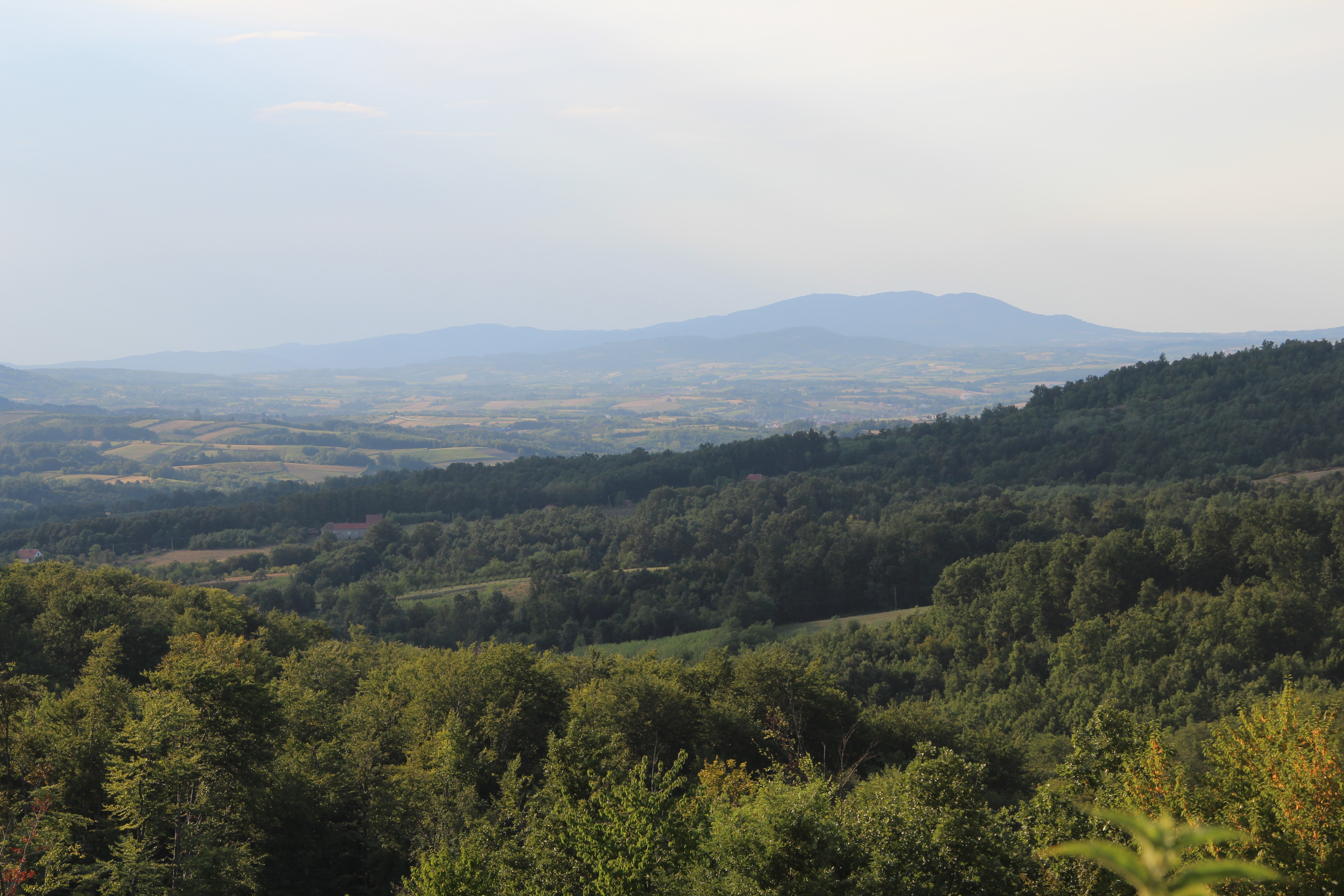
Miličinica - Panorama

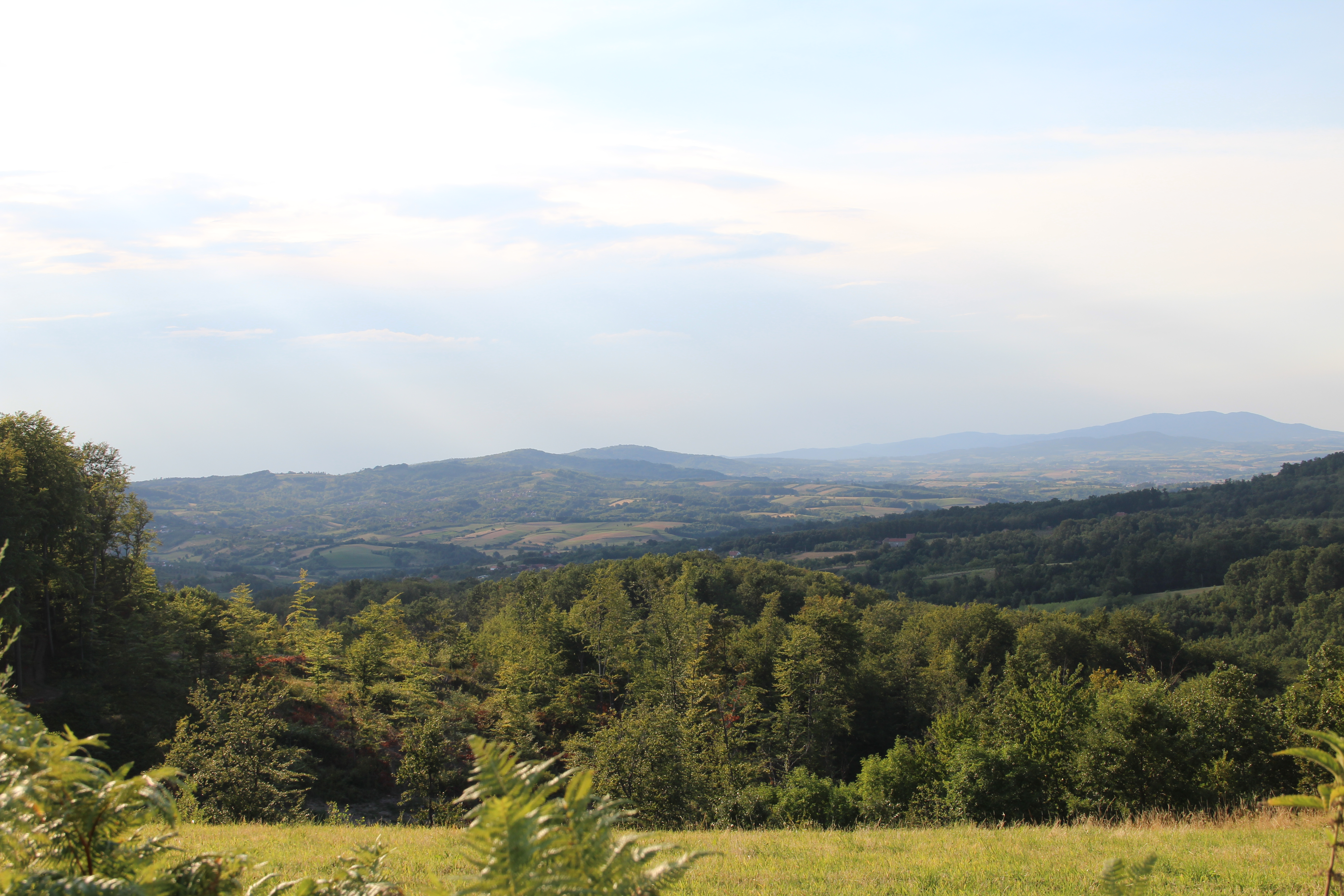
Miličinica - Panorama

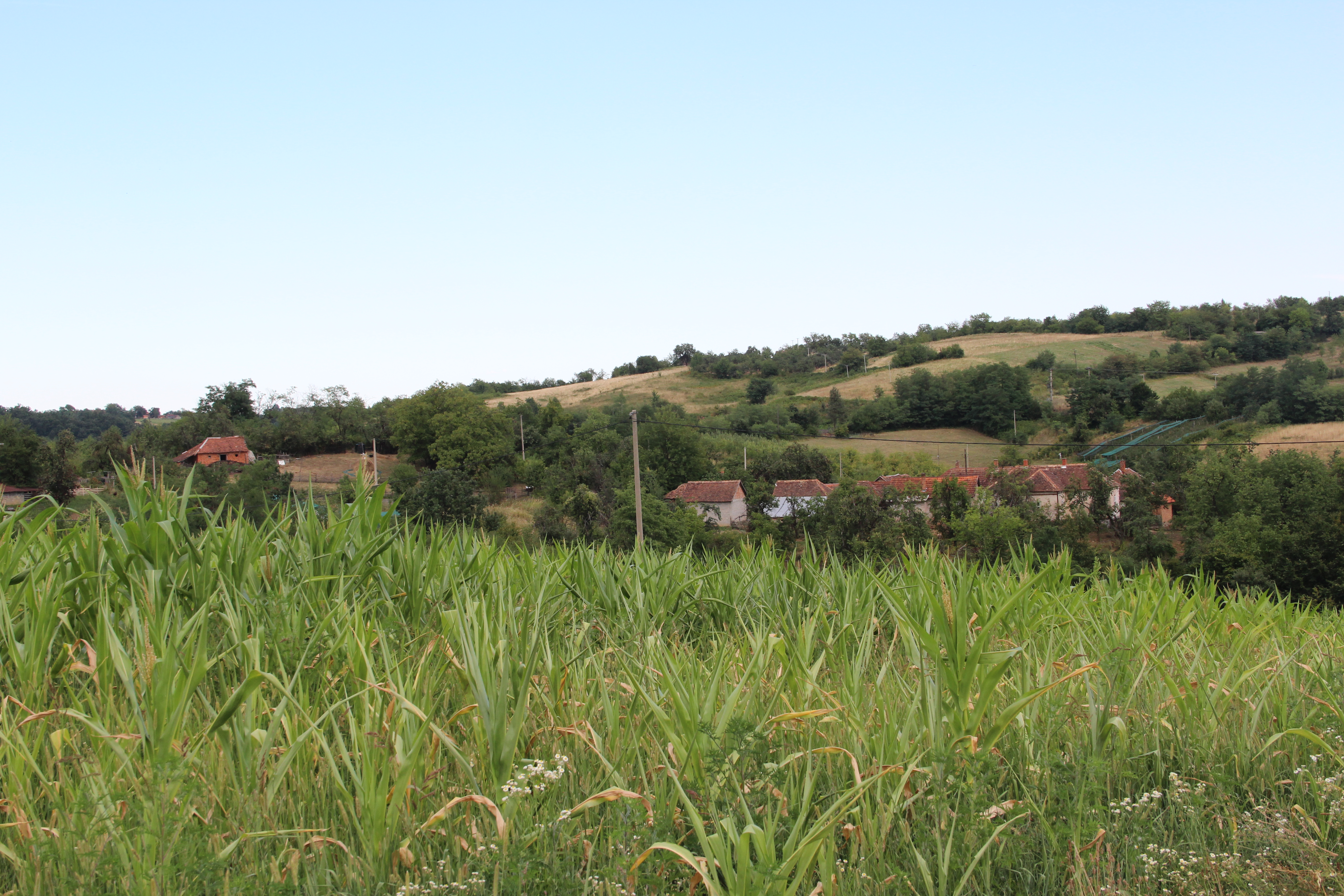
Miličinica - Panorama

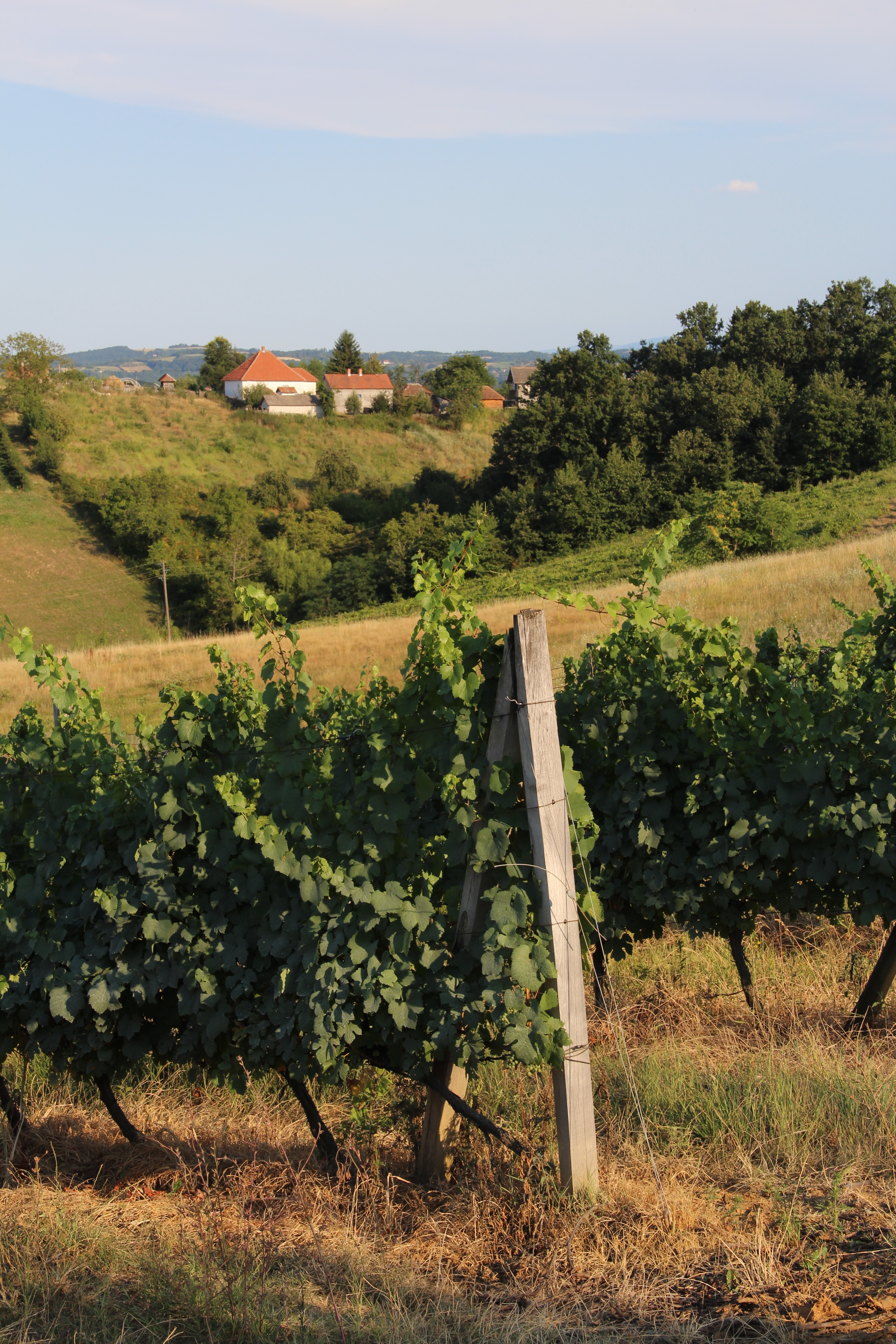
Miličinica - Panorama
