= Vlašić (Serbia) =

Mountain in Serbia

- Location within Serbia

Highest point
- Elevation: 474 m (1,555 ft)
- Coordinates: 44°22′45″N 19°48′22″E

Geography
- Location: Western Serbia
- Parent range: Dinaric Alps

Vlašić (Serbian Cyrillic: Влашић, pronounced [ʋlâʃitɕ]) is a low mountain in western Serbia, between towns of Osečina and Koceljeva. Its highest peak has an elevation of 474 meters or 1555 feet above sea level.

== See also ==
- List of mountains in Serbia
