= Sitarice =

- Village (Selo)
- Location within Serbia
- Coordinates: 44°31′N 19°53′E
- Country: Serbia
- District: Kolubara District
- Municipality: Valjevo

Population (2002)
  - Total: 178
- Time zone: UTC+1 (CET)
  - Summer (DST): UTC+2 (CEST)

Sitarice is a village in the municipality of Valjevo, Serbia. According to the 2002 census, the village has a population of 178 people.

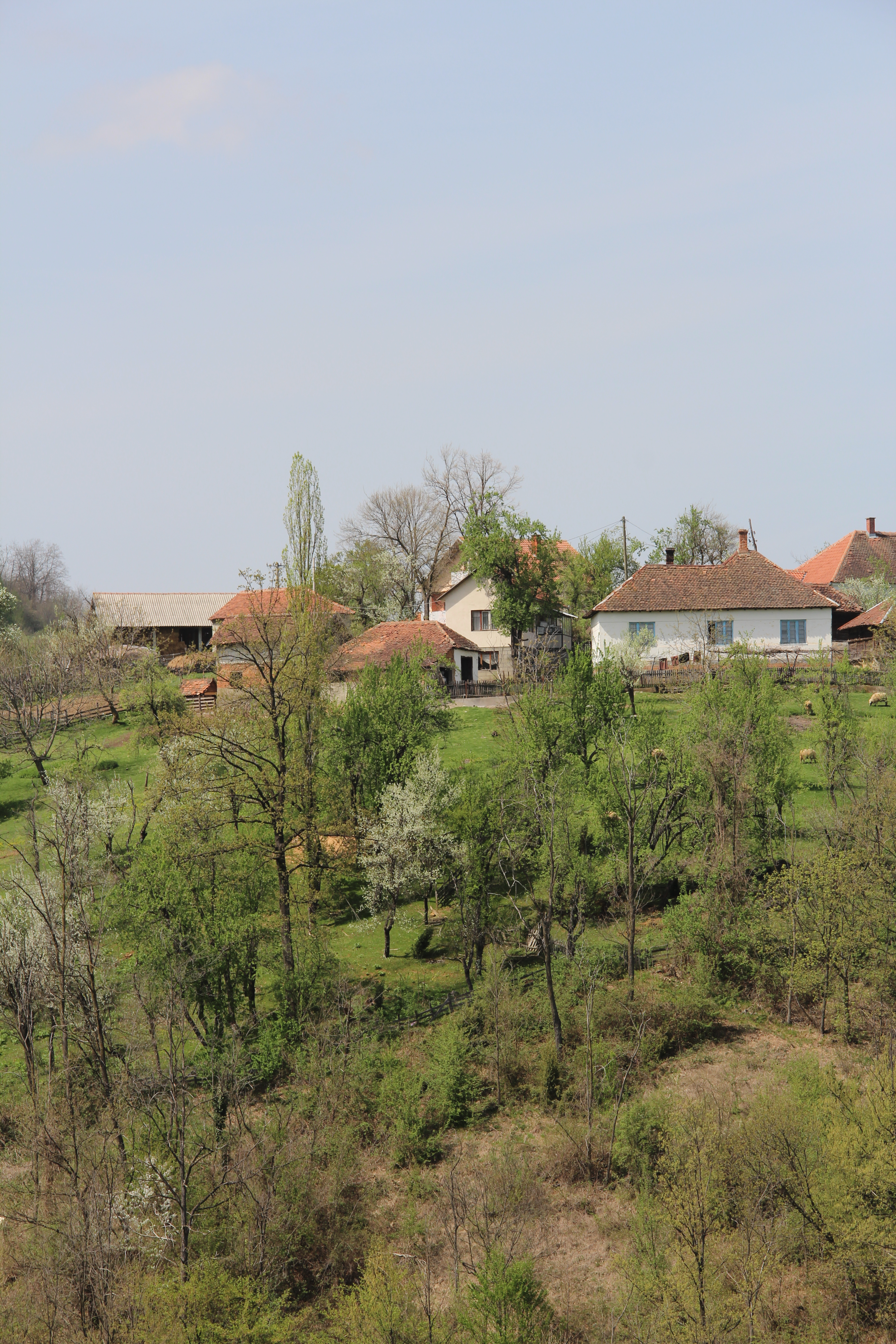
Sitarice - panorama

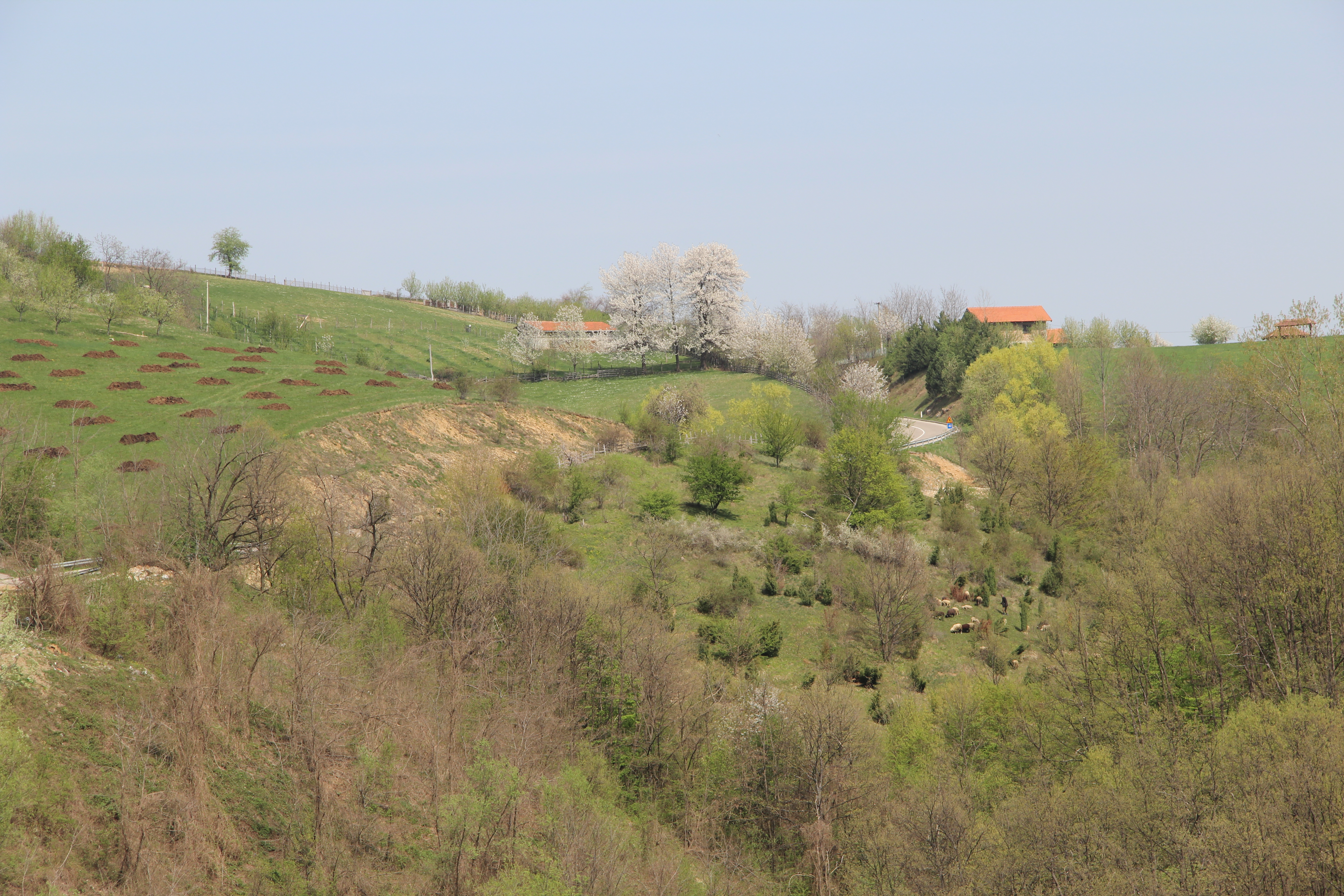
Sitarice - panorama

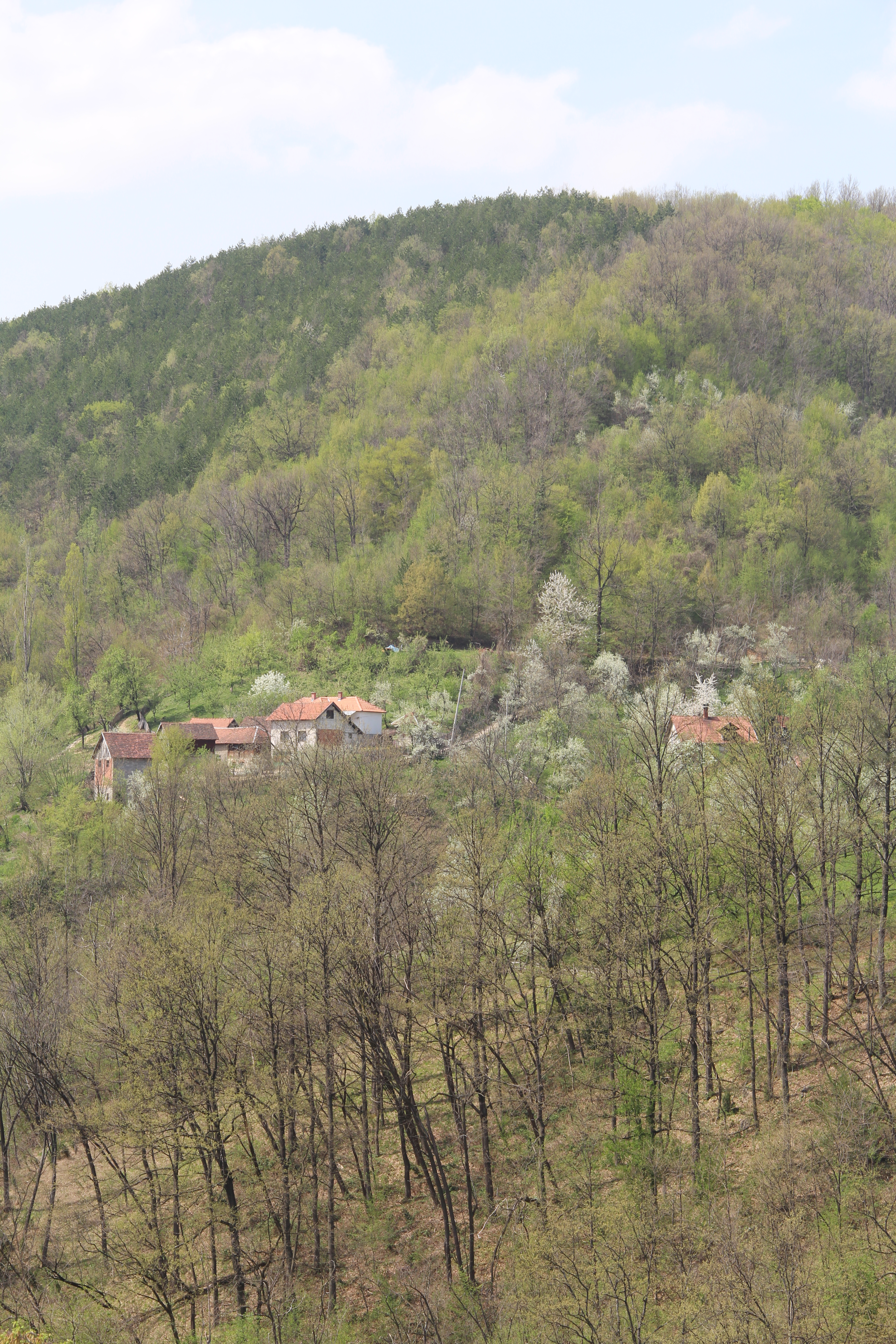
Sitarice - panorama

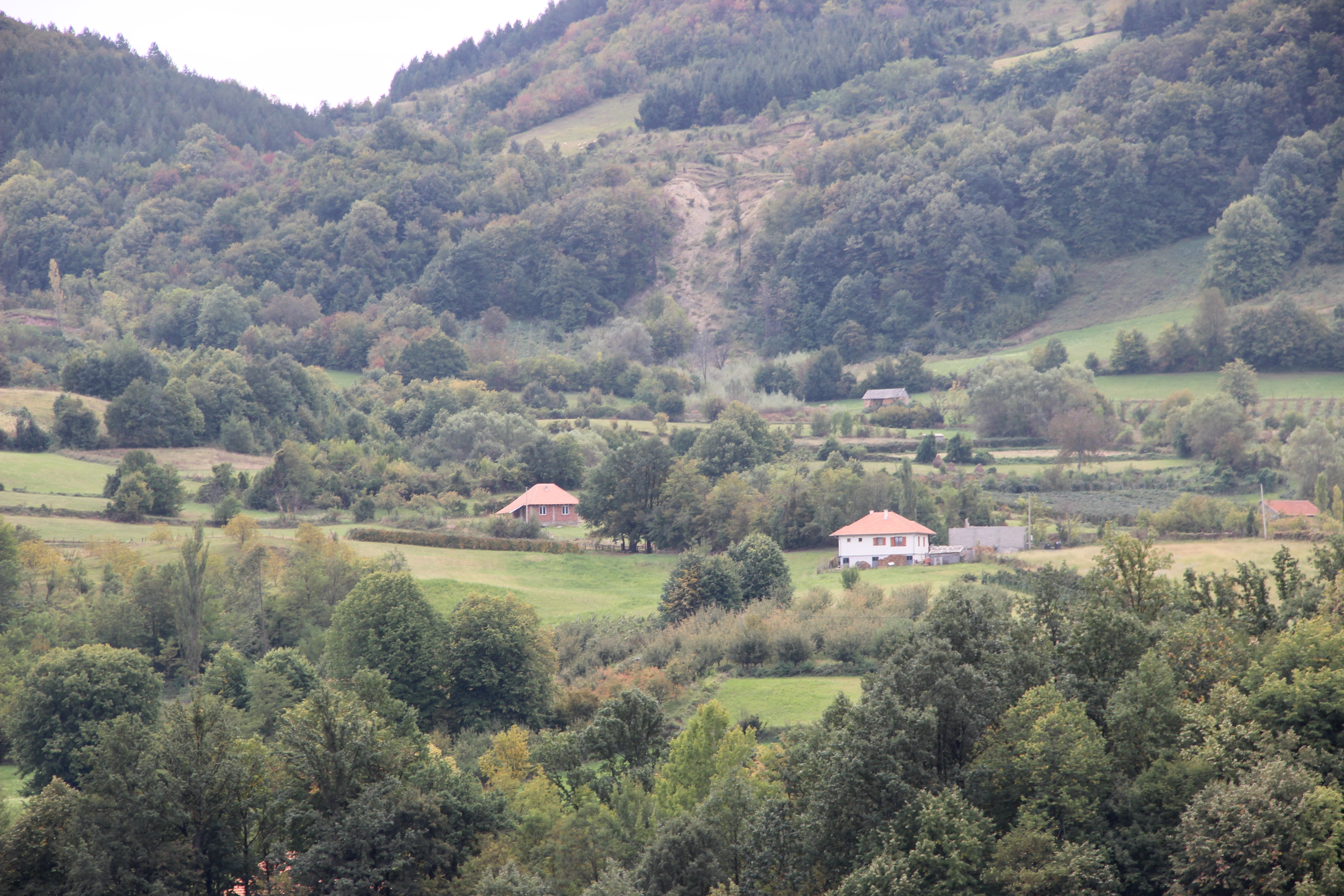
Sitarice - panorama

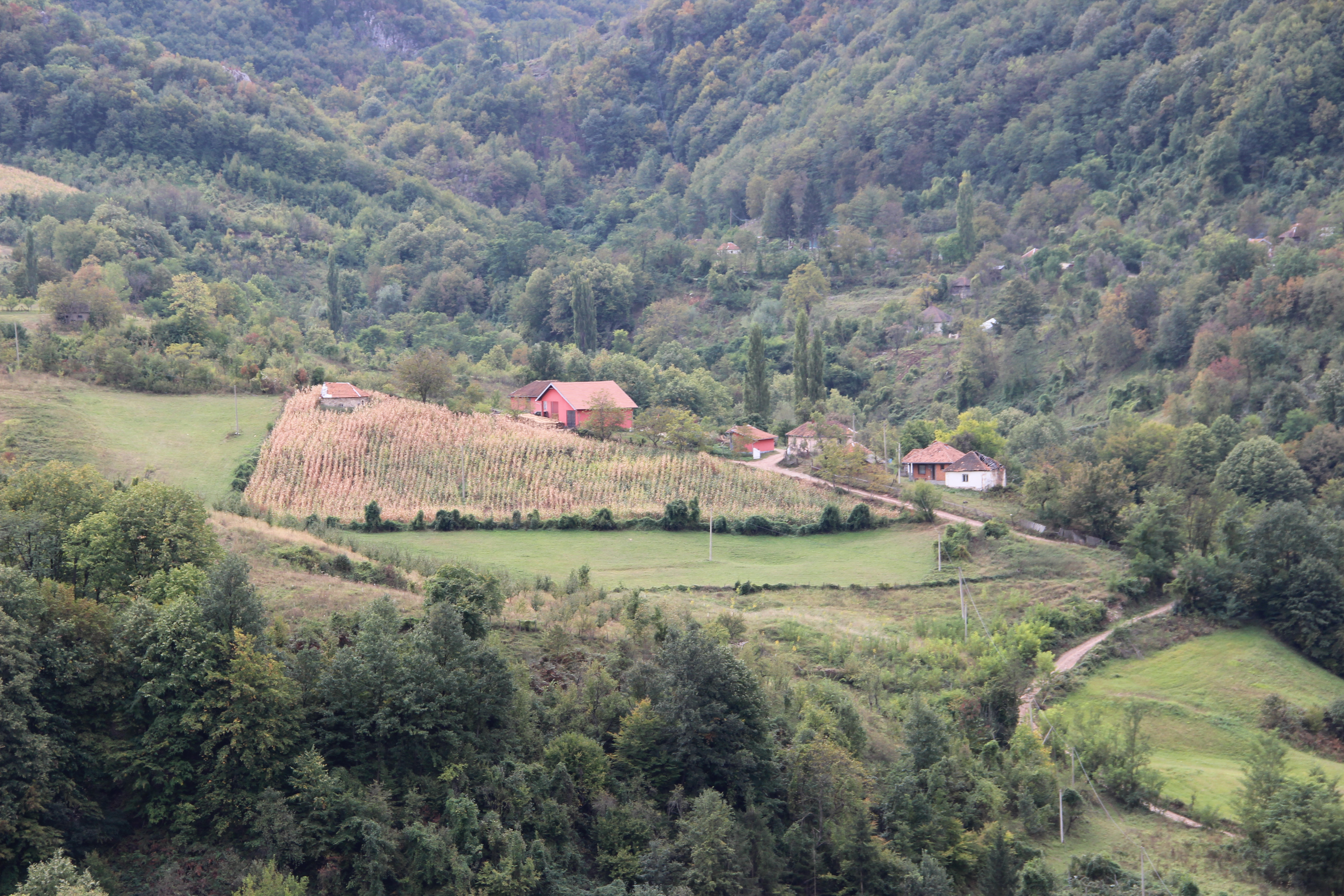
Sitarice - panorama

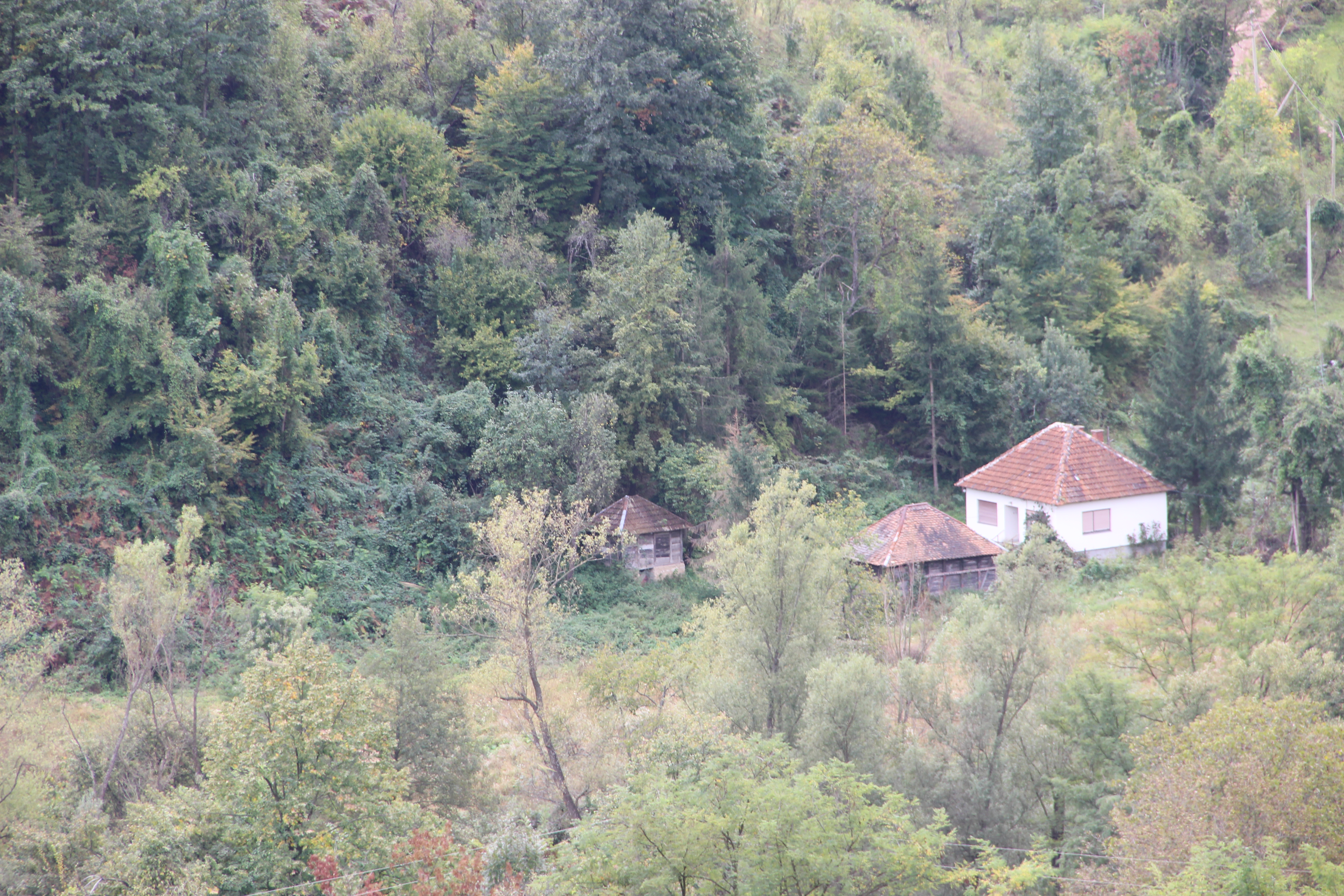
Sitarice - panorama

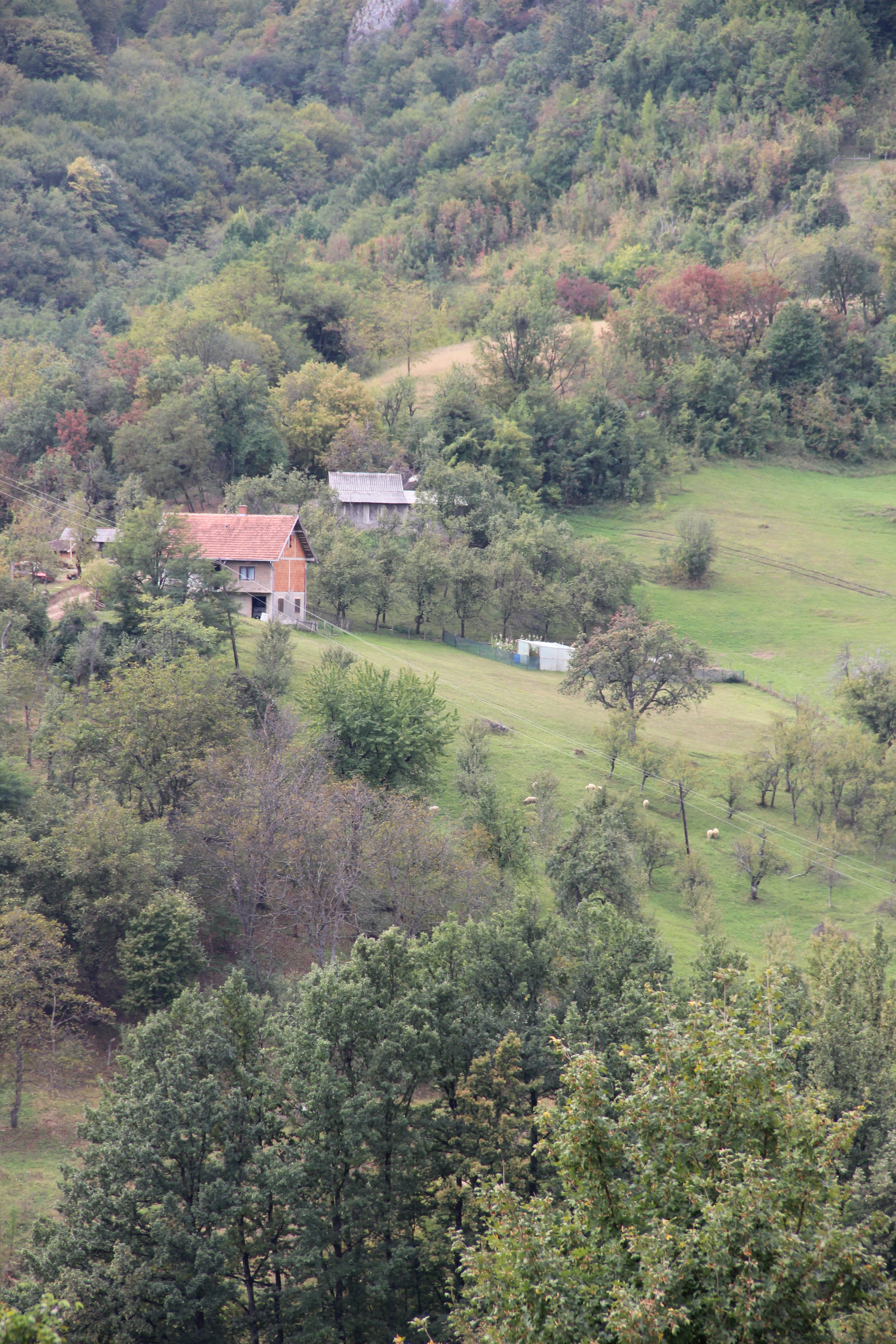
Sitarice - panorama

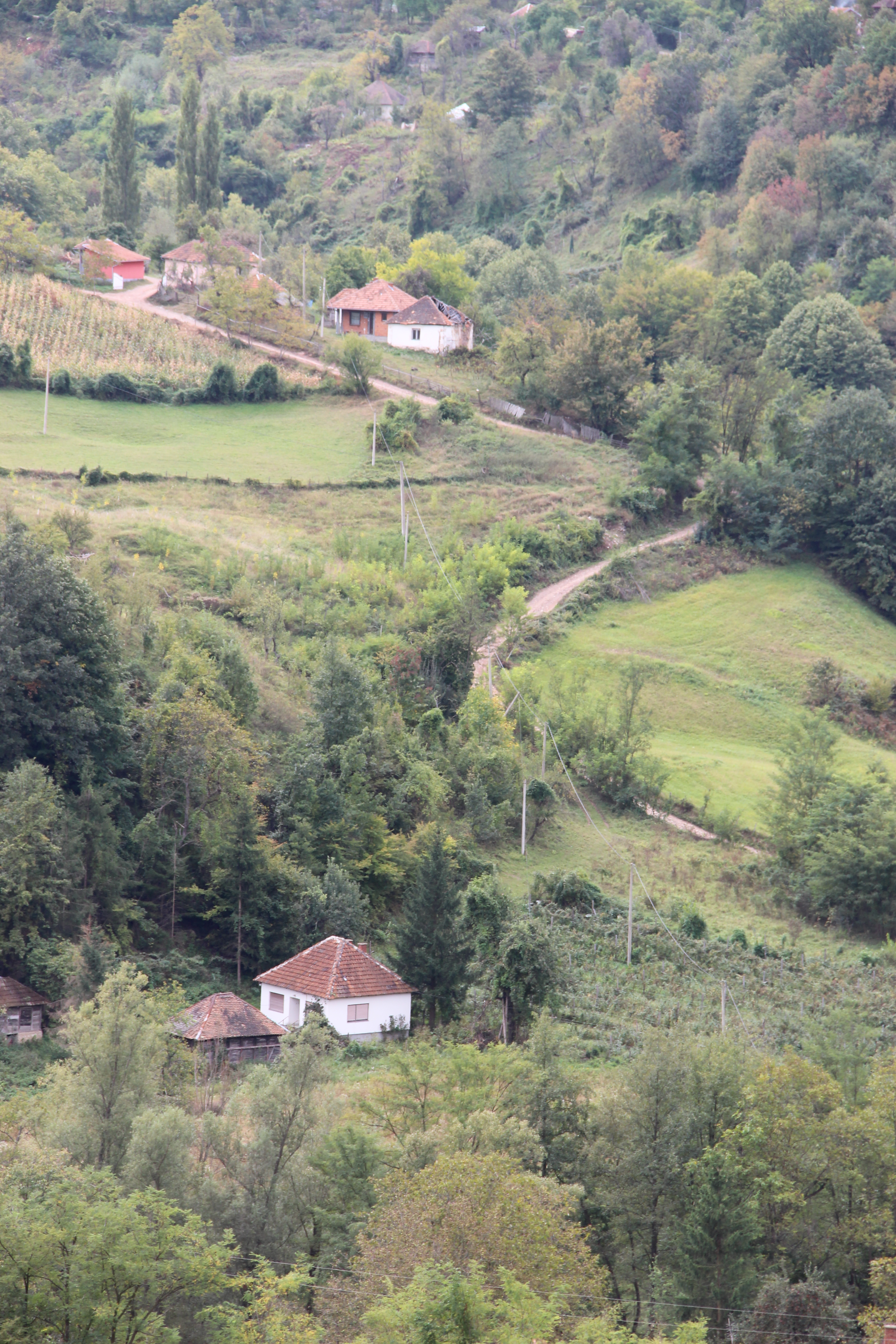
Sitarice - panorama

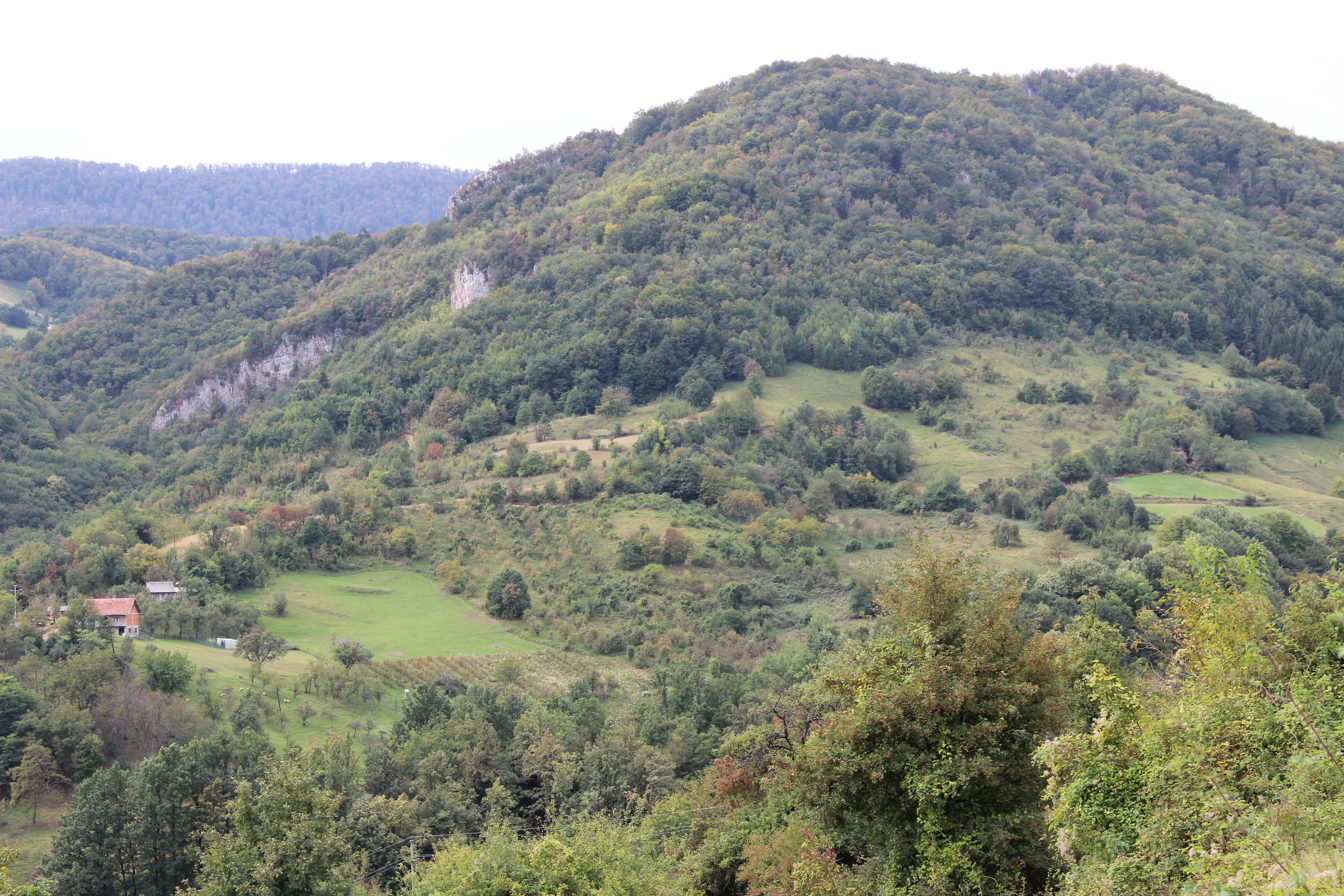
Sitarice - panorama
