= Bogatić (Valjevo) =

Bogatić Богатић
- Village
- Location within Serbia
- Coordinates: 44°11′N 19°49′E
- Country: Serbia
- District: Kolubara District
- Municipality: Valjevo

Population (2002)
  - Total: 129
- Time zone: UTC+1 (CET)
  - Summer (DST): UTC+2 (CEST)

Bogatić is a village in the municipality of Valjevo, Serbia. According to the 2002 census, the village has a population of 129 people.

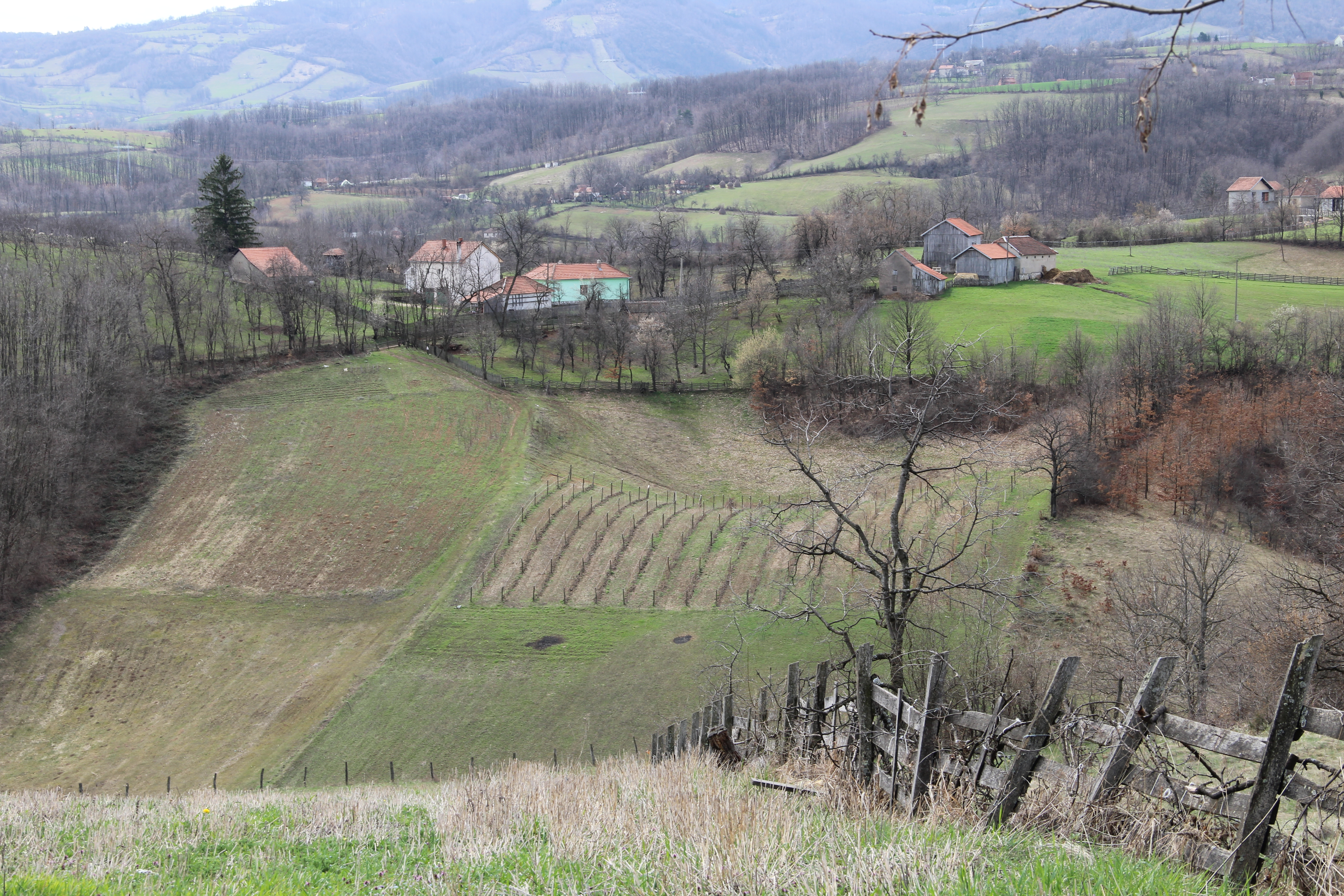
Bogatić - Panorama

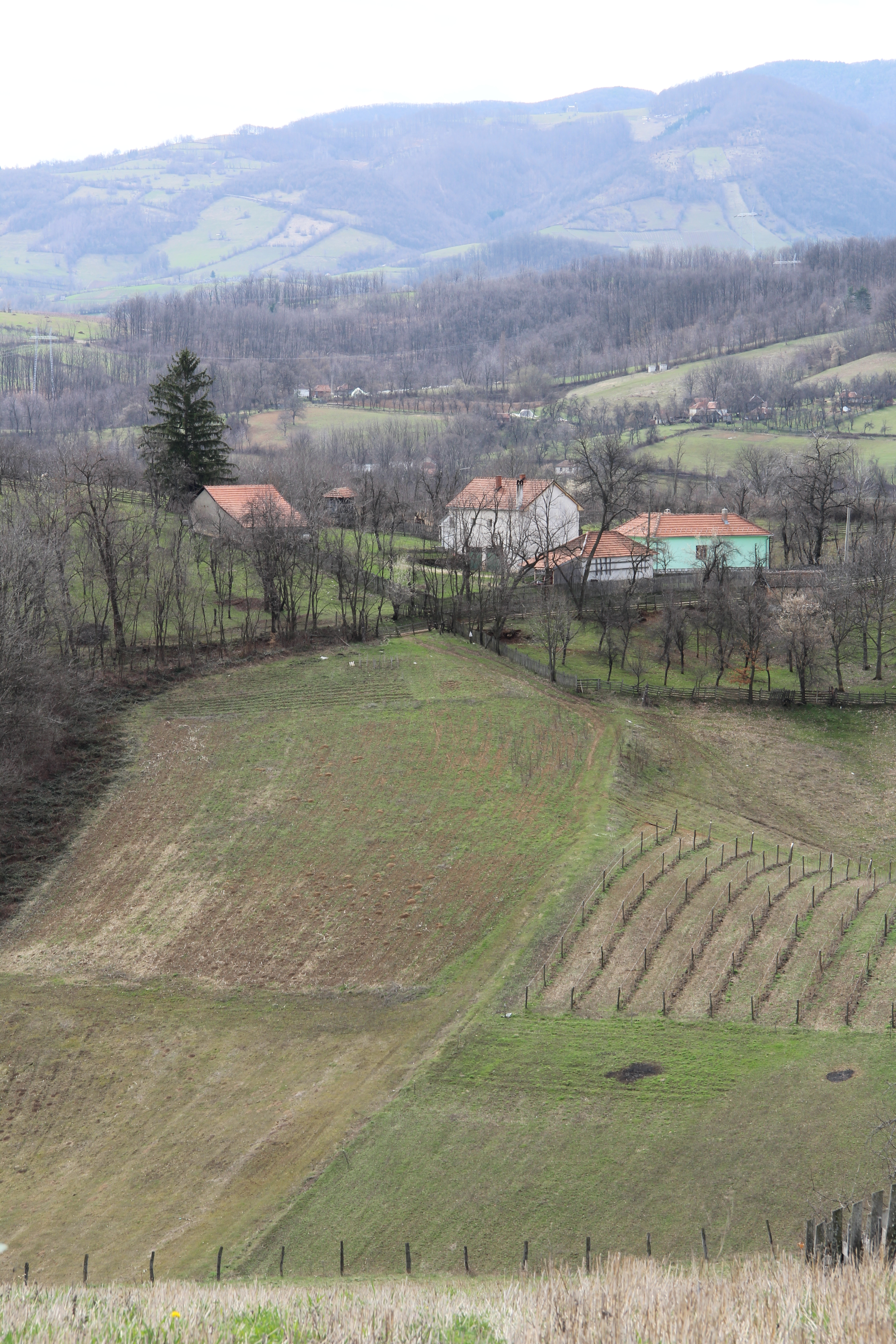
Bogatić - Panorama

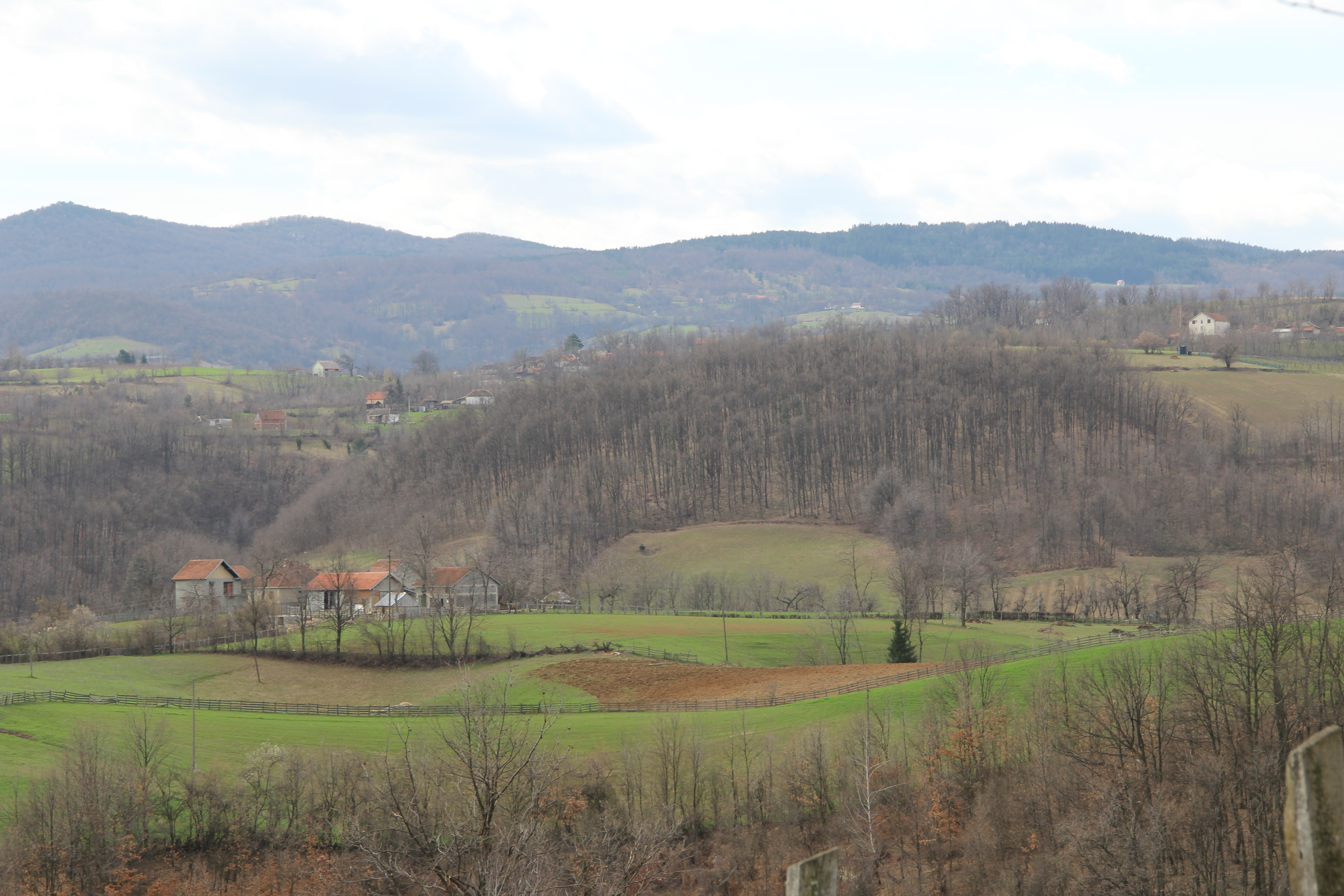
Bogatić - Panorama

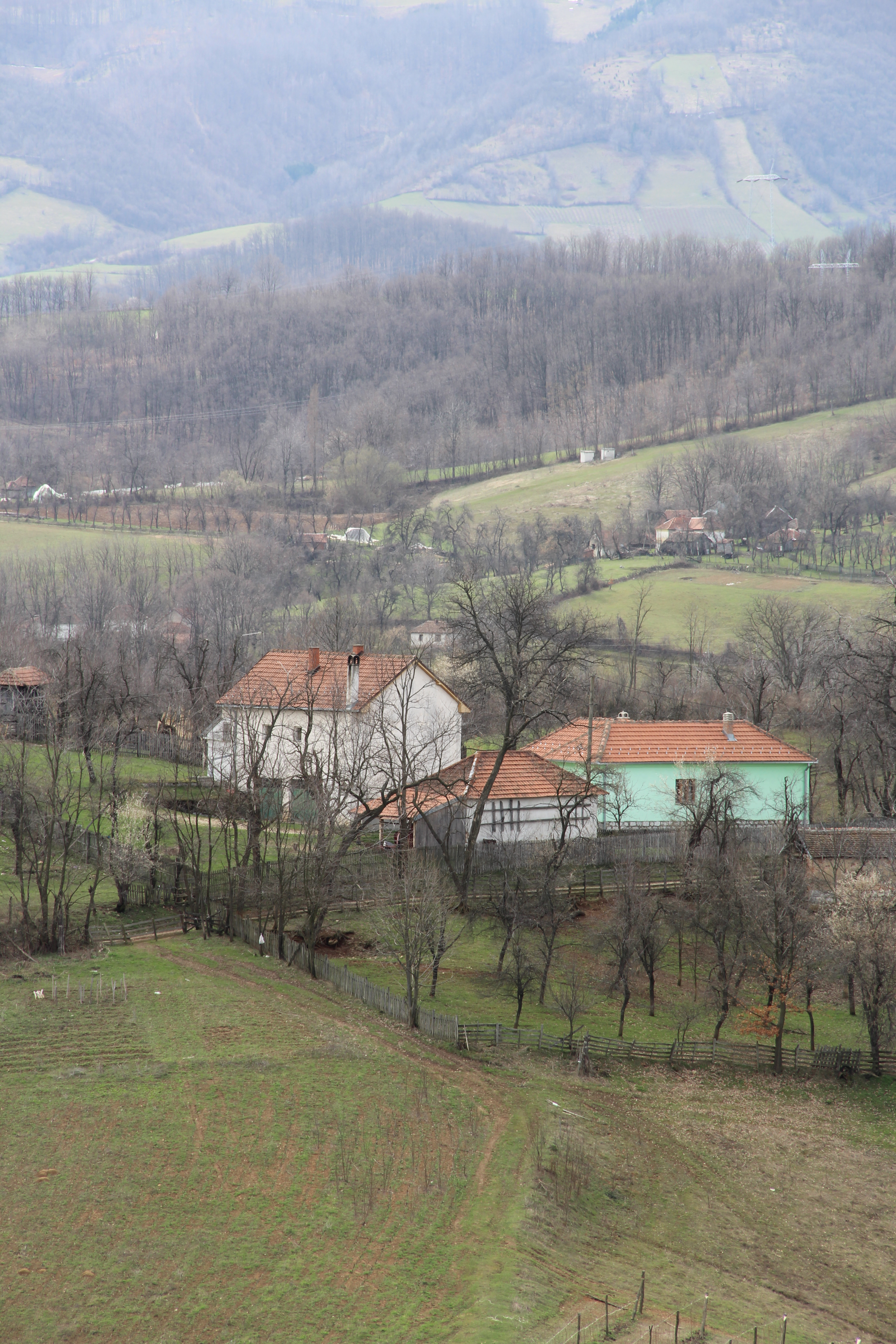
Bogatić - Panorama

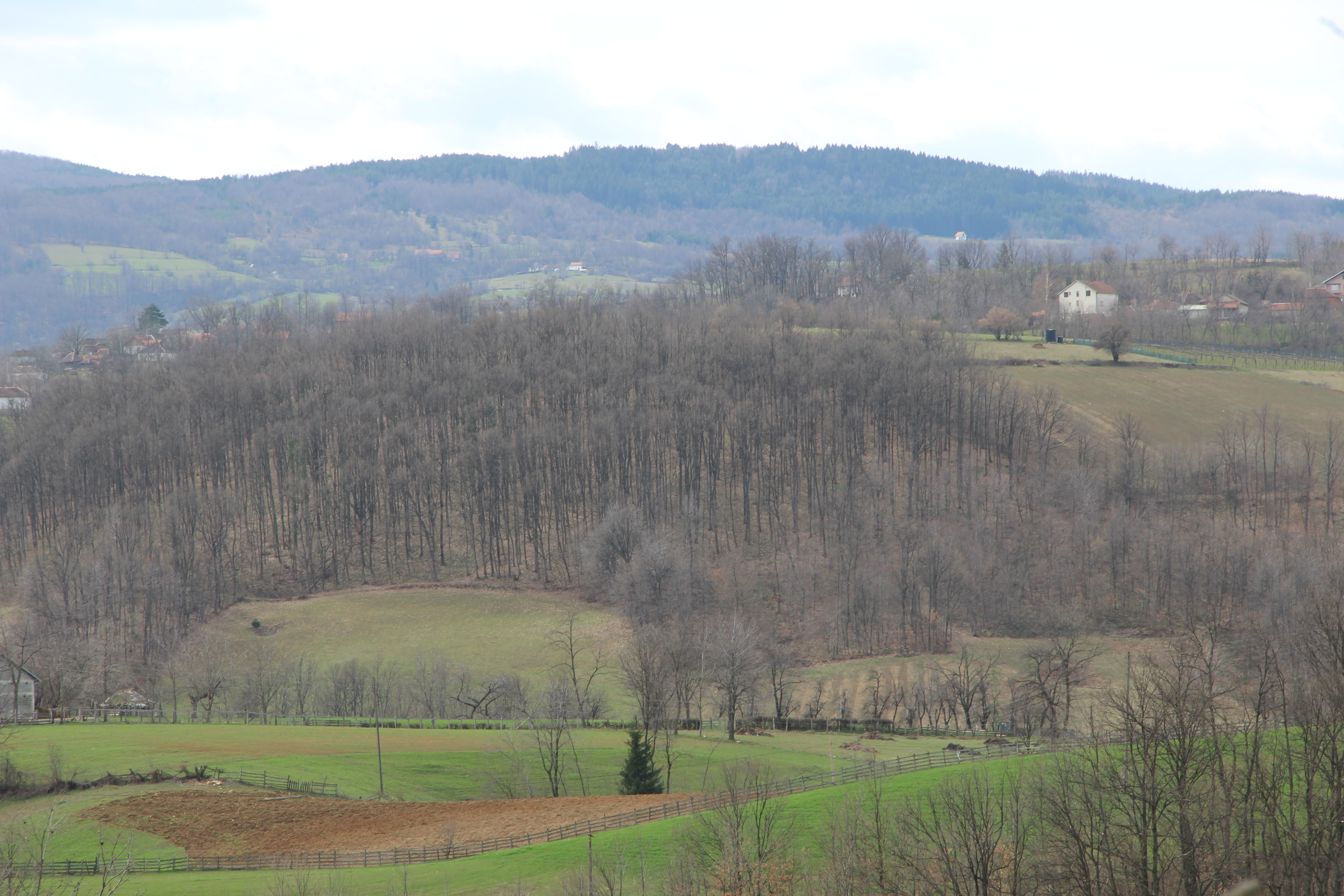
Bogatić - Panorama
