= Grabovo, Beočin =

Village in Beočin municipality, Serbia

Grabovo Грабово (Serbian)
- Village (Selo)
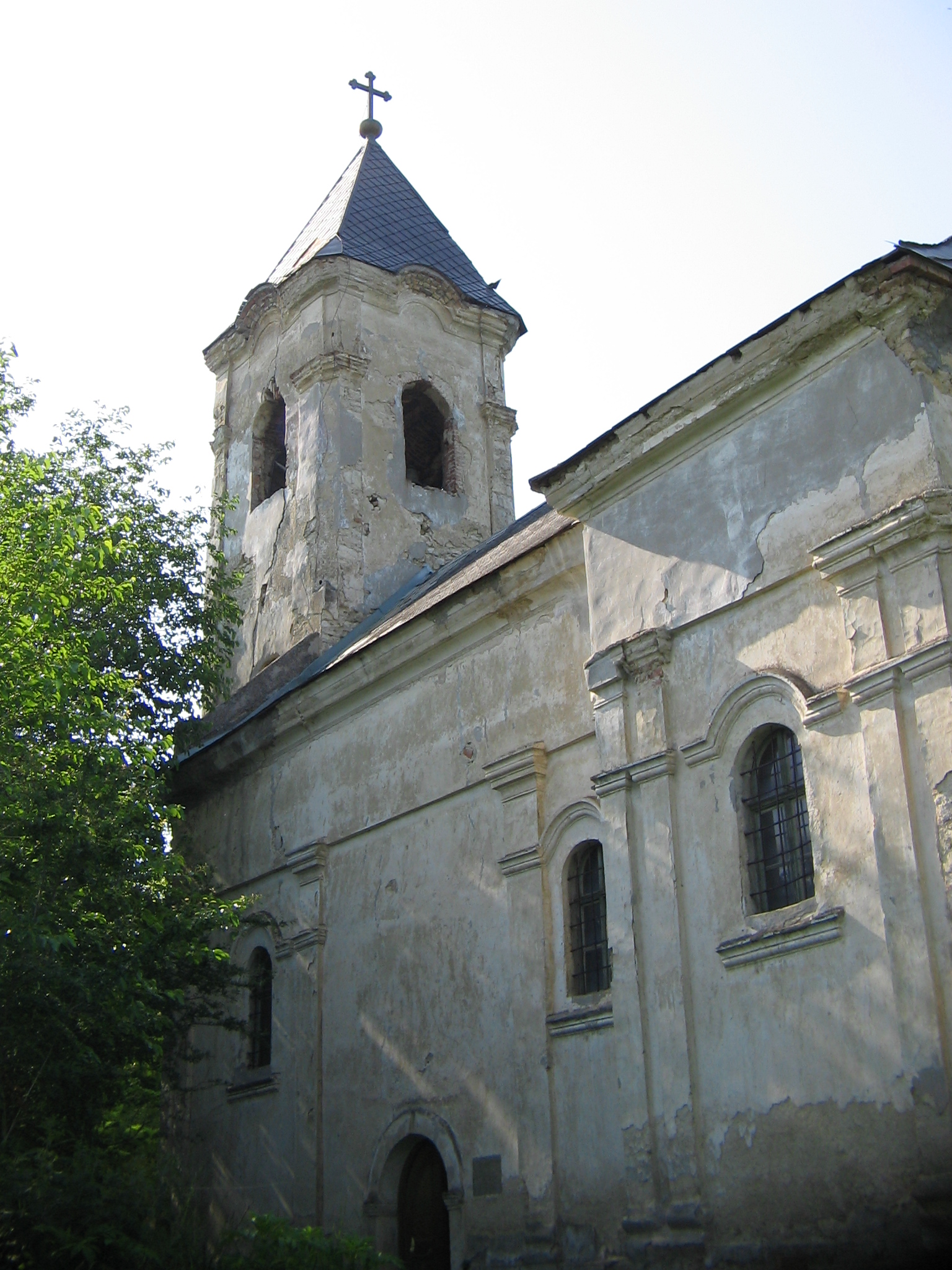
- Serbian Orthodox Church

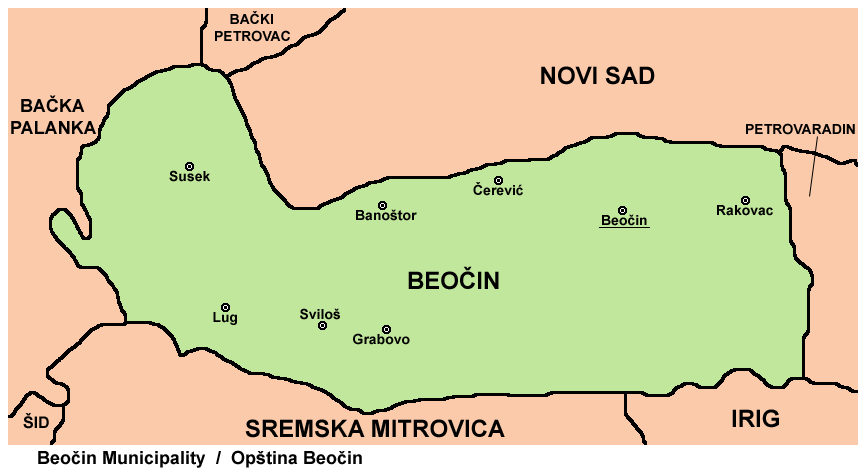
- Map of the Beočin municipality, showing the location of Grabovo

- Location within Vojvodina Location within Serbia Location within Europe
- Country: Serbia
- Province: Vojvodina
- Region: Syrmia (Podunavlje)
- District: South Bačka
- Municipality: Beočin

Population (2022)
  - Total: 65
- Time zone: UTC+1 (CET)
  - Summer (DST): UTC+2 (CEST)

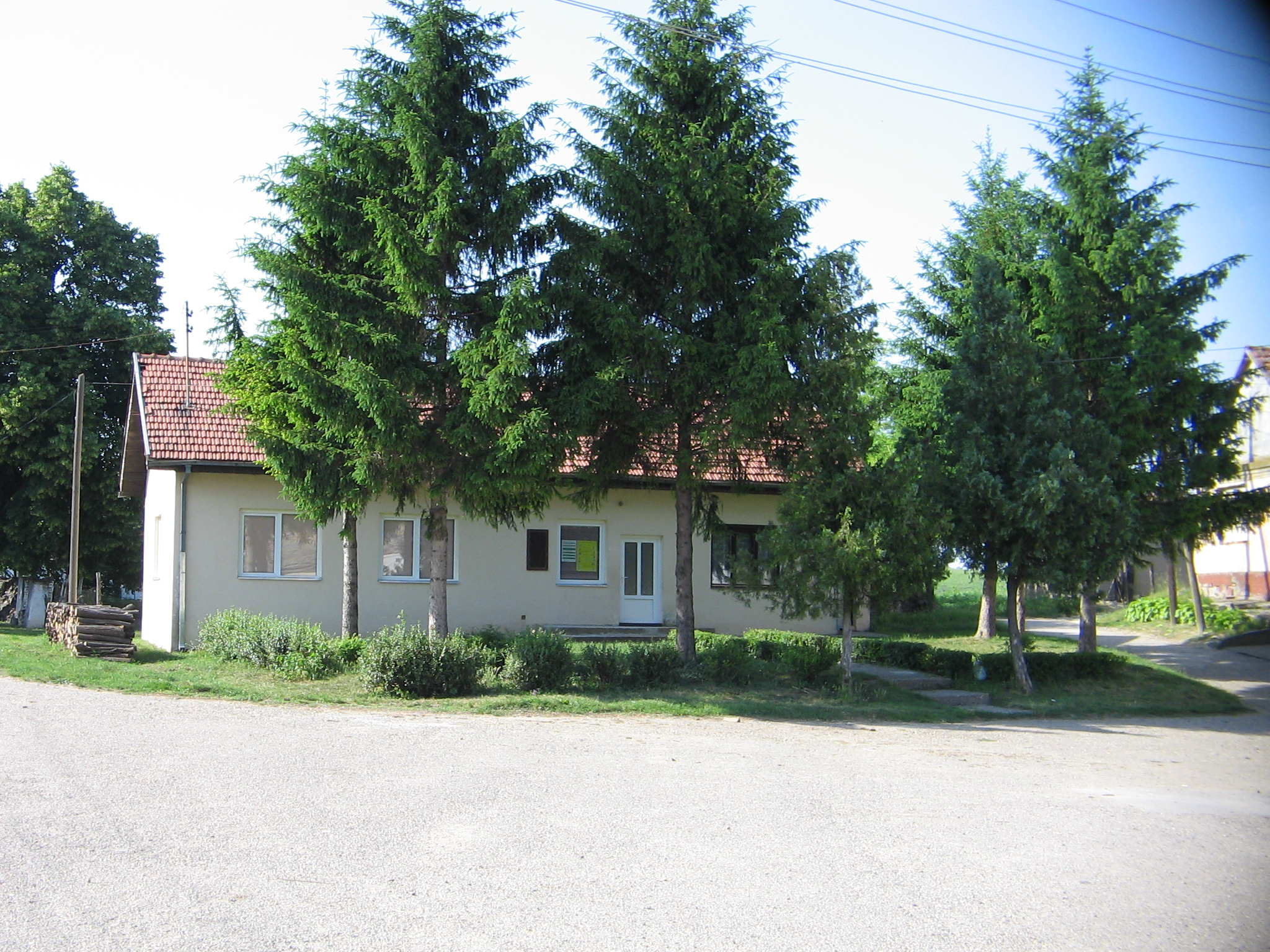
Main square in the village.

Grabovo (Serbian Cyrillic: Грабово) is a village in Serbia. It is situated in the Beočin municipality, in the Vojvodina province. Although, the village is geographically located in Syrmia, it is part of the South Bačka District. The village has a Serb ethnic majority. The population of the village, numbering 65 people according to a 2022 census, is steadily declining and the village is in danger of disappearing.

== Location ==
The village is located on the northern part of Fruška Gora mountain. It has only one asphalt road: to Sviloš in the west, across the hill, approximately 2 km (1.2 mi); and two dirt roads to Banoštor in the north, next to the Tekeniš stream. Grabovo is approximately 220–280 m (720–920 ft) above sea level.

Grabovo is one of the most isolated villages in Beočin municipality, and also in the region. Bus No.84 connects the villages of Grabovo and Sviloš to Lug, Beočin and Novi Sad; it operates only on work days: three times a day to Grabovo (from Novi Sad via Beočin), and once a day from Grabovo.

== History ==
Following Ottoman retreat from the region, the Lordship of Ilok and Upper Syrmia was established, and the village became part of its domain.

During the Axis occupation in World War II, 151 civilians were killed in Grabovo by fascists.

== Historical population ==
- 1961: 219
- 1971: 174
- 1981: 162
- 1991: 142
- 2002: 138
- 2011: 100
- 2022: 65

== Features ==
Village has one Serbian Orthodox Church, which is in ruins. It also has a small ambulance, a small tavern, and a grocery store.

== See also ==
- List of places in Serbia
- List of cities, towns and villages in Vojvodina
