= Lordship of Ilok and Upper Syrmia =

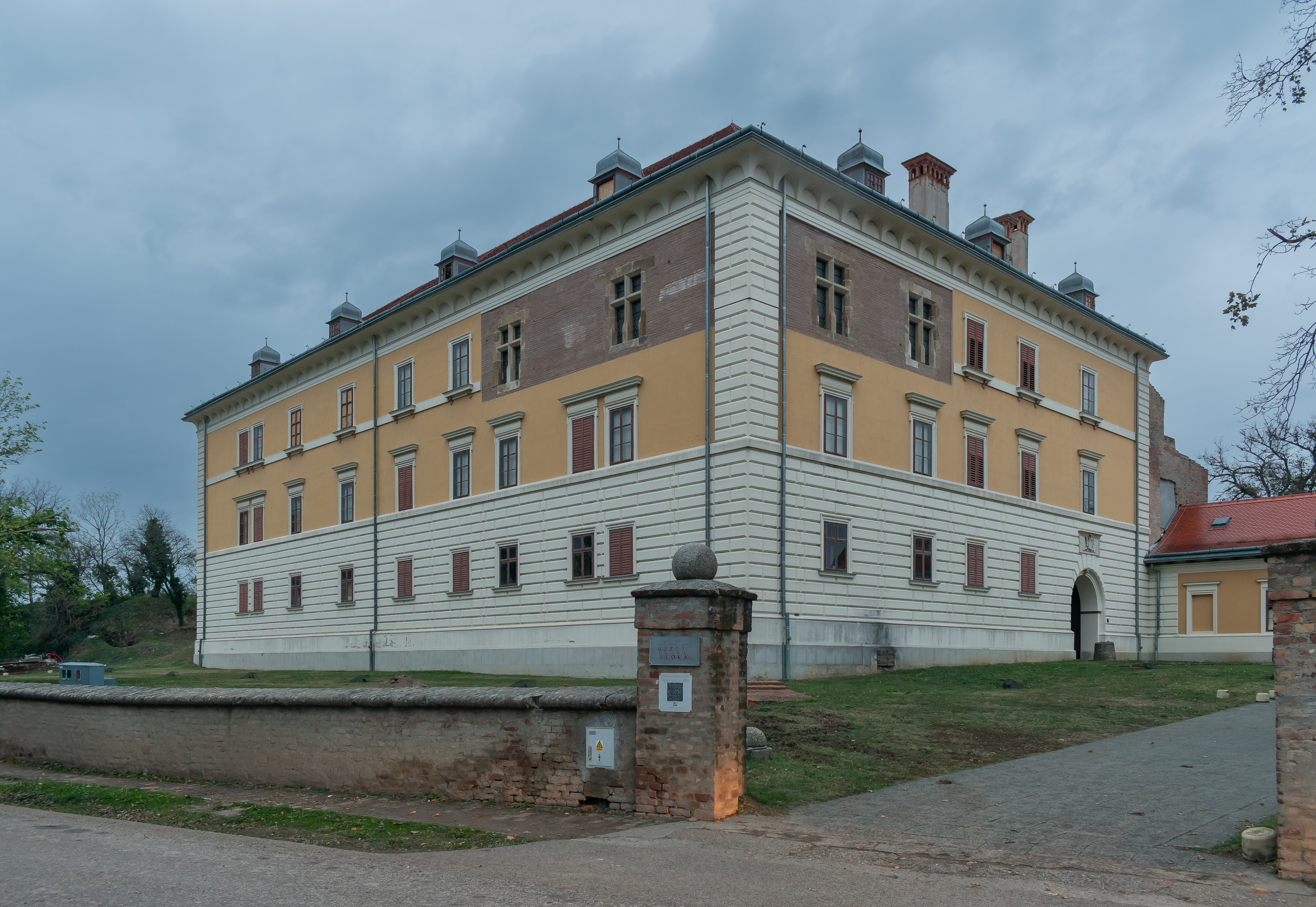
Odescalchi Palace in Ilok

The Lordship of Ilok and Upper Syrmia (German: Herrschaft Illok, Italian: Signoria di Ilok e della Sirmia Superiore, Serbo-Croatian: Iločko vlastelinstvo, Илочко властелинство) was a large land estate, lordship, nominally established in the Kingdom of Slavonia in 1697, in the final stages of the liberation of the region from the Ottoman rule concluded with the 1699 Treaty of Karlowitz. It covered the area and settlements in and around the town of Ilok in modern day Croatia and in Serbia.

Alongside Ilok, it included land and villages of Molovin, Sot, Pakledin, Ljuba, Susek, Sviloš, Grabovo, Ležimir, Bingula, Laćarak, Martinci, Kuzmin, Bačinci, Erdevik, Divoš and Remeta. Feudal lordships in Slavonia covered areas which were not part of the Slavonian Military Frontier, royal free city or under direct royal or eclestical rule.

== History ==
The 1687 Battle of Mohács opened the space to the Habsburg Empire forces to reconquest areas in Slavonia and Syrmia from the Ottoman Empire with 10 years of fighting in the areas between Vukovar and Ilok which led to almost complete depopulation of the region until 1699. In 1697, during the Great Turkish War, Leopold I granted the Ilok estate to Livio Odescalchi in return for 325,000 forints to support the war effort, effectively constituting a purchase. Odescalchi was a relative of Pope Innocent XI and one of pretenders for Polish crown. The grant to Odescalchi conferred broad quasi-sovereign rights, including full judicial authority, administrative control over taxation and regalian privileges such as minting coin and founding markets. He also enjoyed extensive legal immunity, being subject only to the emperor. Issued during wartime uncertainty and formalized before the Treaty of Karlowitz, these privileges proved difficult to implement in practice and became a source of prolonged conflict with Habsburg chamber authorities. The grant also explicitly excluded key Petrovaradin Fortress, Slankamen Fortress, and Zemun Fortress from the estate.

After the Habsburg victory at the Battle of Zenta, Odescalchi was formally introduced into possession by Ferdinand Karl von Caraffa on 16 March 1698 through his representative. The takeover was conducted through his representative, Bonini, in a ceremony attended by both Roman Catholic and Eastern Orthodox clergy as well as the local population. This was not the first time Bonini visited Ilok as he travelled to the town while it was still important centre of the Ottoman Sanjak of Syrmia and described it as beautiful settlement. As the city suffered heavy destruction during the war today there are only a couple of Ottoman monuments of Ilok left. The new Ilok estate was centred on the Castle of Ilok, a fortified complex originally constructed in the late fifteenth century by Nicholas of Ilok in a transitional Gothic-Renaissance style. The castle fell into disrepair during the period of Ottoman rule over Ilok. Administration of the new estate was entrusted to Bartholomeo Grossi, and the territory was organized into Upper and Lower Syrmia. The present-day castle was rebuilt between the 18th and 19th centuries and incorporates parts of the walls of the earlier medieval fortress.

Following Odescalchi’s death without heirs, the estate reverted to the crown, prompting a dispute between Grossi and the chamber official Peter Antoni Walter. Accusations of mismanagement accompanied the conflict until Joseph I allowed Grossi to retain temporary control pending transfer to Baldassare Odescalchi. During the Russo-Turkish War of 1787–1792 some 900 villagers of the lordship were regrouted from all settlements except Irig. During the Napoleonic Wars (1803–1815), the Lordship of Ilok experienced an expansion of grain production and trade, accompanied by the growth of farming based on increased exploitation of serf labour. Shortly before the Second World War, the princes transferred their library and part of their artistic heritage to Rome. The Odescalchi family retained both the castle and the wider estate until December 1944, when their properties were confiscated in the context of post-war nationalisation. Since 1969, the Odescalchi Castle has housed the Municipal Museum of Ilok.

== Gallery ==
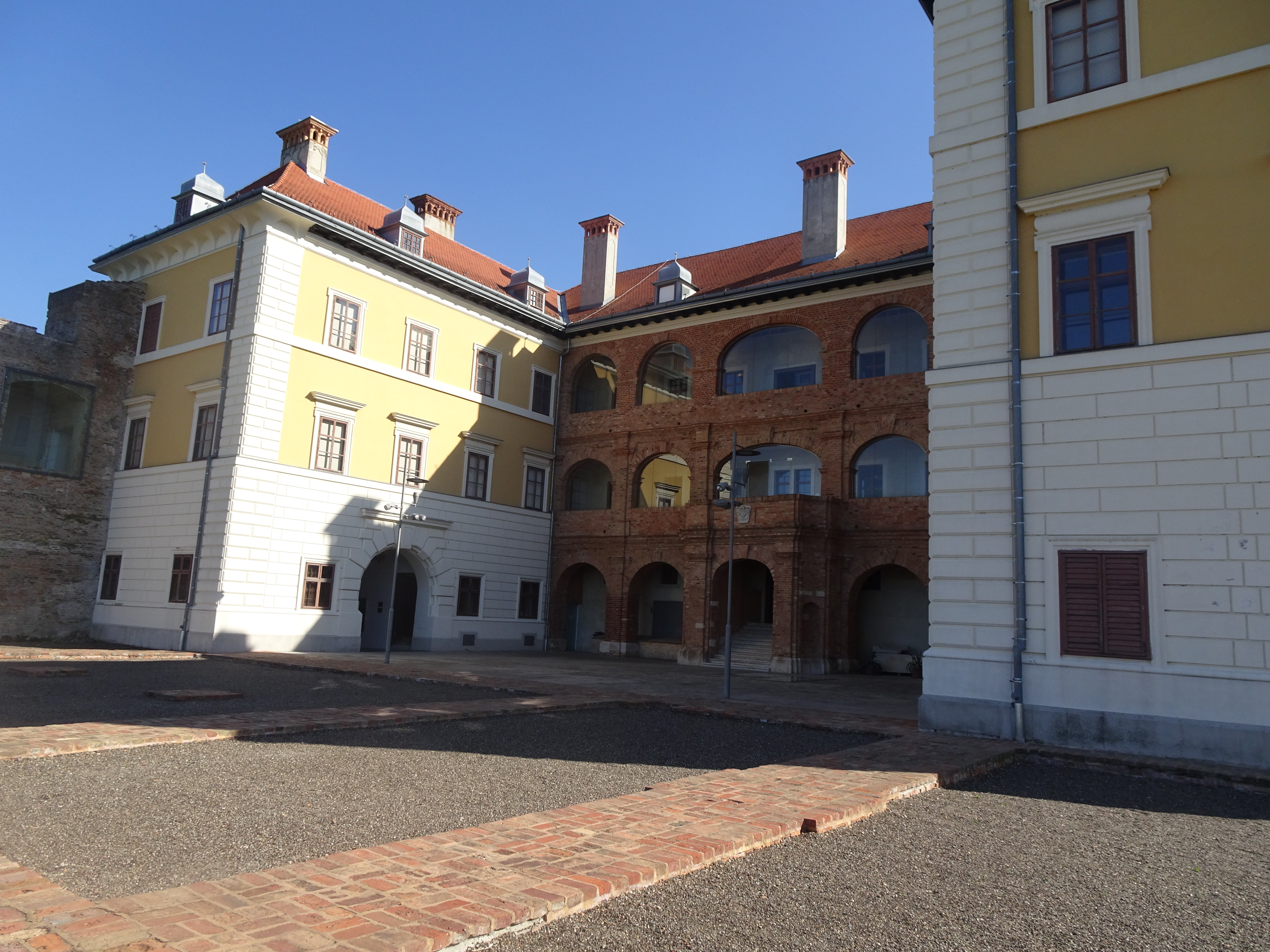
Danube side of the Odescalchi Palace

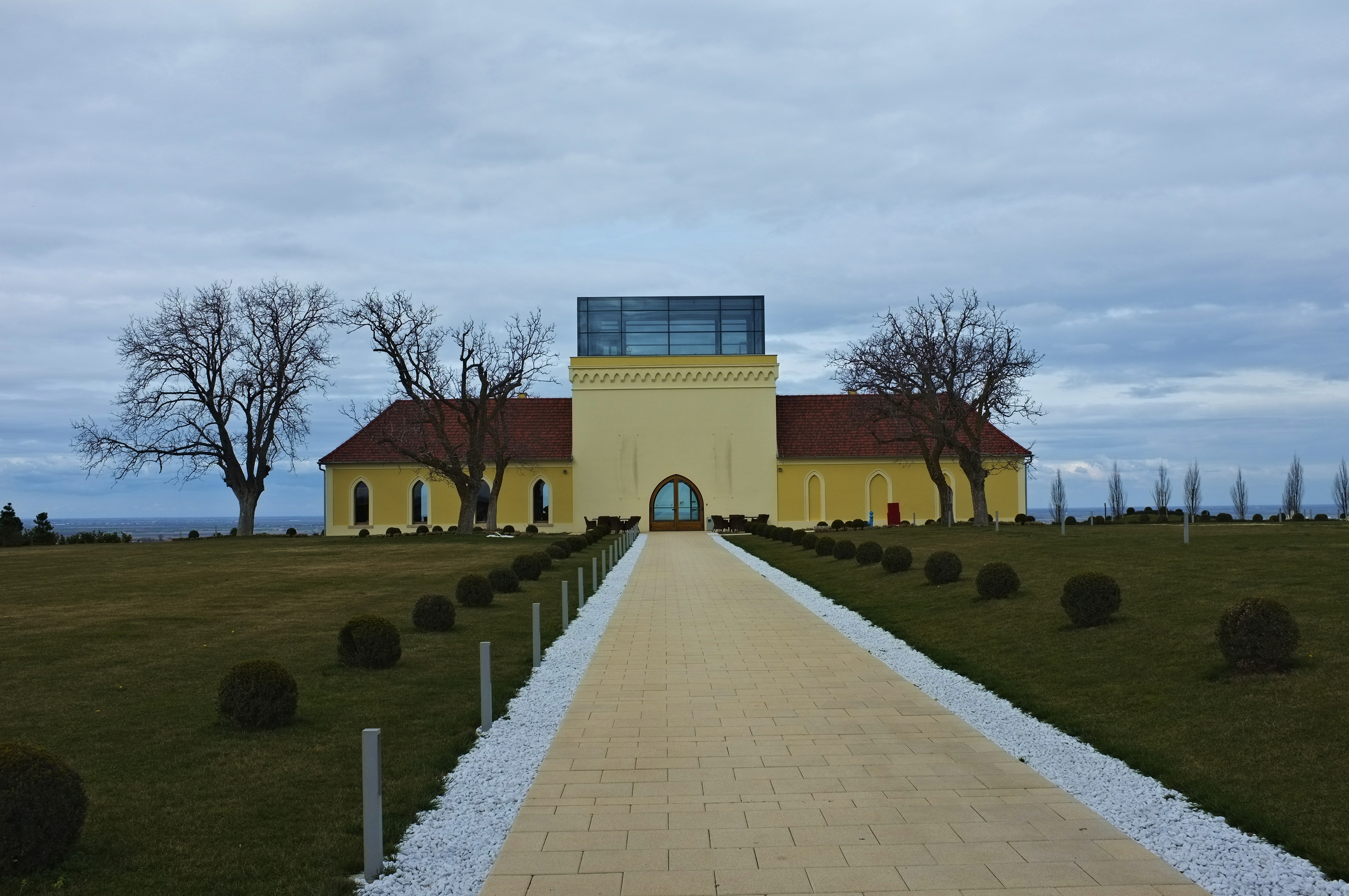
Principovac Vineyard Palace

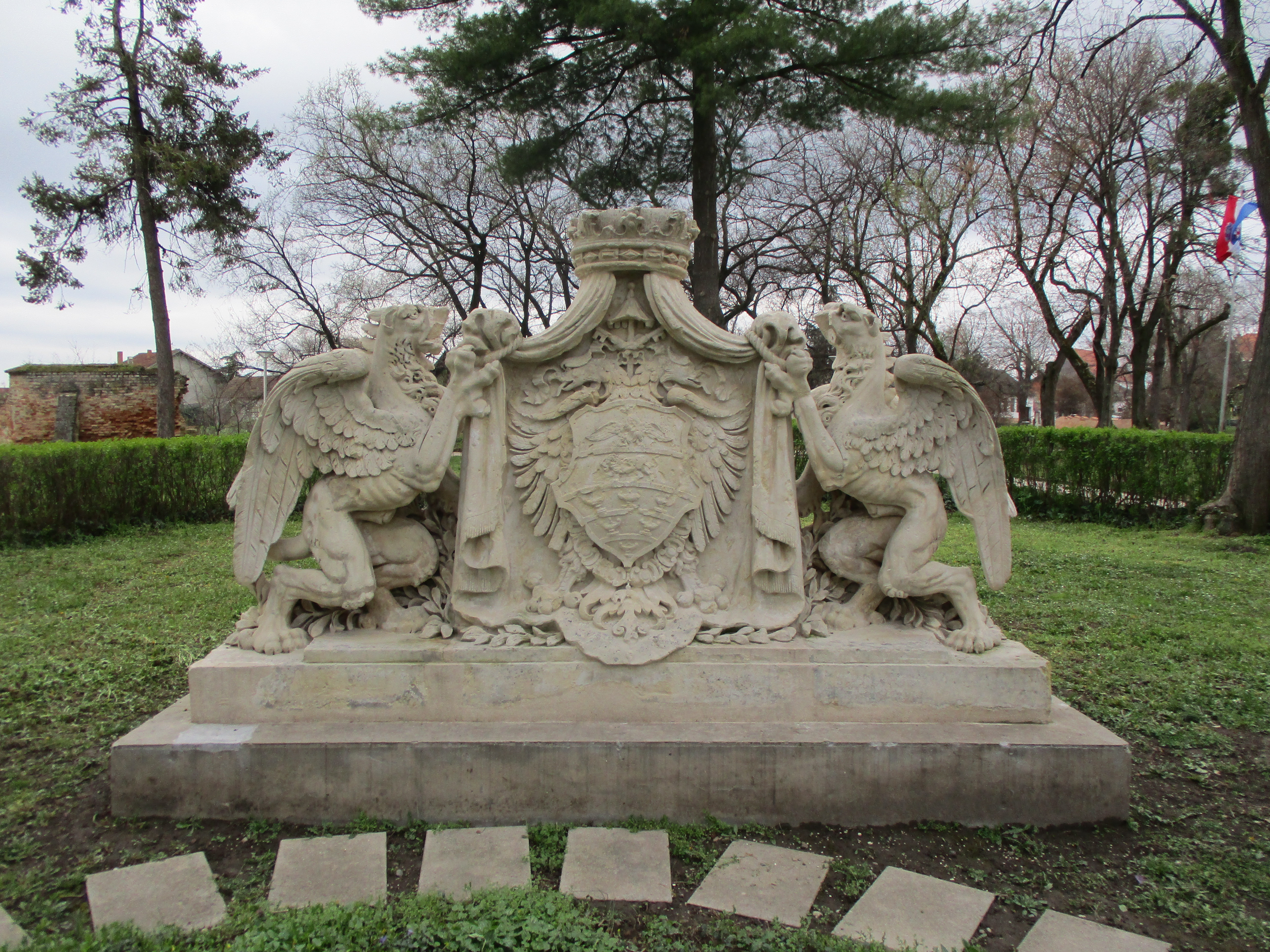
Coat of arms of the House of Odescalchi

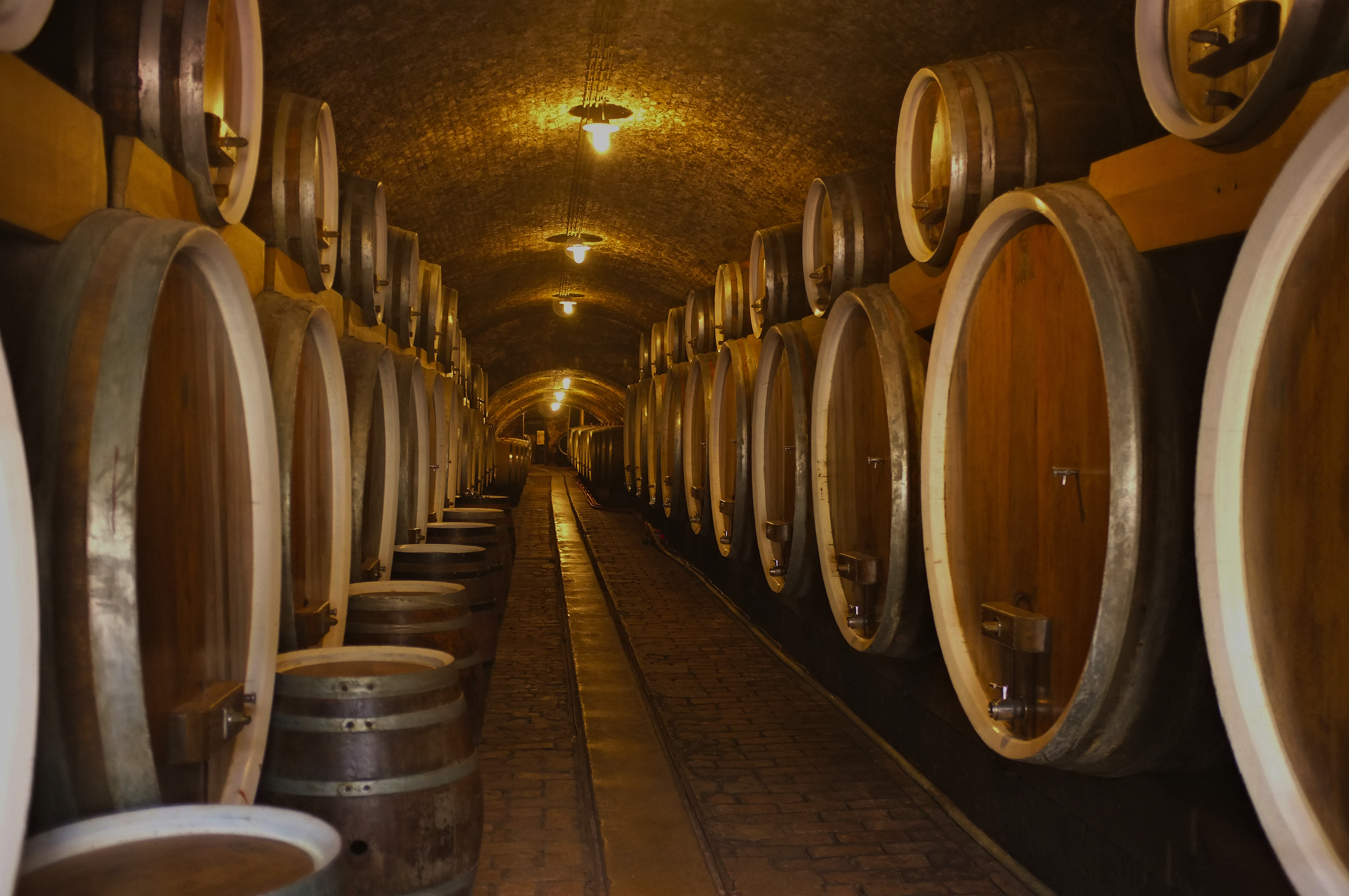
Vinery basement

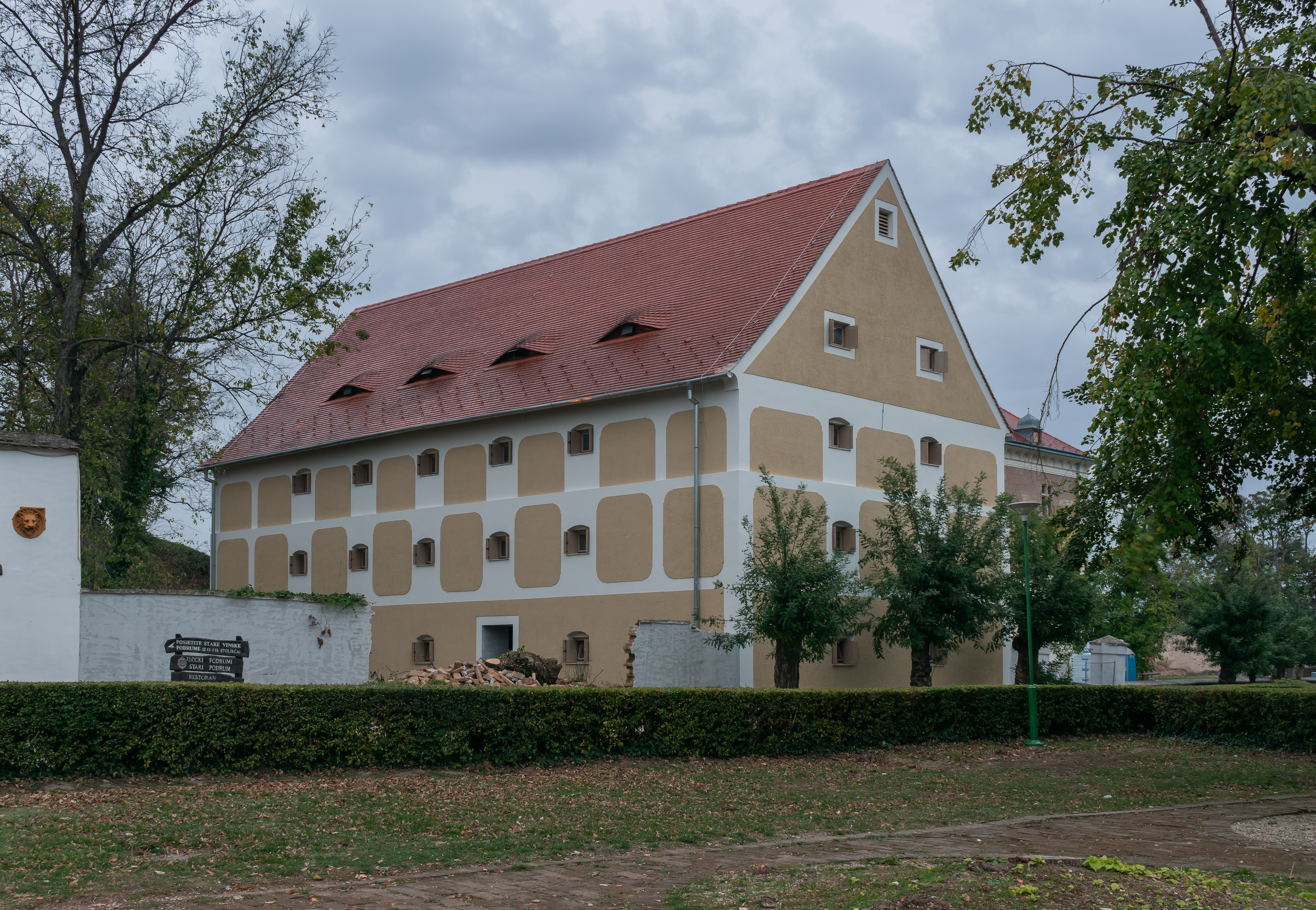
Granary

== See also ==
- Lordship of Vukovar
- Lordship of Nuštar
- Syrmia County
- Újlaki family
