= Bingula =

Bingula Бингула (Serbian) Binguľa (Slovak)
- Village (Selo)
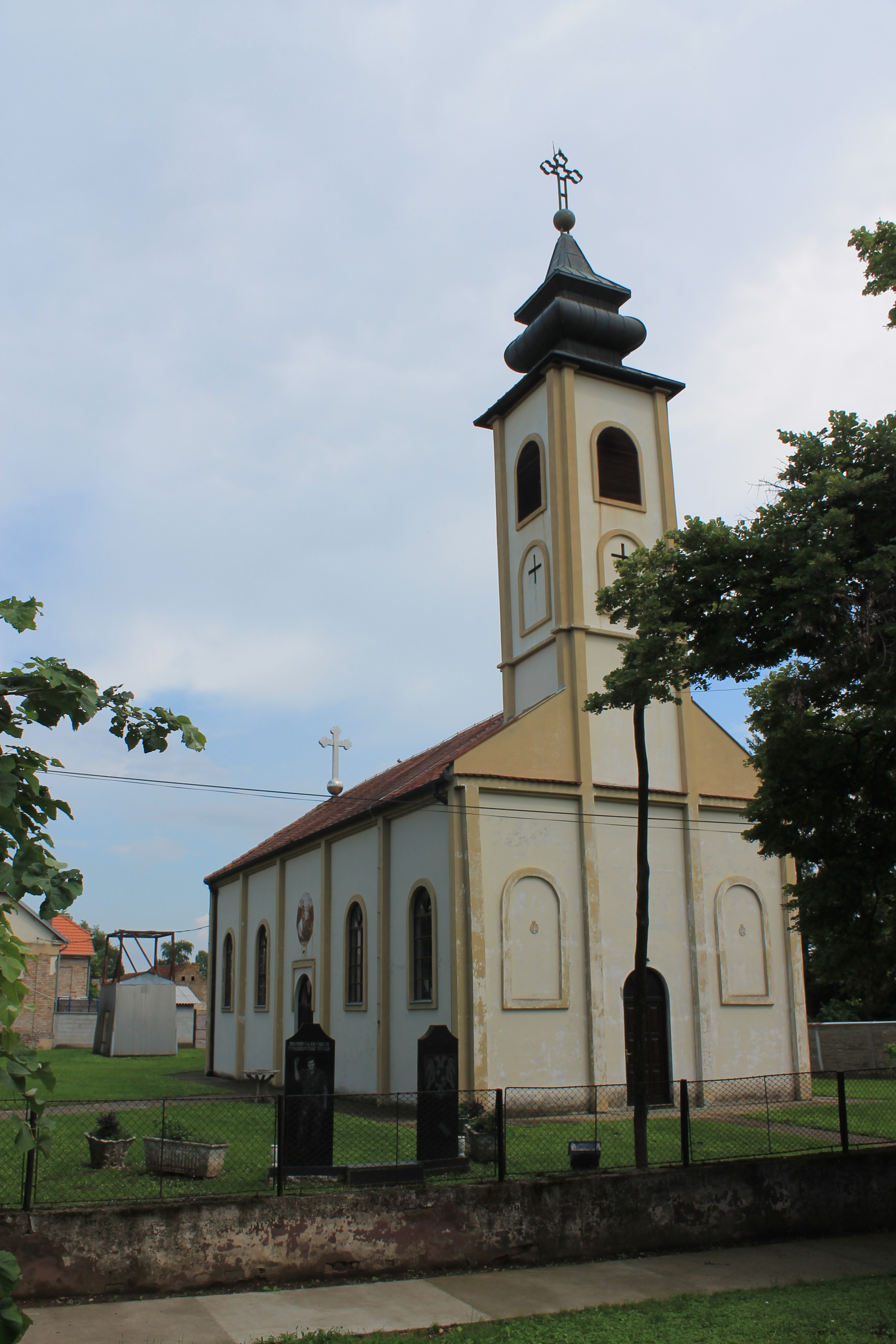
- Interactive map of Bingula
- Location within Vojvodina Location within Serbia Location within Europe
- Coordinates: 45°06′N 19°27′E
- Country: Serbia
- Province: Vojvodina
- Region: Syrmia
- District: Srem
- Municipality: Šid

Population (2002)
  - Total: 906
- Time zone: UTC+1 (CET)
  - Summer (DST): UTC+2 (CEST)

Bingula (Serbian Cyrillic: Бингула, Slovak: Binguľa) is a village in Serbia. It is situated in the Šid municipality, in the Srem District, Vojvodina province. The village has a Serb ethnic majority out of the entire population of 906 residents (2002 census) and with significant number of Slovaks in the entire population as well.

== History ==
Following Ottoman retreat from the region, the Lordship of Ilok and Upper Syrmia was established, and the village became part of its domain.

== Historical population ==
- 1931: 1,613
- 1961: 1,244
- 1971: 1,119
- 1981: 1,025
- 1991: 915
- 2002: 906

== See also ==
- List of places in Serbia
- List of cities, towns and villages in Vojvodina
