= Beočin =

Beočin Беочин (Serbian)
- Town and municipality
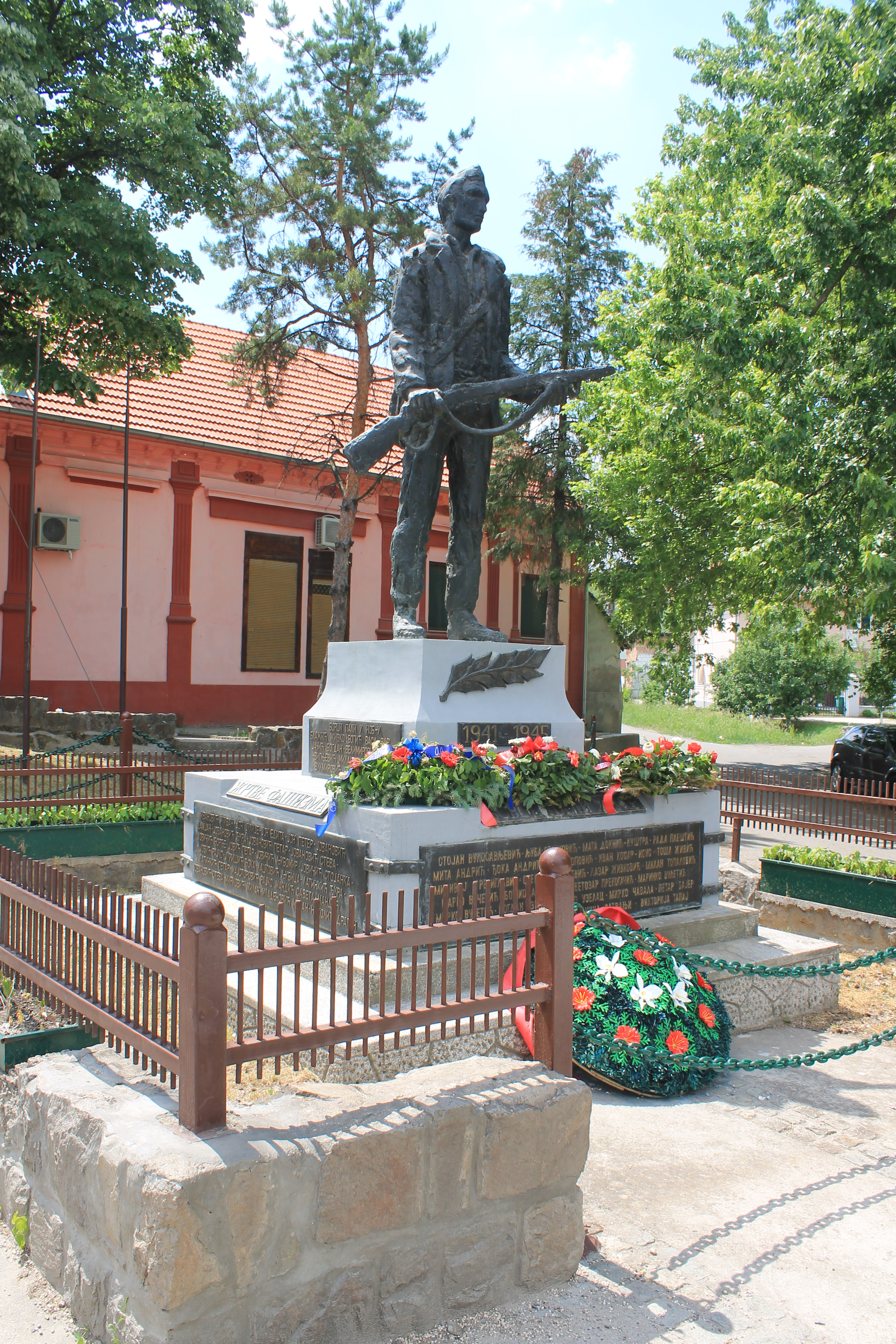
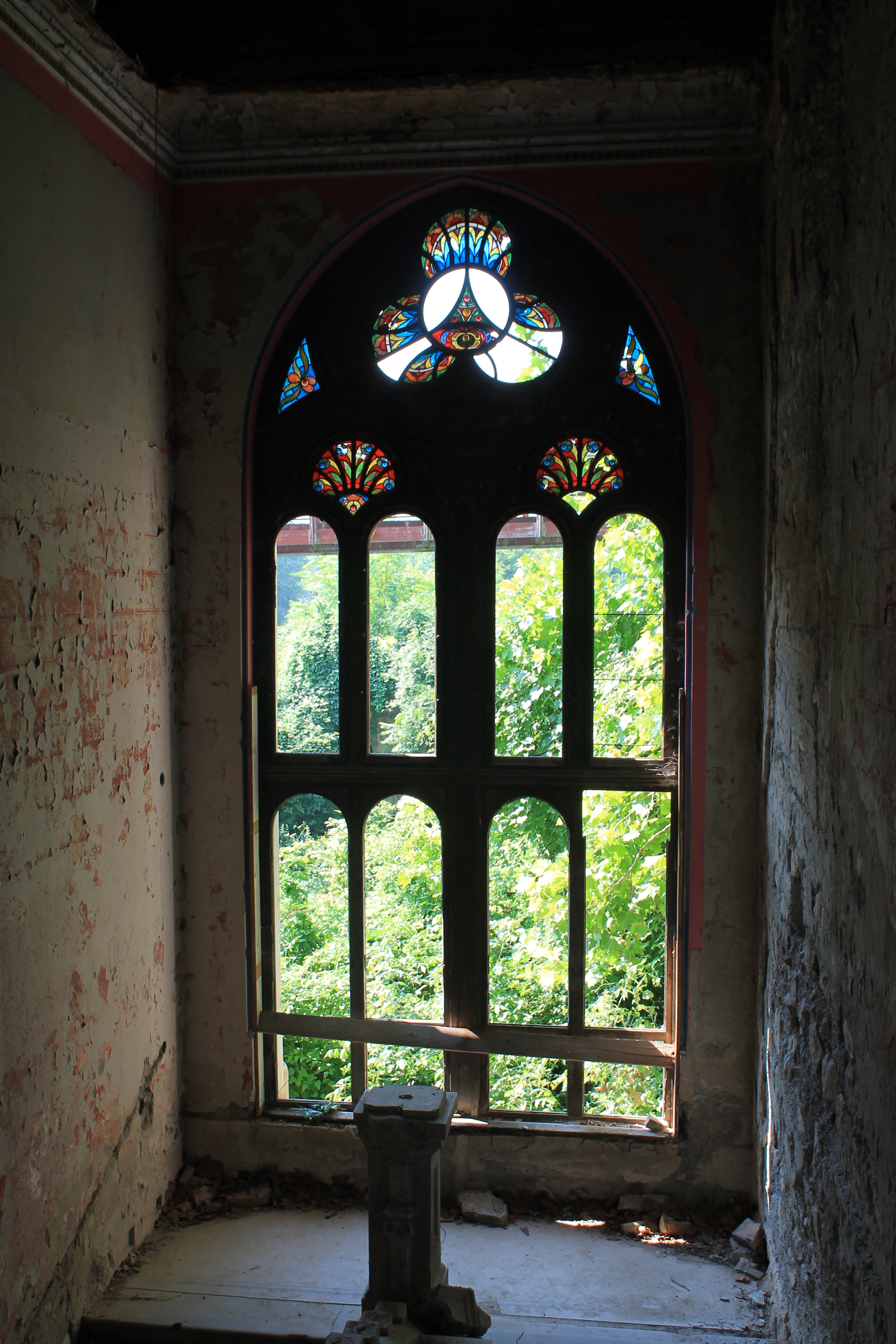
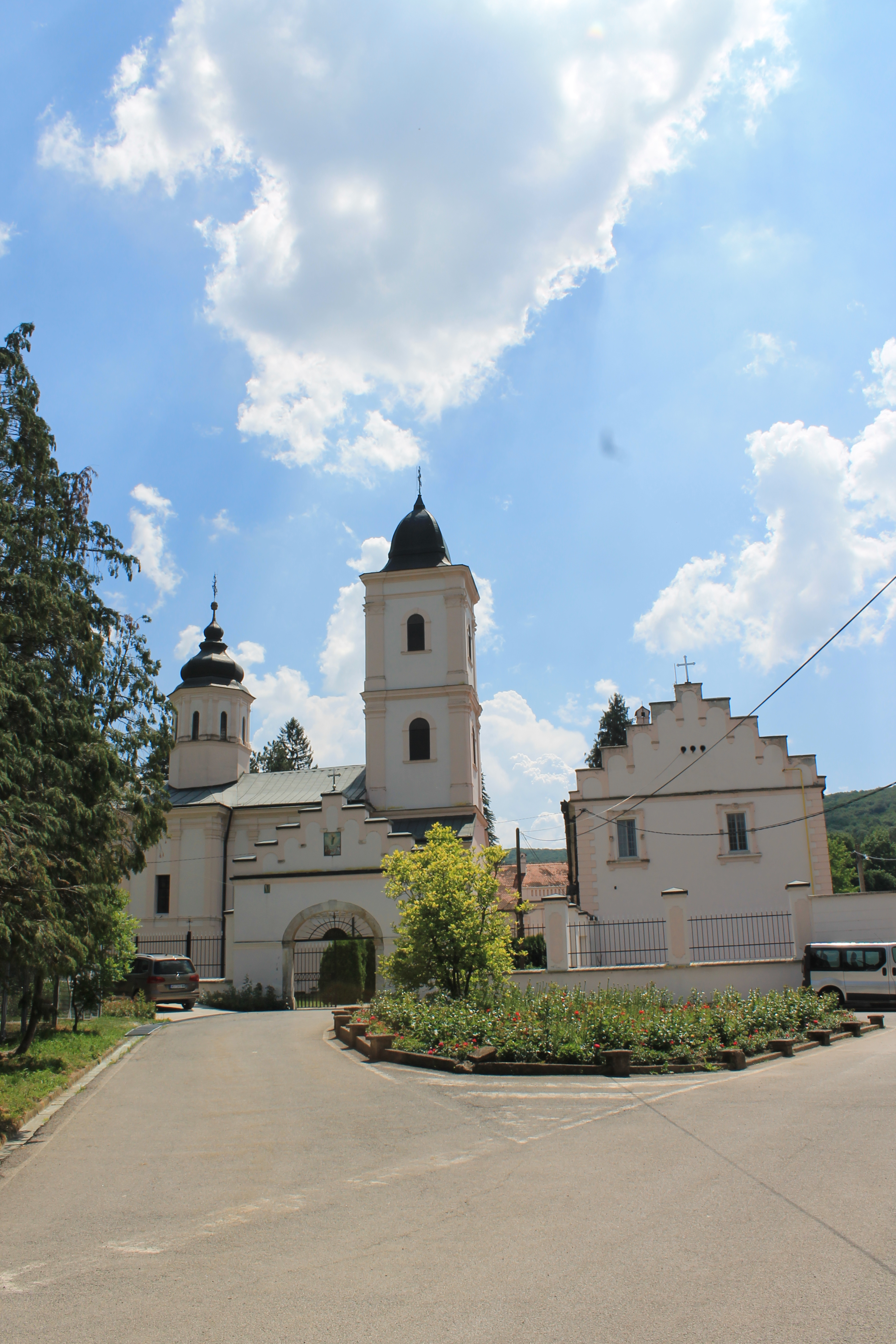
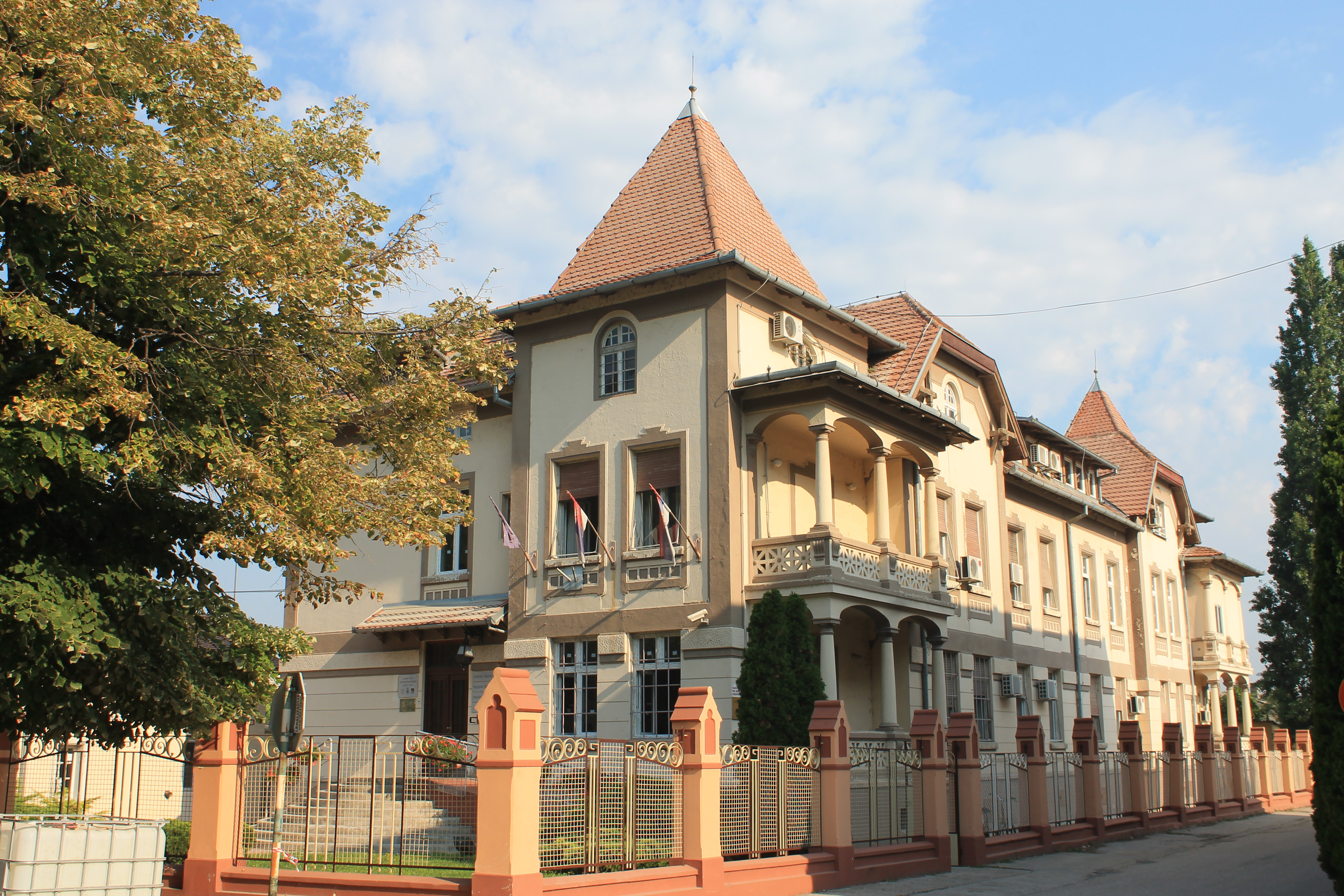
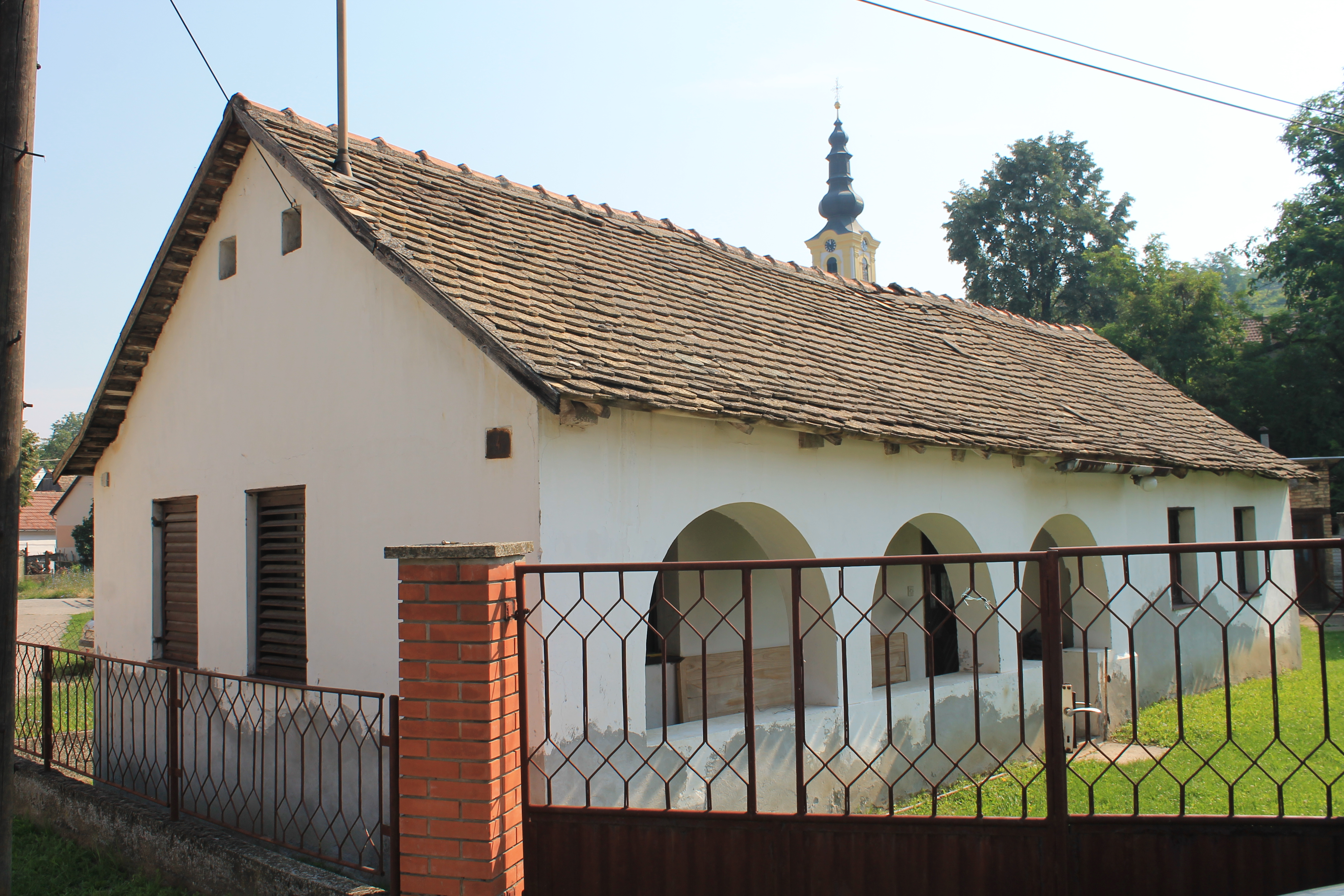
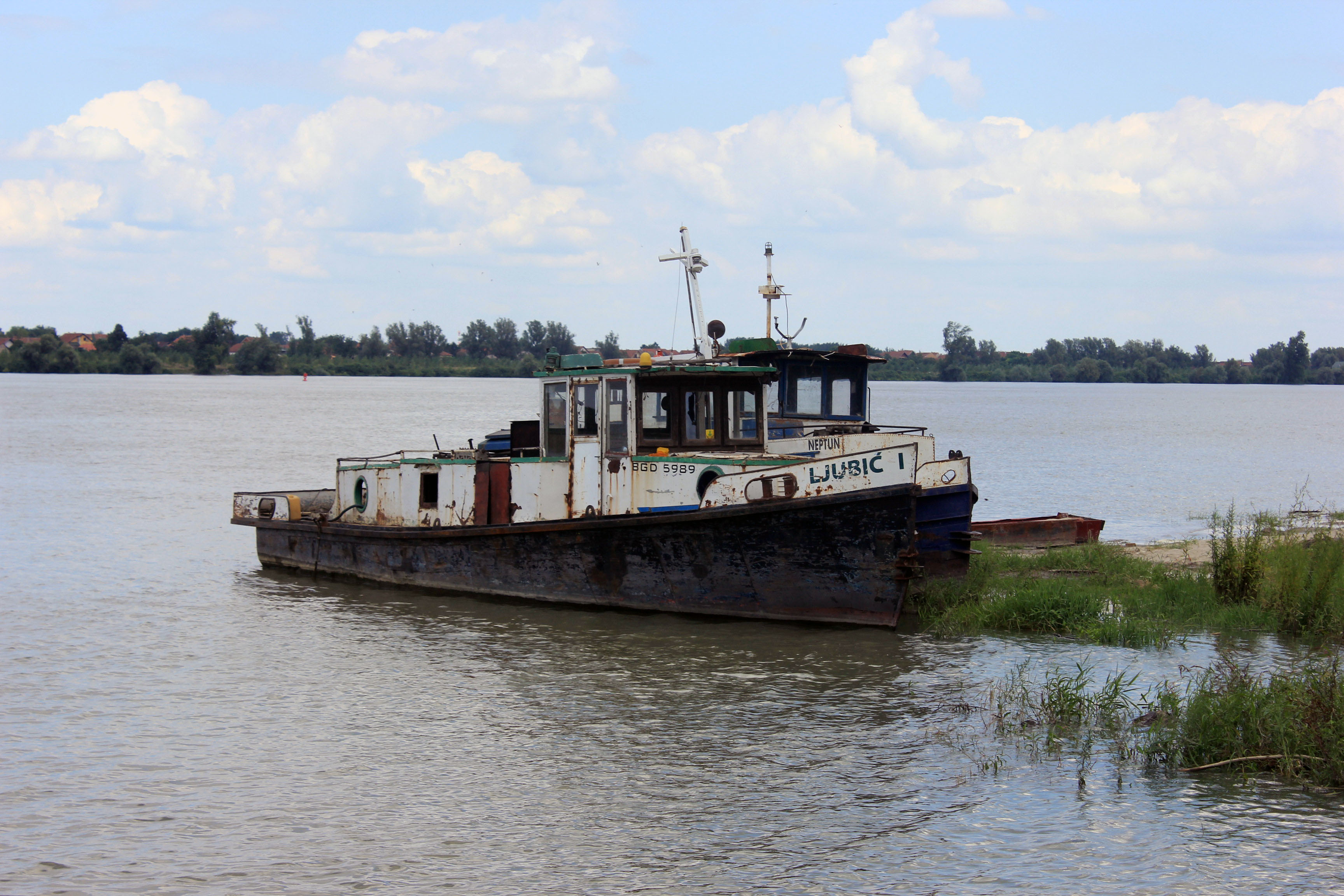
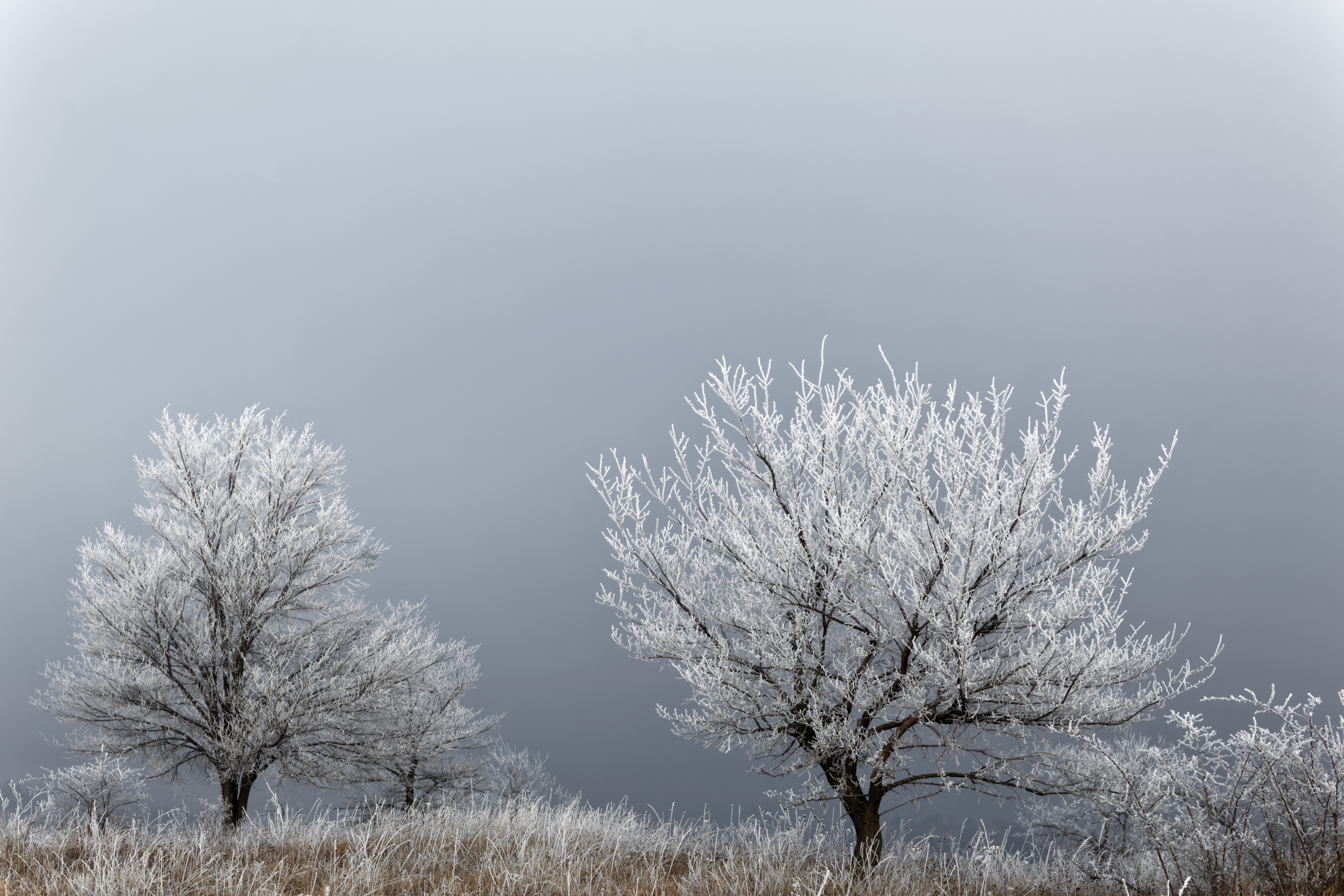
- Beočin

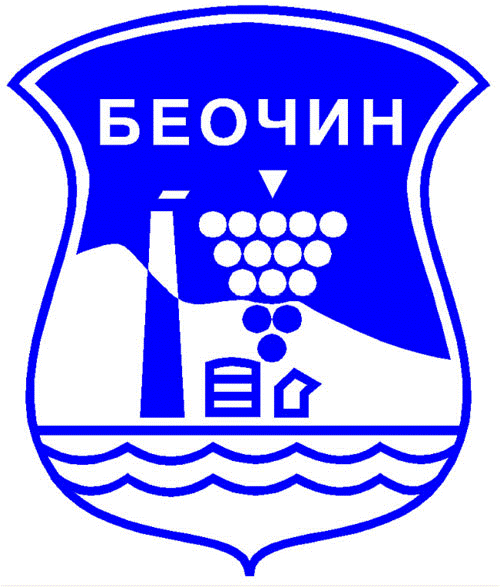
- Coat of arms

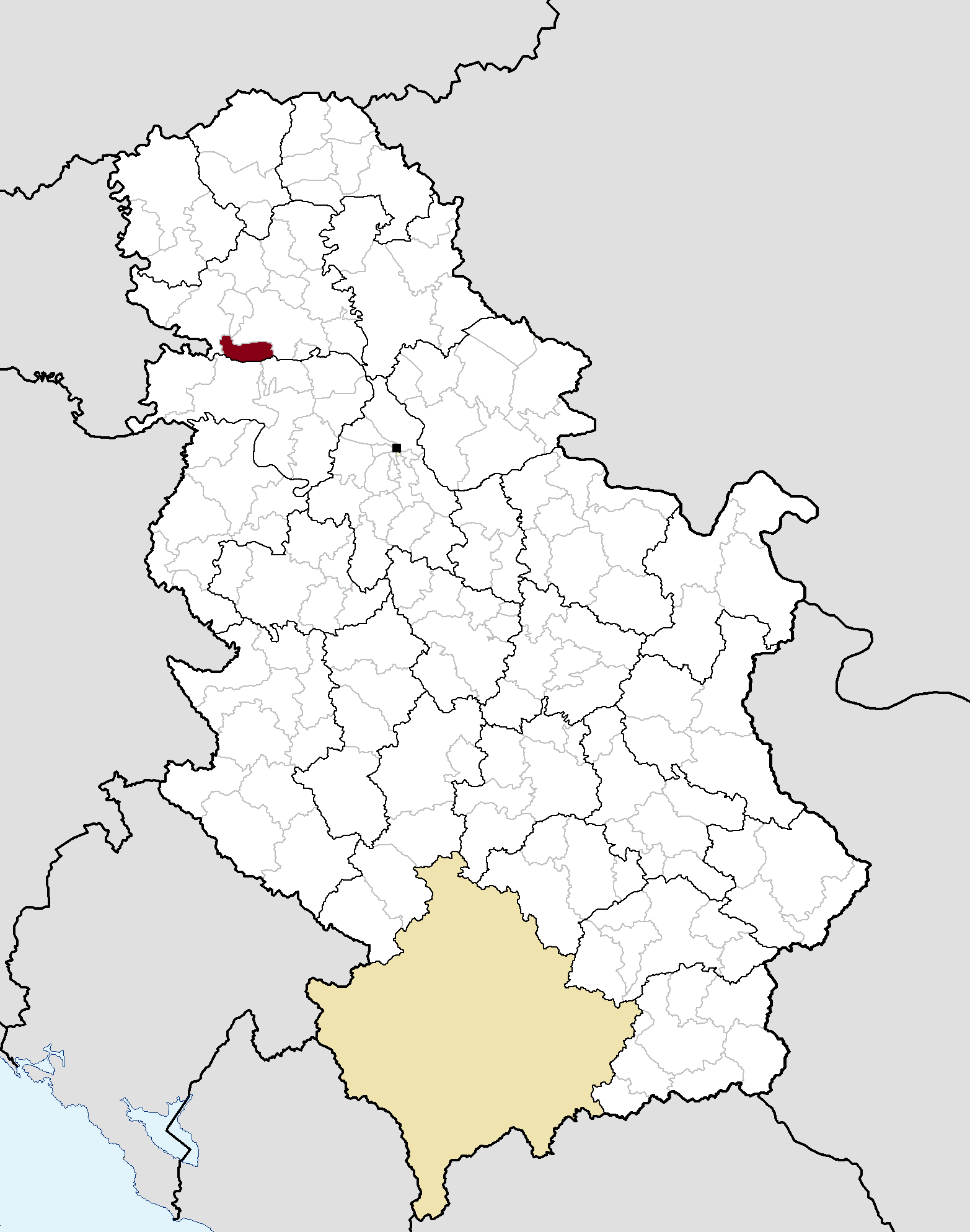
- Location of the municipality of Beočin within Serbia
- Interactive map of Beočin
- Coordinates: 45°12′N 19°44′E
- Country: Serbia
- Province: Vojvodina
- Region: Syrmia
- District: South Bačka
- Municipality: Beočin
- Settlements: 8

Government
  - Mayor: Biljana Janković (SNS)

Area
  - Town: 35.08 km^{2} (13.54 sq mi)
  - Municipality: 184.21 km^{2} (71.12 sq mi)
- Elevation: 88 m (289 ft)

Population (2022 census)
  - Town: 7,274
  - Town density: 207.4/km^{2} (537.0/sq mi)
  - Municipality: 13,875
  - Municipality density: 75.322/km^{2} (195.08/sq mi)
- Time zone: UTC+1 (CET)
  - Summer (DST): UTC+2 (CEST)
- Postal code: 21300
- Area code: +381 21
- Car plates: NS
- Official languages: Serbian together with Slovak in the village of Lug
- Website: www.beocin.rs

Beočin (Serbian Cyrillic: Беочин, pronounced [bɛɔ̌tʃiːn]; Hungarian: Belcsény) is a town and municipality located in the South Bačka District of the autonomous province of Vojvodina, Serbia. The population of the town is 7,274, whilst Beočin's municipality population is 13,875 (2022 census). There is also a Beočin Monastery from the 16th century in the municipality.

== Name ==
In Serbian, the town is known as Beočin (Беочин), in Croatian as Beočin, in Hungarian as Belcsény, in German (dated) as Beotschin, in Slovak as Beočín, and in Rusyn as Беочин.

The name of the town derives from the word that came from local Serbian dialect, which in modern standard Serbian would be written as "beli otac" or in English as "white father" (the full meaning of the name is "the place that belong to white father"). The name referred to the prior of the nearby Beočin monastery.

== Geography ==
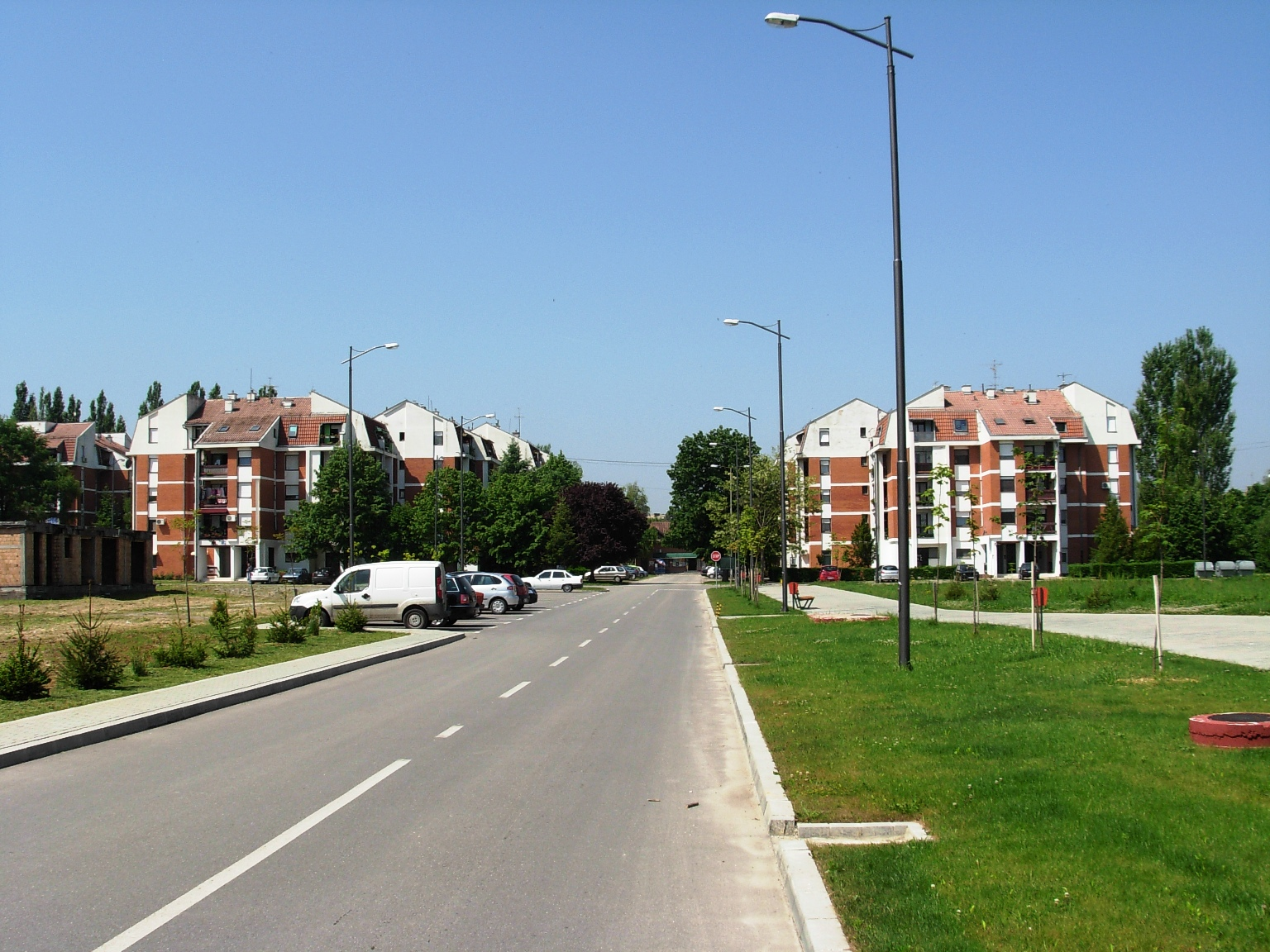
Residential buildings in Beočin

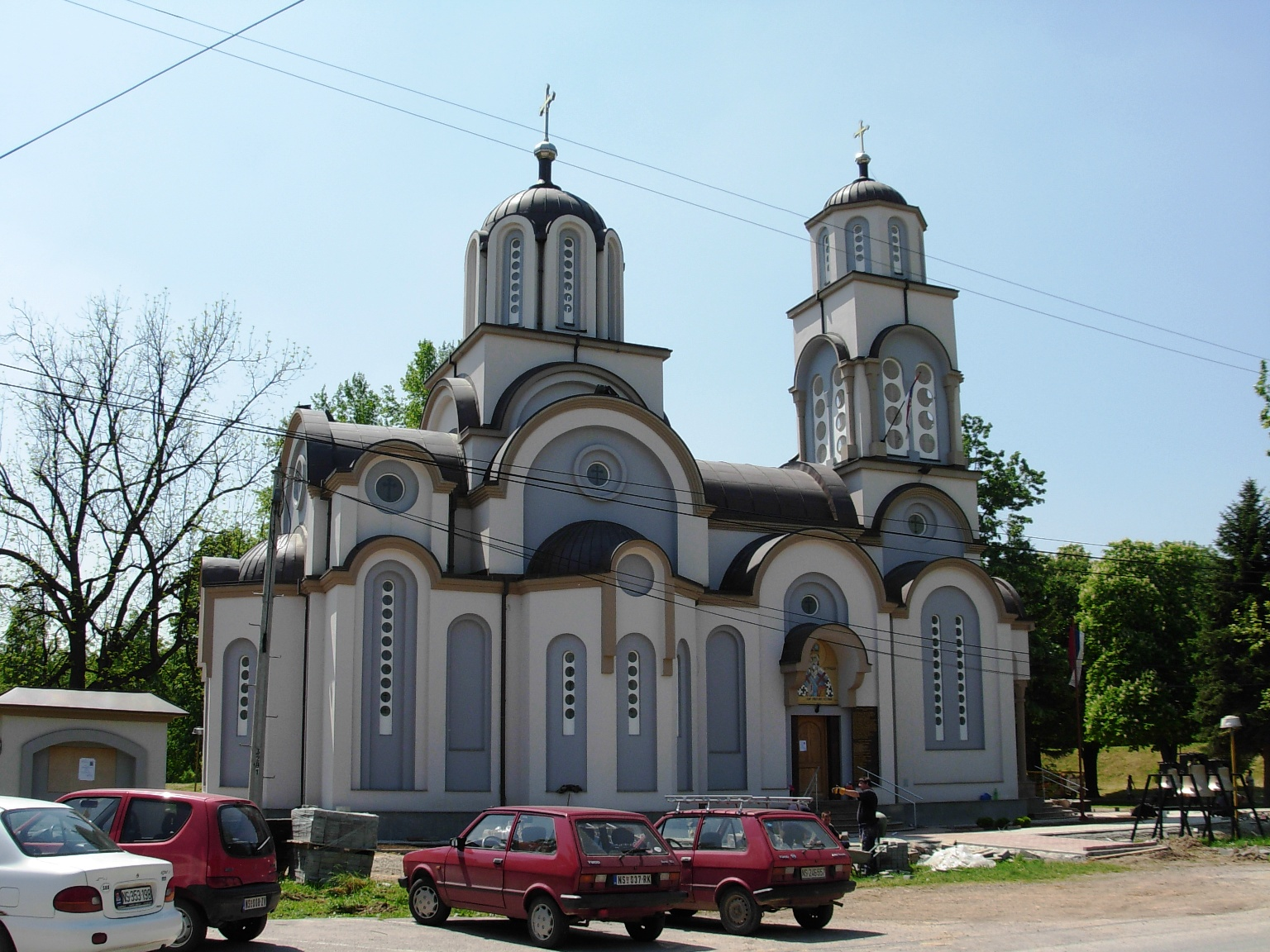
Orthodox church of Saint Vasilije Ostroški

Although it is geographically located in Syrmia, Beočin administratively belong to South Bačka District. The town of Beočin is divided into two parts: Beočin Grad ("Beočin town") and Beočin Selo ("Beočin village"). However, no matter that Beočin Selo is called a village, it is not a village but simply part of the town.

== History ==
The existence of the Serbian Orthodox monastery of Beočin (which is located 2 km in the south from modern town) was first recorded by the sources in 1566-67. Until the end of the 18th century, a small settlement (hamlet) existed near this monastery. During Ottoman administration, this settlement was populated by ethnic Serbs.

The settlement that developed into modern Beočin was mentioned in 1702. By then the hamlet had grown into 49 households. In the beginning, it was only a village, and its basic economic activity was wine production (even today, the oldest part of Beočin is known as Beočin Selo, i.e. "Beočin village" in English). After the cement factory was opened in 1839, Beočin developed into a modern town, which over time became the centre of northern Syrmia. The cement factory in Beočin is one of the largest cement factories in Europe. The new, urban part of town developed as a worker's colony and was known as Fabrika ("factory"), Beočin Fabrika ("Beočin factory") and Beočin Grad ("Beočin town").

Until the middle of the 18th century, the village of Beočin was under Habsburg military administration. After 1745, it was part of t Syrmia County, which was one of three counties of the Habsburg Kingdom of Slavonia. In 1828, majority of inhabitants of Beočin village were Orthodox Christians.

In 1848–49, Beočin was part of Serbian Vojvodina, while from 1849 to 1860 it was part of the Voivodeship of Serbia and Banat of Temeschwar. After the abolishment of the voivodeship in 1860, Beočin was again incorporated into Syrmia County of the Kingdom of Slavonia. In 1868, Kingdom of Slavonia was joined with the Kingdom of Croatia into the Kingdom of Croatia-Slavonia, which was part of the Kingdom of Hungary and Austria-Hungary. In 1910, population of Beočin Selo numbered 3,342 inhabitants, while population of Beočin Fabrika numbered 262 inhabitants. According to 1910 census, largest ethnic group in Beočin were Serbs, while other ethnic groups that lived in the settlement included Hungarians, Germans, Croats, and others.

In 1918, Beočin first became part of the State of Slovenes, Croats and Serbs, then part of the Kingdom of Serbia and finally part of the Kingdom of Serbs, Croats and Slovenes (later renamed to Yugoslavia). From 1918 to 1922, Beočin was part of Syrmia county, from 1922 to 1929 part of Syrmia oblast, and from 1929 to 1939 part of the Danube Banovina, and from 1939 to 1941 part of the Banovina of Croatia. During World War II, from 1941 to 1944, Beočin was occupied by Axis troops and was included in Pavelić's Independent State of Croatia. During the Axis occupation, 66 civilians were killed in Beočin by fascists. In 1944, Beočin was liberated by Yugoslav partisans. Since 1944, the town is part of Vojvodina, which (from 1945) was an autonomous province of Serbia and Yugoslavia.

Until the end of World War II, Beočin was part of the Ilok municipality. Since the newly established post-WW2 border between Vojvodina (Serbia) and Croatia divided the former Ilok municipality, Beočin was included into Novi Sad municipality. Later, a separate municipality of Beočin was established. In 1948, the population of Beočin Fabrika numbered 2,144 and the population of Beočin Selo numbered 1,495.

== Demographics ==
Historical population
Year	Pop.	±% p.a.
1931	3,857	—
1948	9,401	+5.38%
1953	10,243	+1.73%
1961	11,881	+1.87%
1971	13,216	+1.07%
1981	14,126	+0.67%
1991	14,848	+0.50%
2002	16,086	+0.73%
2011	15,726	−0.25%
2022	13,875	−1.13%

According to the 2022 census results, the municipality of Beočin had 13,875 inhabitants.

=== Inhabited places ===
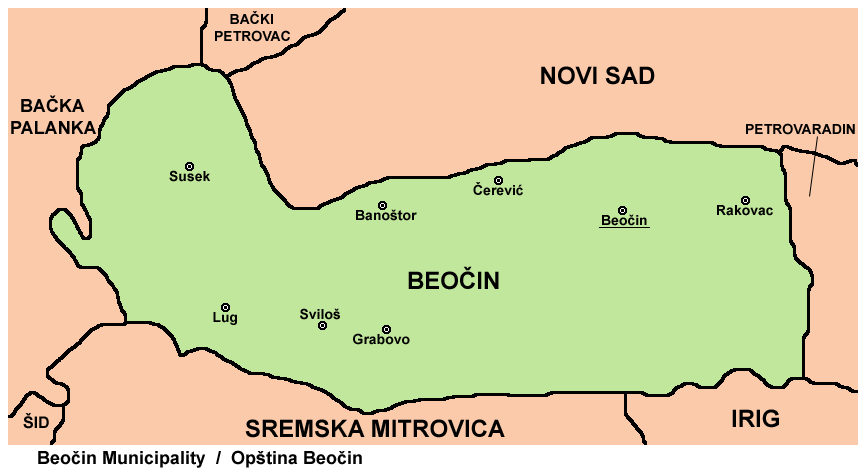
Map of Beočin municipality

Beočin municipality encompasses the town of Beočin, and the following villages:

No.	Name	Population (2022 data)
1	Banoštor	643
2	Grabovo	65
3	Lug	529
4	Rakovac	2,137
5	Sviloš	239
6	Susek	847
7	Čerević	2,141

=== Ethnic groups ===
Most of the settlements in the municipality have an ethnic Serb majority, while the village of Lug have an ethnic Slovak majority. Ethnic composition of the city:

Ethnic group	Population	%
Serbs	10,956	69.67%
Roma	1,422	9.04%
Slovaks	830	5.28%
Croats	557	3.54%
Hungarians	295	1.88%
Yugoslavs	161	1.02%
Slovenians	70	0.45%
Montenegrins	61	0.39%
Germans	45	0.29%
Muslims	37	0.24%
Macedonians	33	0.21%
Others	1,259	8.01%
Total	15,726	

Beočin is one of the centers of the Islamic Community of Vojvodina. As of 2006, it was one of the three settlements in Vojvodina where Islamic religious buildings could be found (The other two settlements are Novi Sad and Subotica).

== Culture ==
The oldest Serb rural schools in Vojvodina were established in present-day Beočin municipality: in Grabovo (1625) and Sviloš (1695). There are also two important Serbian Orthodox monasteries: Beočin monastery, whose existence was first recorded in 1566-67 and Rakovac monastery, whose existence was first recorded in 1545-48.

== Economy ==
The following table gives a preview of total number of employed people per their core activity (as of 2017):

Activity	Total
Agriculture, forestry and fishing	34
Mining	13
Processing industry	996
Distribution of power, gas and water	17
Distribution of water and water waste management	76
Construction	166
Wholesale and retail, repair	423
Traffic, storage and communication	210
Hotels and restaurants	54
Media and telecommunications	7
Finance and insurance	17
Property stock and charter	-
Professional, scientific, innovative and technical activities	70
Administrative and other services	128
Administration and social assurance	176
Education	183
Healthcare and social work	145
Art, leisure and recreation	29
Other services	53
Total	2,797

== Gallery ==
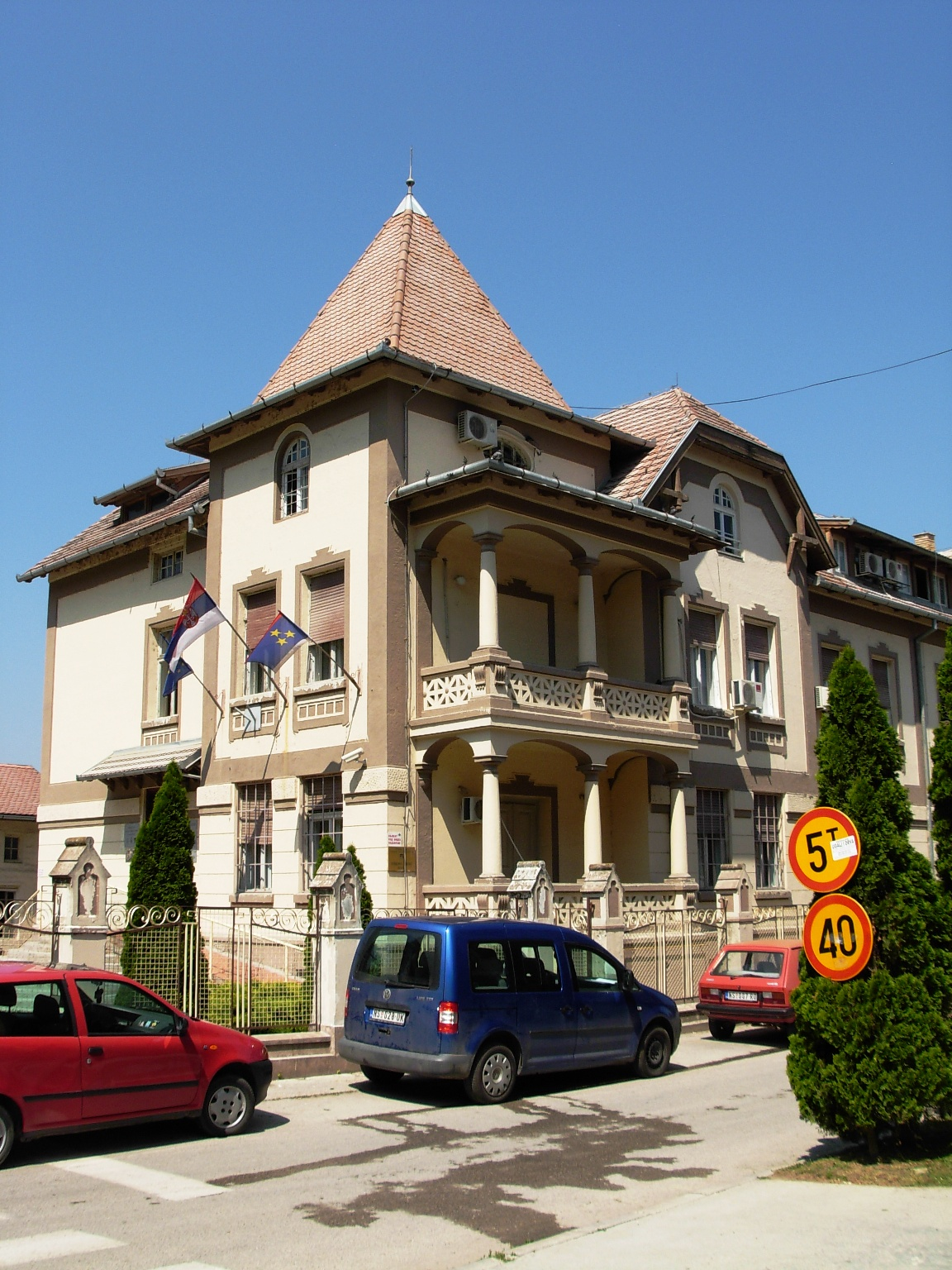
Building of municipal parliament

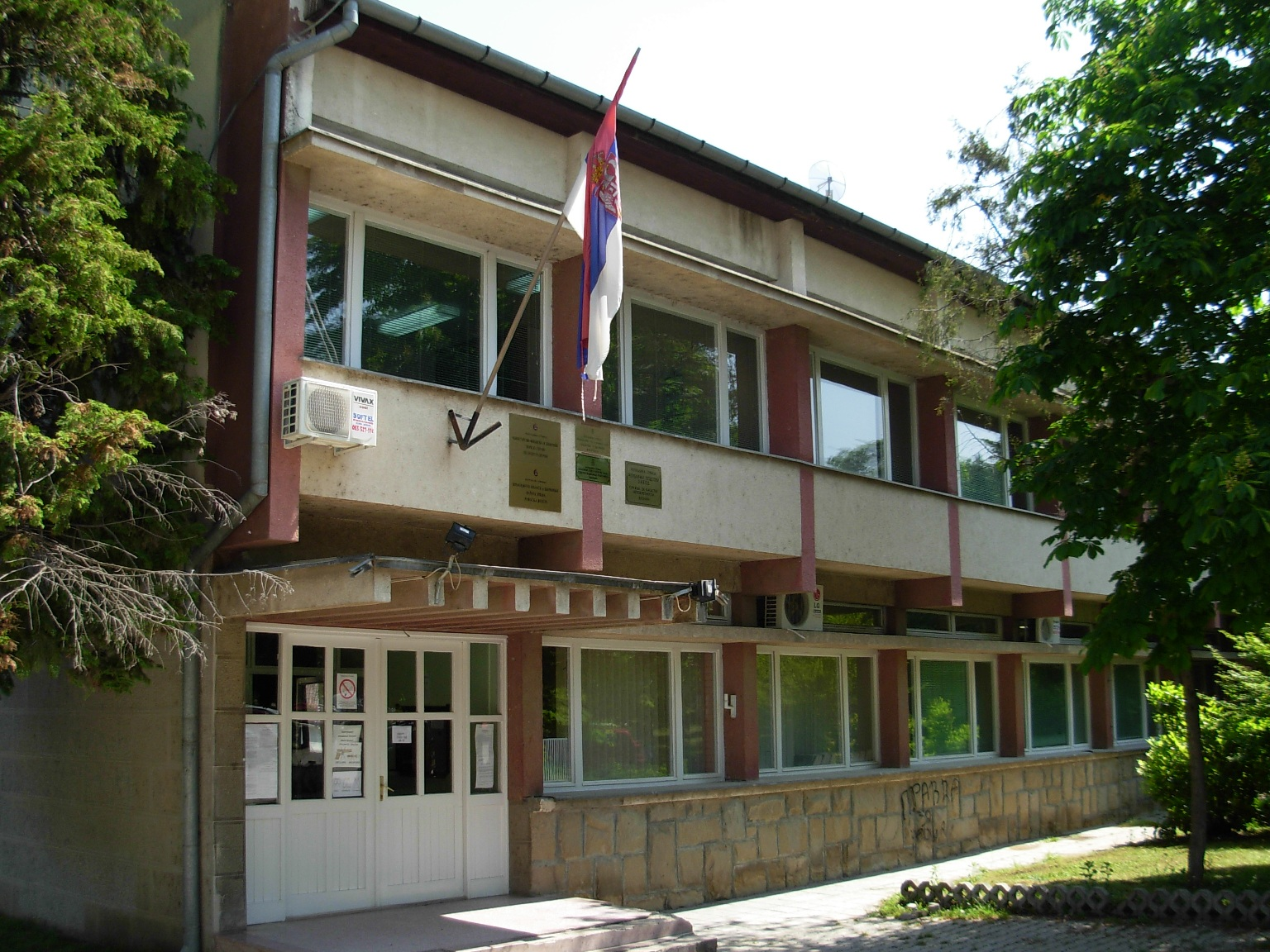
Building of municipal court

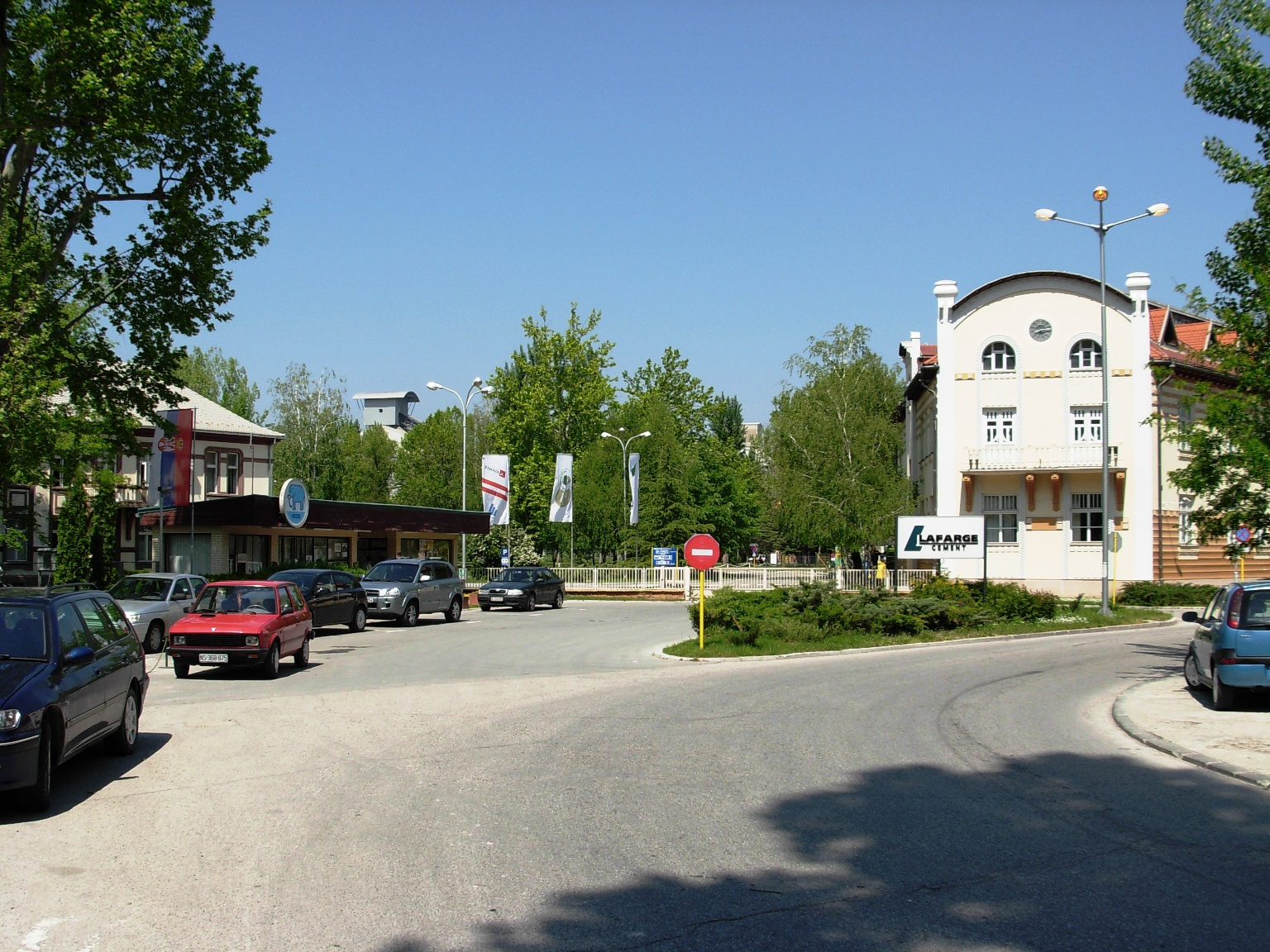
Beočin cement factory

== Twin Cities ==
- Ugljevik, Bosnia and Herzegovina since 1982.
- Nováky, Slovakia
- Battonya, Hungary

== See also ==
- Syrmia
- List of places in Serbia
- List of cities, towns and villages in Vojvodina
