= Church of the Presentation of the Theotokos, Sviloš =

Church in Vojvodina, Serbia

Church of the Presentation of the Theotokos
- Црква ваведења пресвете Богородице
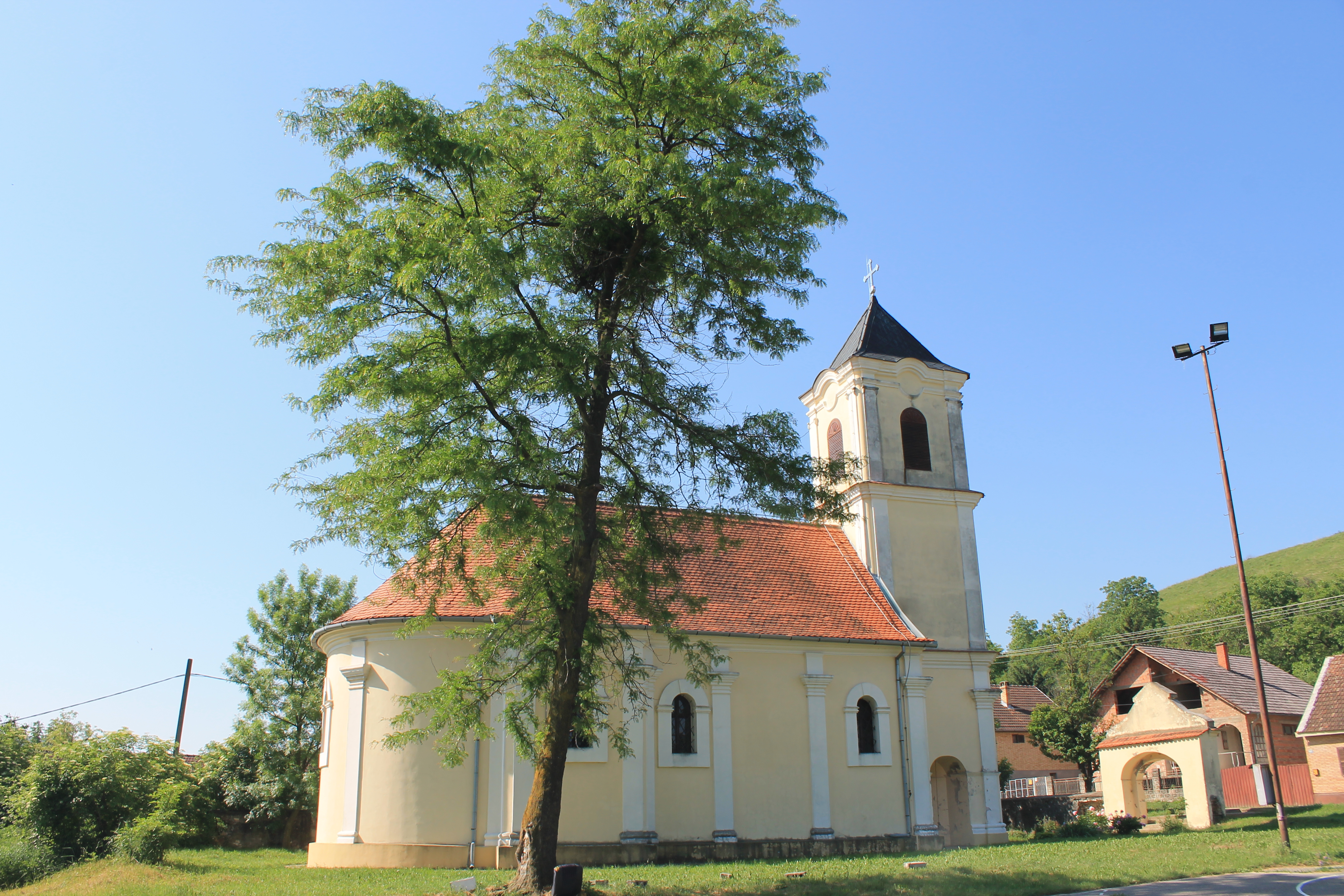
- Church of the Dormition of the Theotokos
- Church of the Presentation of the Theotokos
- 45°10′27″N 19°35′09″E
- Location: Sviloš, Vojvodina

Cultural Heritage of Serbia
- Type: Cultural Monument of Great Importance
- Designated: 2011
- Reference no.: СК 2075
- Country: Serbia
- Denomination: Serbian Orthodox

History
- Status: Church
- Dedication: Presentation of the Theotokos

Architecture
- Functional status: Active
- Years built: beginning of 17th century

Administration
- Archdiocese: Eparchy of Srem

The Church of the Presentation of the Theotokos (Serbian: Црква ваведења пресвете Богородице) in Sviloš is Serbian Orthodox church in Vojvodina, Serbia. It is a single-nave building with a semicircular altar apse and a bell tower with a square base. The iconostasis, crafted in the classical style, was carved by an anonymous yet skilled master from the first half of the 19th century while icons were painted by the Novi Sad artist Matej Petrović in 1855. According to historical records, the church was built in the late 1780s while parish registers were introduced between 1809 and 1812. The building is listed as a Cultural Monuments of Great Importance.

== See also ==
- Eparchy of Srem
