= Muftiate of Novi Sad =

Muftiship of Novi Sad (Serbian: Новосадско муфтијство, Novosadsko muftijstvo) is one of the four muftiships of the Islamic Community in Serbia, with jurisdiction over territory of Vojvodina.

== Organization ==
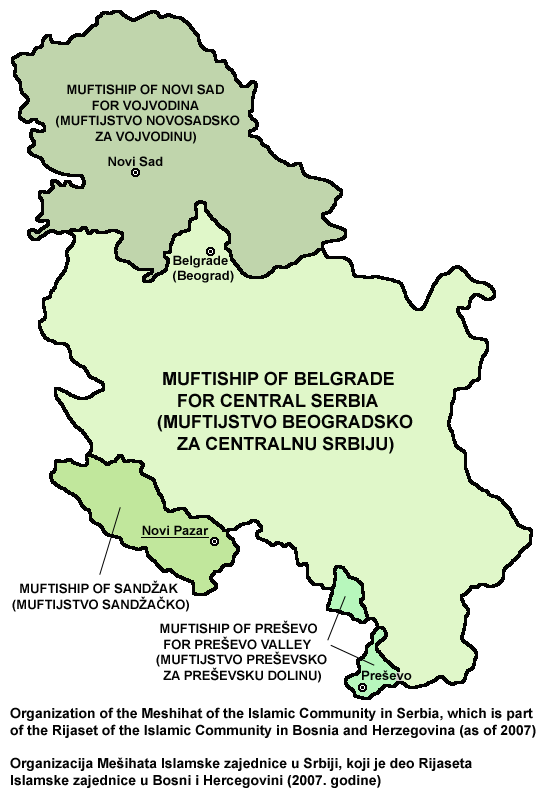
Map of the organization of the Islamic Community in Serbia

Muftiship is divided into four organizational divisions:

- Novi Sad
- Beočin
- Subotica
- Zrenjanin

Administrator of the muftiship is mufti Fadil Murati.

== Demographics ==
Muslims of Vojvodina are members of various ethnic groups, including Roma, ethnic Muslims, Albanians, Gorani, Bosniaks, Ashkali and Egyptians.

== History ==
Islam appeared in the territory of present-day Vojvodina in the 16th century, when this area became part of the Ottoman Empire. Syrmia was part of the Ottoman Empire since 1526 (including the period of vassal Syrmian duchy of Radoslav Čelnik that existed from 1527 to 1530), while Bačka and Banat were included into Ottoman Empire later, in 1541-1545 (Bačka) and in 1552-1556 (Banat). Ottoman leader who conquered Banat was Muslim Serb Mehmed paša Sokolović, whose army included 8,000 janissaries and 100,000 akindjias, of whom 20,000 were Serbs.

During the Ottoman administration in the Balkans and in the Pannonian Plain, many Serbs converted to Islam, which was a condition for advancement in the state service. Some Muslim Serbs were in high administrative positions, like bej Malković, who was the first Ottoman administrator of Bečkerek or Hasan paša Predojević, who was administrator of the Sanjak of Segedin in 1592.

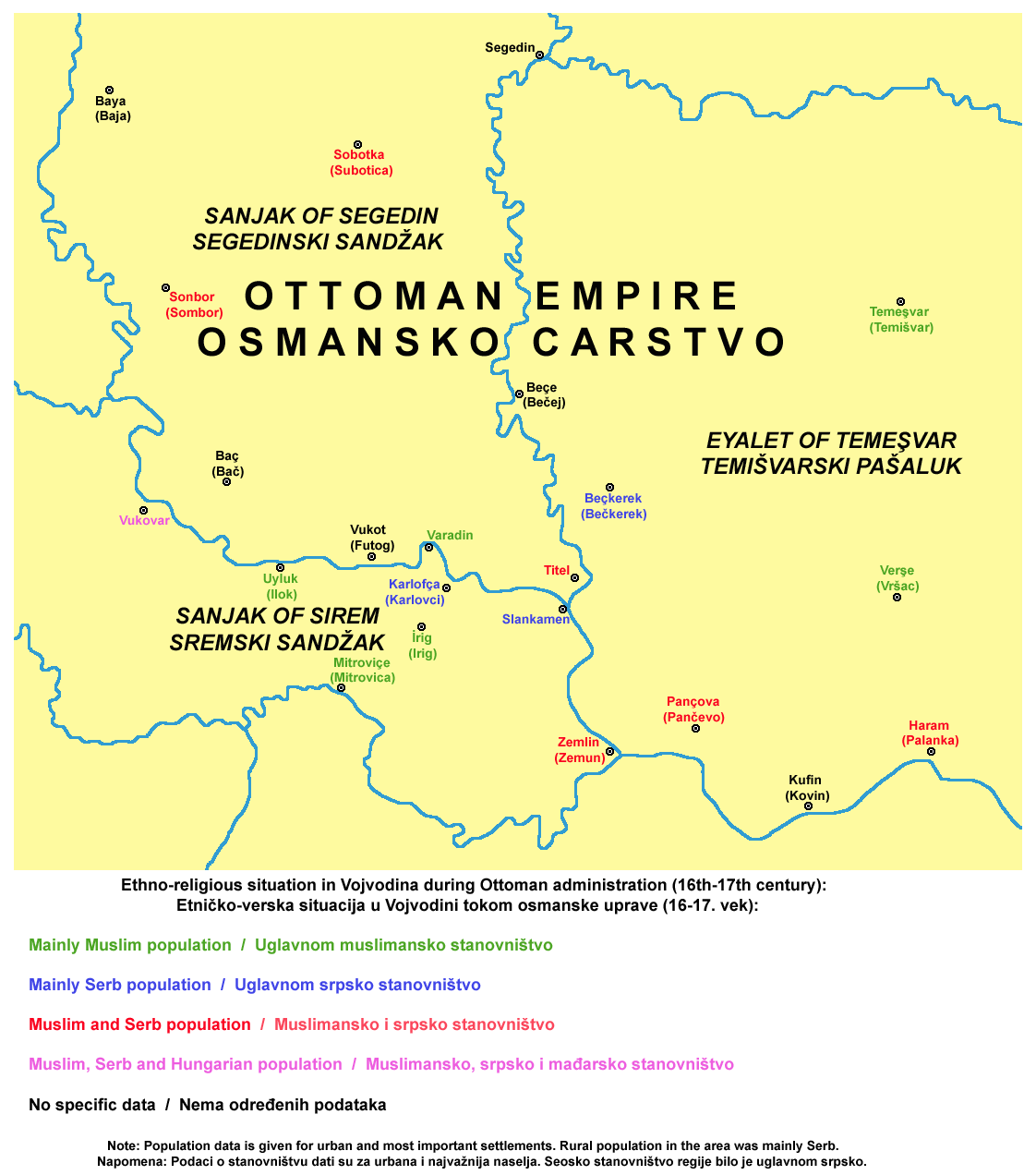
Muslims in some cities in Vojvodina during Ottoman administration (16th-17th century)

During the Ottoman administration, villages in Vojvodina were populated by Serbs, while cities were populated by ethnically and religiously diverse population which included Muslims (Turks, Muslim Serbs, Arabs), Serbs, Roma, Greeks, Aromanians, Jews, etc.

Some cities of Vojvodina were majority Serb, some majority Muslim, while some had mixed populations. All settlements had mosques, while important cities also had administrative buildings, baths, Muslim schools and other public buildings. Main street (čaršija) usually had main trading and manufacturing shops.

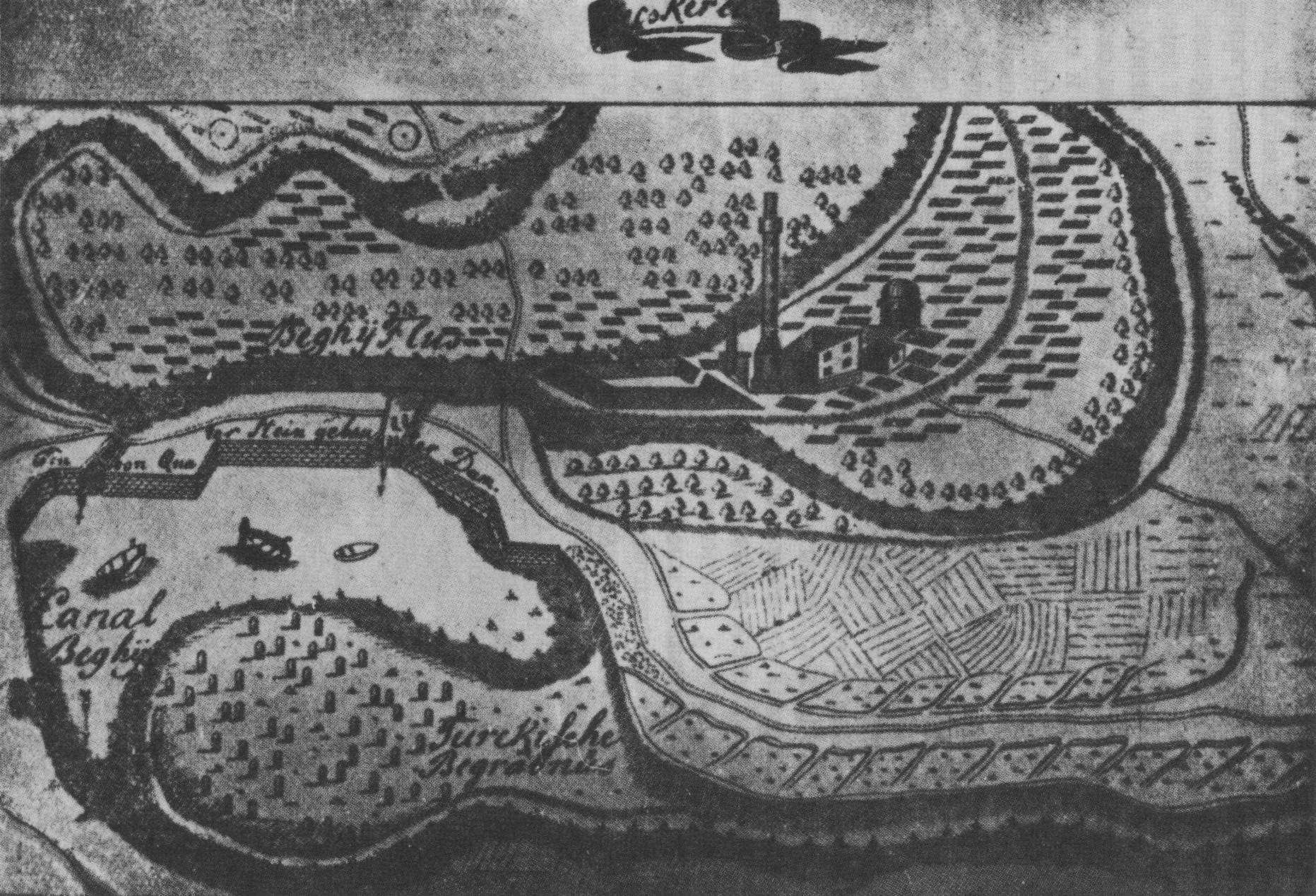
City of Bečkerek in 1697-98, including mosque with minaret

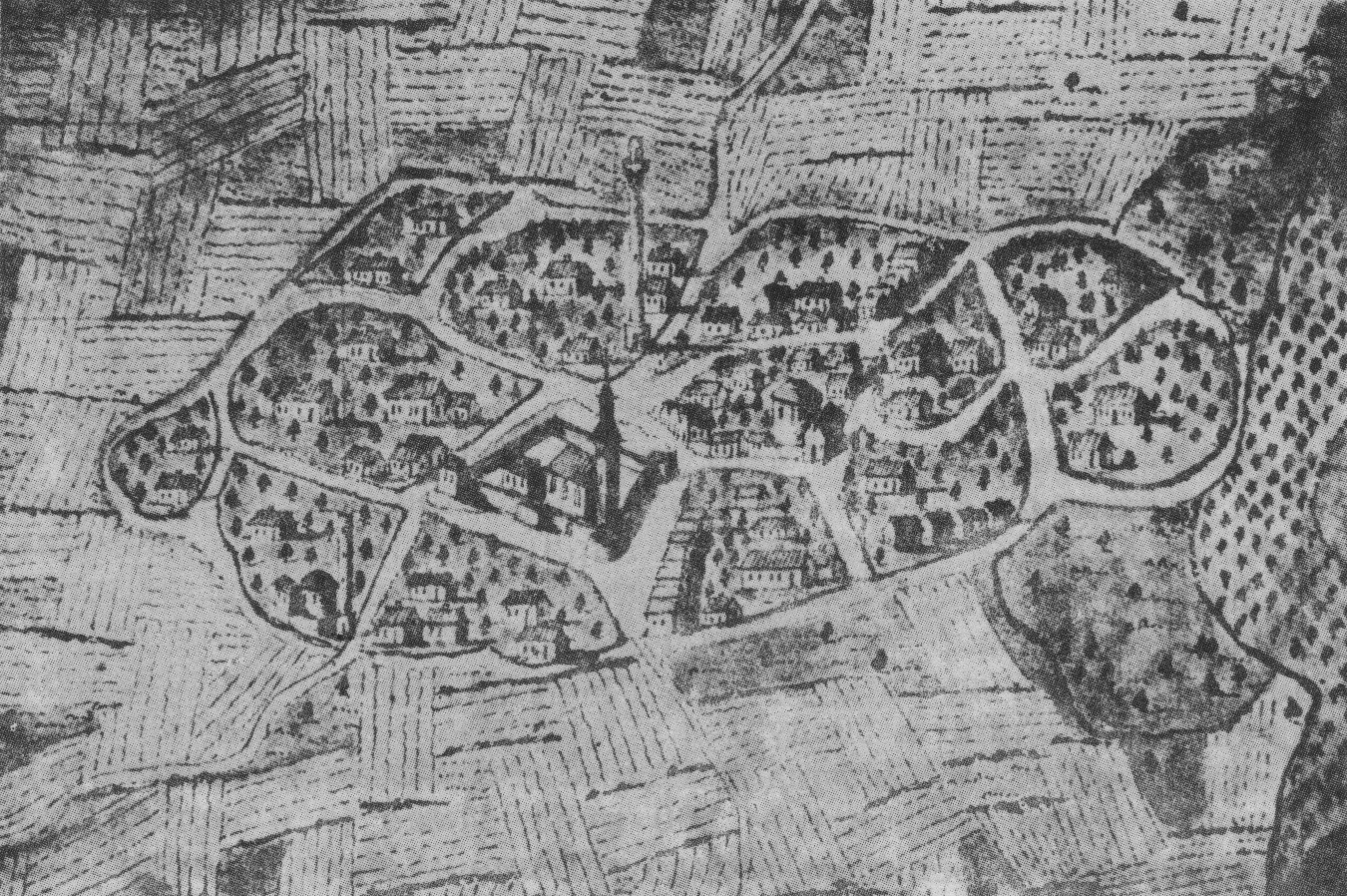
City of Sombor in 1698, including mosques with minarets and Christian church with tower

According to the records, following important cities of Vojvodina had sizable Muslim populations in Ottoman times:

- Mitrovica (modern Sremska Mitrovica) was an important Muslim city. According to 1572 data, its population included 598 Muslim and 18 Christian houses. City also had 17 mosques and did not have a Christian church.
- Bečkerek (modern Zrenjanin) was one of the most important cities in Banat. Because local Serbs from Bečkerek helped Ottoman conquest of Banat, Mehmed paša Sokolović turned this city into his endowment (vakuf) and its citizens were liberated from all military taxes. City was divided into two parts (mahalas) - one Muslim and another Serb.
- Sombor had 14 Muslim religious objects, of which 5 mosques and 9 mahala masjids.
- Varadin (modern Petrovaradin) had Muslim majority in Ottoman times. In Podgrađe (oldest part of modern town), there was about 200 houses and mosque of Sulejman-han, while two smaller mosques also existed: mosque of Hadži-Ibrahim and mosque of Husein. Besides two Muslim quarters (mahalas), there was also a Christian quarter with 35 Serb houses.
- Vršac was mainly populated by Muslims in Ottoman times.
- Titel was populated by Muslim and Serb population.

Ottoman Empire was divided into provinces (pashaluks or eyalets), which were divided into smaller units - sanjaks. In the territory of Banat there was a first-level Ottoman administrative unit, the Eyalet of Temeşvar, while Sanjak of Syrmia and Sanjak of Segedin existed in Syrmia and Bačka. Both sanjaks initially were part of the Eyalet of Budin, but Sanjak of Segedin was later included into the Eyalet of Egir.

After Habsburg conquest of Vojvodina (late 17th and early 18th century), almost entire Muslim population left from this area. Some of the Muslim refugees were later resettled in Bosnia and Herzegovina, mainly in its northern part and in the vicinity of river Bosnia, where they were known as "Unđurovci" ("refugees from Hungary"). Their larger settlements had "urijas" (rough municipal terrains), like in Vojvodina. Habsburgs also destroyed almost all traces of Islamic culture in Vojvodina and first mosque in Vojvodina after Habsburg conquest was built only in 2008 in Subotica, after almost three centuries.

Modern Muslim population of Vojvodina mostly descending from migrants who came to Vojvodina after World War II from Muslim-majority areas of former Yugoslavia - North Macedonia, Kosovo, Sandžak, and Bosnia and Herzegovina. In 1991, Islamic Community of Vojvodina with seat in Novi Sad was established. With the formation of the Islamic Community in Serbia in 2007, Islamic Community of Vojvodina became its part and was officially named the Muftiship of Novi Sad.

In 2009, there was a clash of two groups of Muslim believers in front of the masjid of Islamic community in Adamovićevo Naselje in Novi Sad, when members of the rival Islamic Community of Serbia attempted to take over administrative offices of the Muftiship of Novi Sad and to replace imam Fadil Murati. Another clash between the two communities occurred in Beočin in 2011.

== Religious objects ==
Muftiship of Novi Sad possesses the following religious objects:

- Masjid in Adamovićevo Naselje in Novi Sad, exists from 1979
- Masjid in Subotica, exists from 2001
- Masjid in Veliki Rit in Novi Sad, exists from 2005
- Masjid in Beočin, exists from 2006
- Muhadžir Mosque in Subotica, built in 2008

== See also ==
- Islam in Serbia
- Religion in Vojvodina

== Sources ==
- Dr Dušan J. Popović, Srbi u Vojvodini, knjiga 1, Novi Sad, 1990.
- Milan Tutorov, Banatska rapsodija - istorika Zrenjanina i Banata, Novi Sad, 2001.
- Dr Dušan Popov, Petrovaradinska tvrđava, Enciklopedija Novog Sada, knjiga 20, Novi Sad, 2002.
- Dušan Belča, Mala istorija Vršca, Vršac, 1997.
- Marko Jovanov, Devet vekova od pomena imena Titela, Titelski letopis, Titel, 2001.
- Petar N. Gaković, Bosna vilajet, Beograd, 2005.
