= Joseph I =

Joseph I or Josef I may refer to:

- Joseph I of Constantinople, Ecumenical Patriarch in 1266–1275 and 1282–1283
- Joseph I, Holy Roman Emperor (1678–1711)
- Joseph I (Chaldean Patriarch) (reigned 1681–1696)
- Joseph I of Portugal (1750–1777)
- Joseph Bonaparte, brother of Napoleon Bonaparte, who reigned in Naples (1806–1808) and Spain (1808–1813) as Joseph I
- Joseph I of Bulgaria (1877–1915)
- Joseph Wenzel I, Prince of Liechtenstein (1696–1772)
