= Lug, Beočin =

Lug Луг (Serbian) Lug (Slovak)
- Village (Selo)
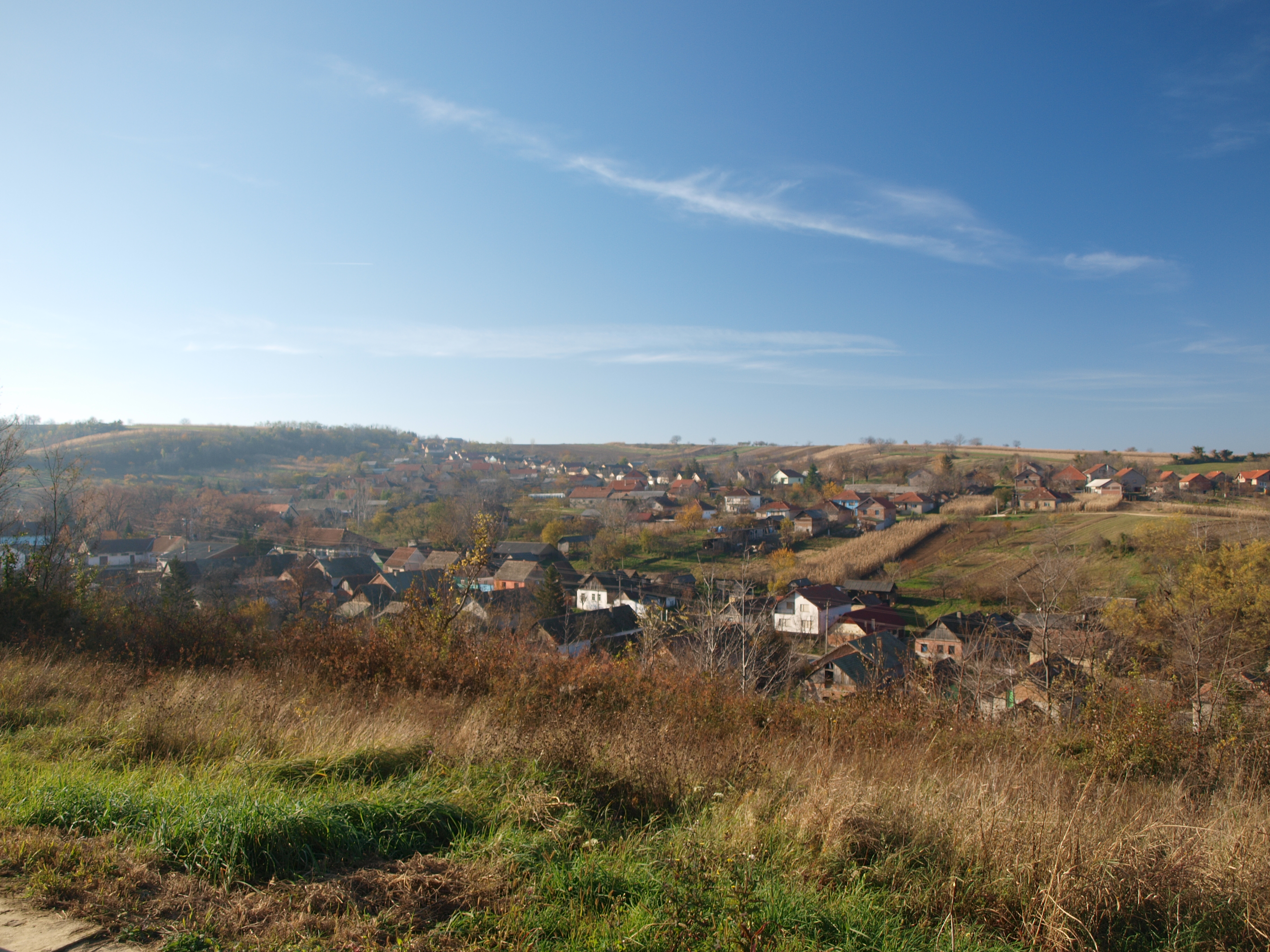
- Village of Lug.
- Interactive map of Lug
- Location within Vojvodina Location within Serbia Location within Europe
- Coordinates: 45°11′0″N 19°32′40″E
- Country: Serbia
- Province: Vojvodina
- District: South Bačka
- Municipality: Beočin

Population (2022)
  - Total: 529
- Time zone: UTC+1 (CET)
  - Summer (DST): UTC+2 (CEST)

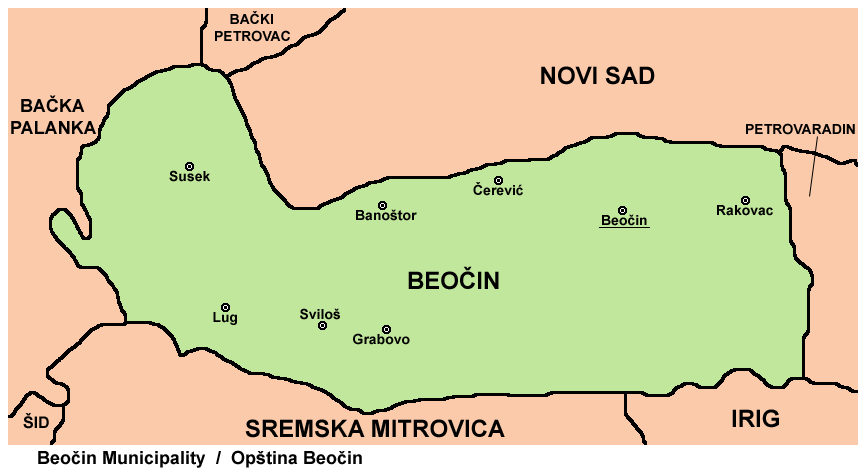
Map of the Beočin municipality, showing the location of Lug

Lug (Serbian Cyrillic: Луг) is a village in the municipality of Beočin, South Bačka District, Vojvodina, Serbia. It lies on the northwest slopes of Fruška gora mountain, in the region of Syrmia. The village has a population numbering 529 people (2022 census).

== History ==
The village originates from the late 19th century, when the local land owner Odescalchi employed people from Bački Petrovac and Gložan, Slovak villages across the Danube, in order to satisfy growing timber export. At first, they resided seasonally and returned to their villages. In order to ensure more permanent work force, they offered them cleared forest land as loan, at the location of the later village. In 1910, the village had 371 residents, and in the mid-century around 500.

== Demographics ==
=== Historical population ===
- 1961: 764
- 1971: 775
- 1981: 824
- 1991: 864
- 2002: 801
- 2011: 709
- 2022: 529

=== Ethnic groups ===
According to data from the 2022 census, ethnic groups in the village include:

- 485 (91.7%) Slovaks
- 21 (4.1%) Serbs
- Others/Undeclared/Unknown

== Economy ==
The residents are mostly engaged in agriculture, with a part working in nearby Beočin.

== Culture ==
Cultural society "Mladost", with folklore section, maintains the Slovak traditions and dances. The village twice hosted the Slovak cultural festival "Tancuj, tancuj", and their members acted in various folklore festivals across Europe.

== See also ==
- List of places in Serbia
- List of cities, towns and villages in Vojvodina
