= Sviloš =

Sviloš Свилош (Serbian)
- Village (Selo)
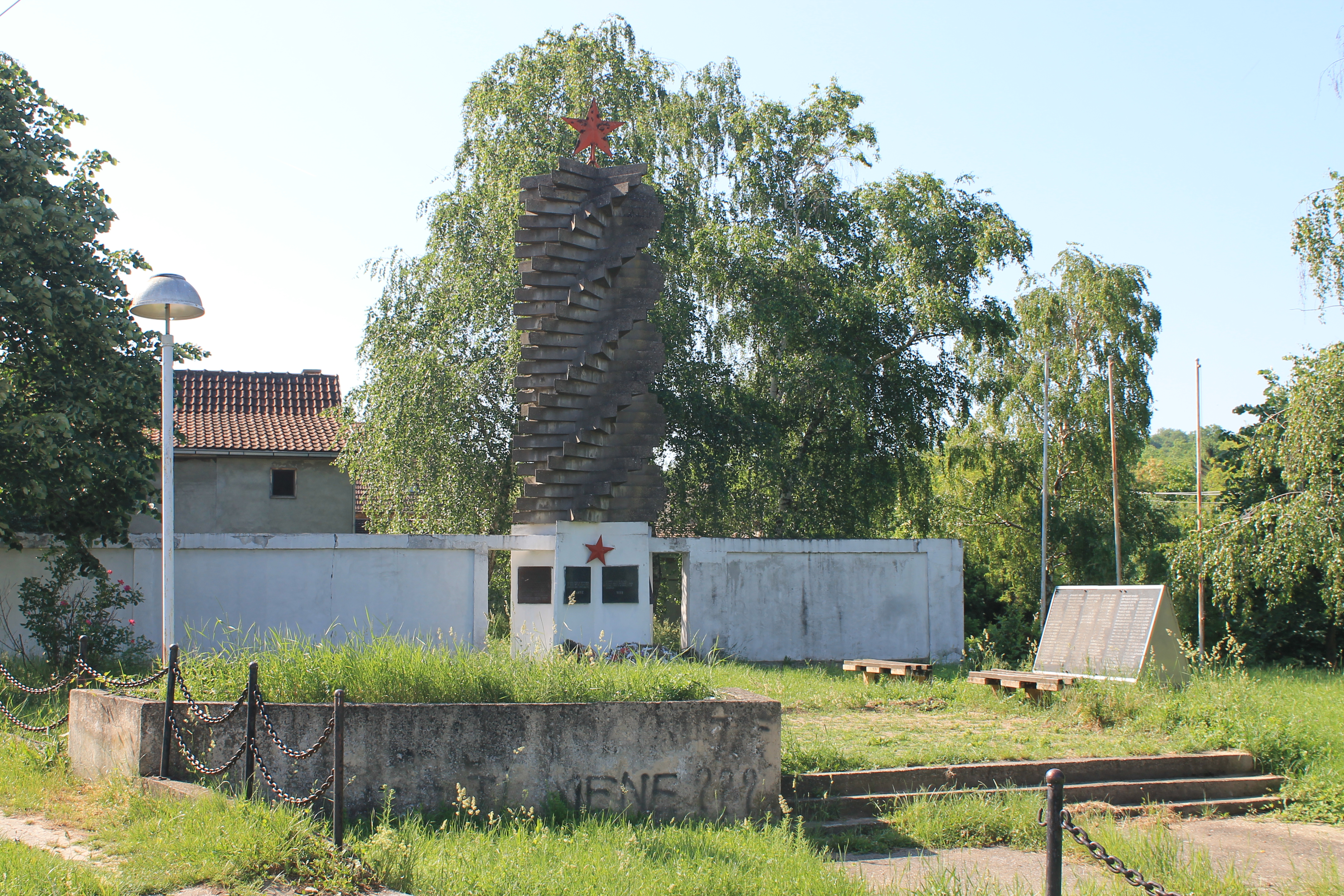
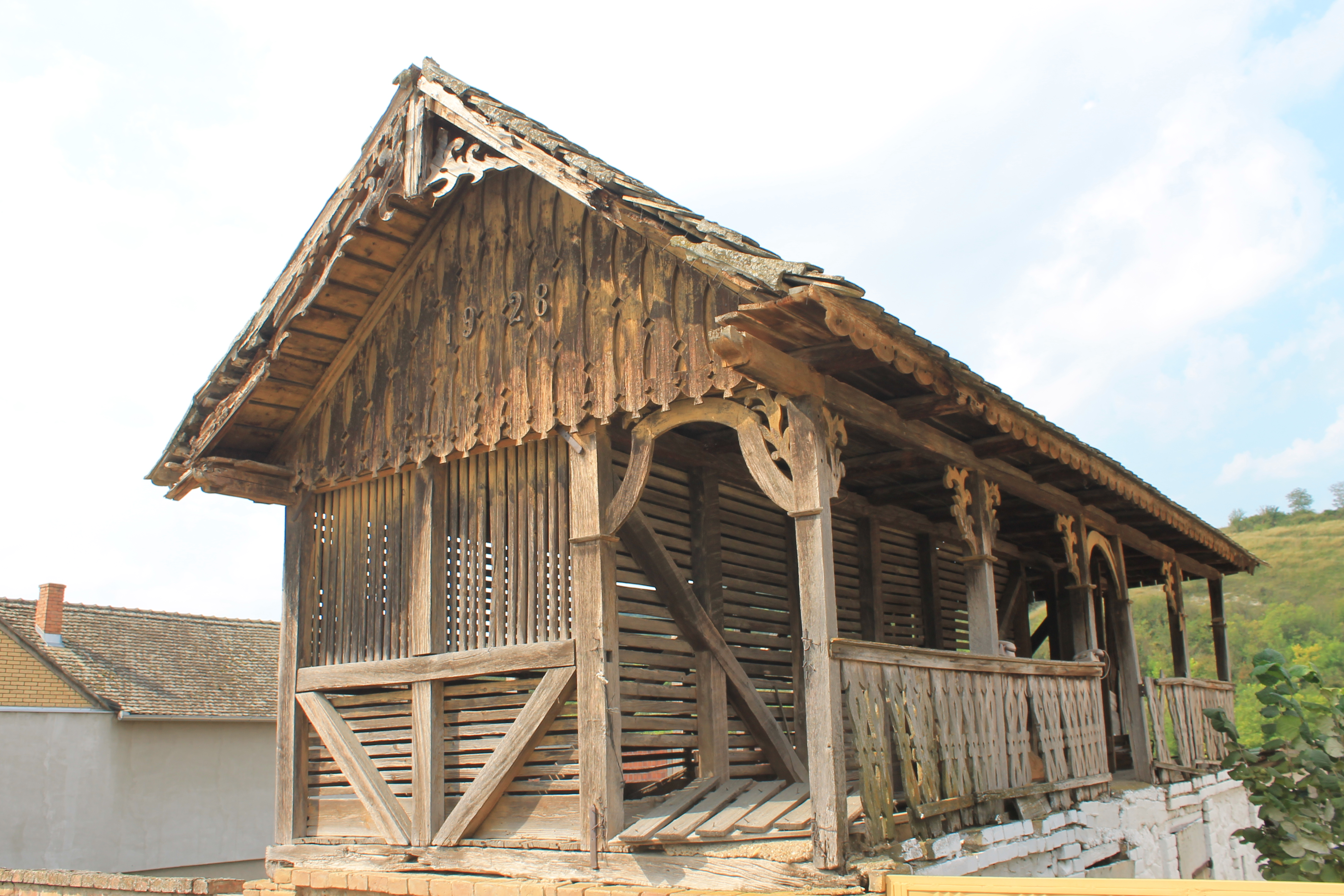
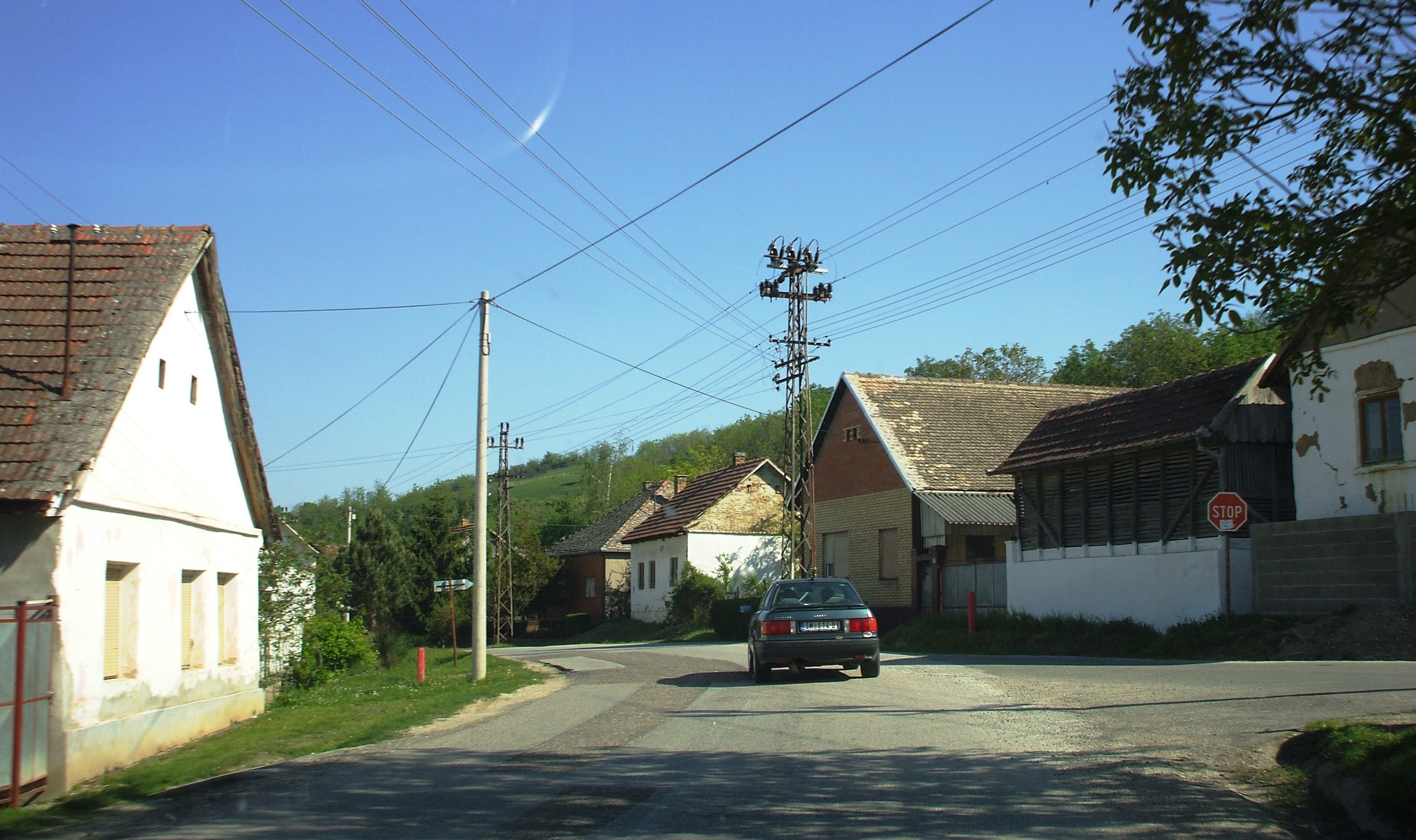
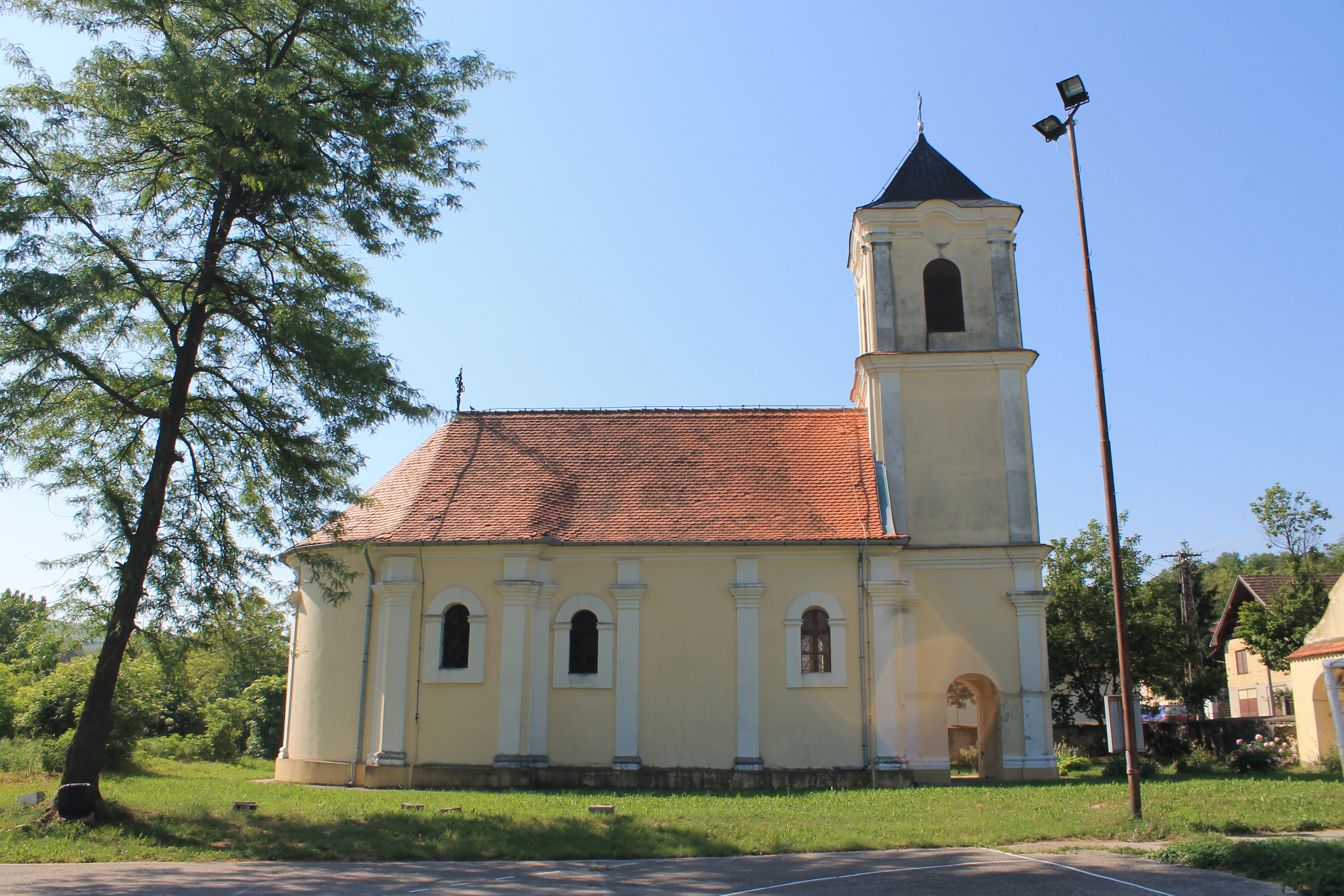
- Interactive map of Sviloš
- Location within Vojvodina Location within Serbia Location within Europe
- Coordinates: 45°11′N 19°35′E
- Country: Serbia
- Province: Vojvodina
- Region: Syrmia (Podunavlje)
- District: South Bačka
- Municipality: Beočin

Population (2022)
  - Total: 239
- Time zone: UTC+1 (CET)
  - Summer (DST): UTC+2 (CEST)

Sviloš (Serbian Cyrillic: Свилош) is a village in Serbia. It is situated in the Beočin municipality, in the Vojvodina province. Although, the village is geographically located in Syrmia, it is part of the South Bačka District. The village has a Serb ethnic majority and its population numbering 239 people (2022 census).

== History ==
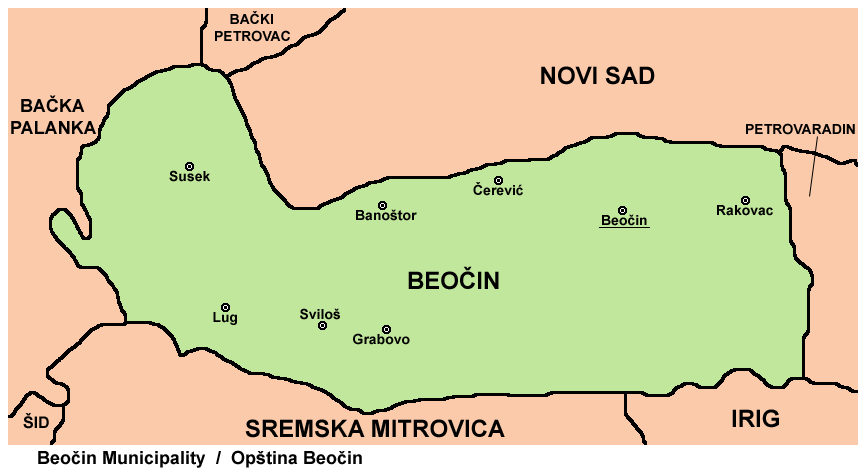
Map of the Beočin municipality, showing the location of Sviloš

Following Ottoman retreat from the region, the Lordship of Ilok and Upper Syrmia was established, and the village became part of its domain.

During the Axis occupation in World War II, 116 civilians were killed in Sviloš by fascists.

== Historical population ==
- 1961: 417
- 1971: 419
- 1981: 367
- 1991: 347
- 2002: 362
- 2011: 291
- 2022: 239

== See also ==
- Church of the Presentation of the Theotokos, Sviloš
- List of places in Serbia
- List of cities, towns and villages in Vojvodina
