= Bosut =

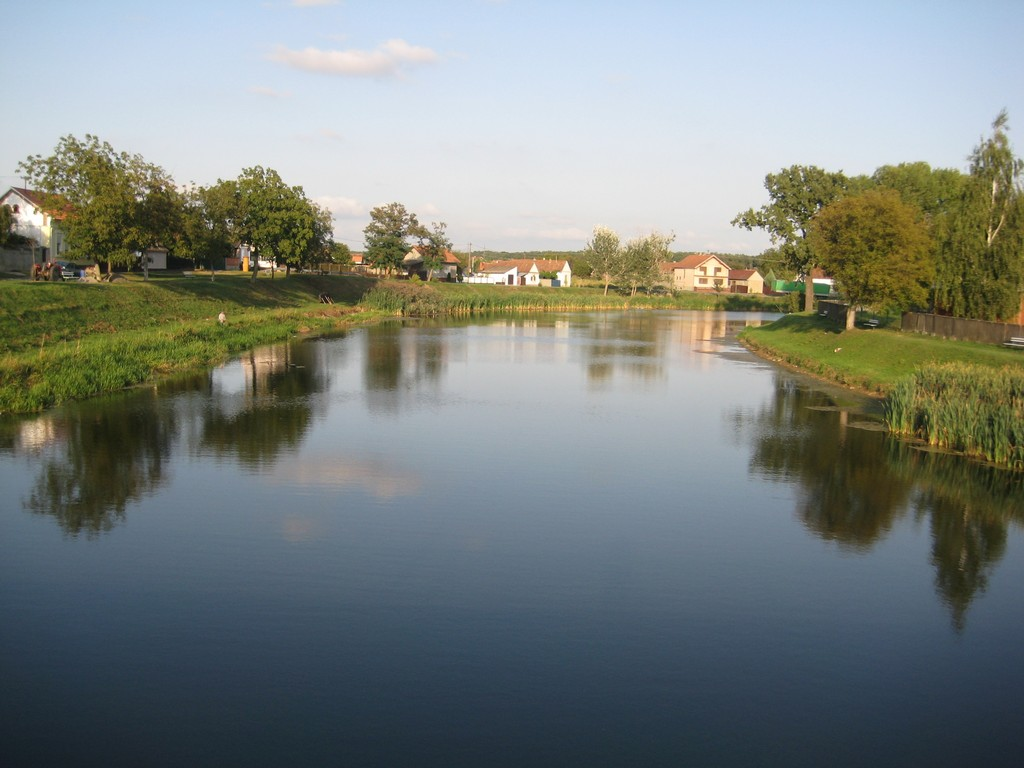
- Bosut between Rokovci and Andrijaševci

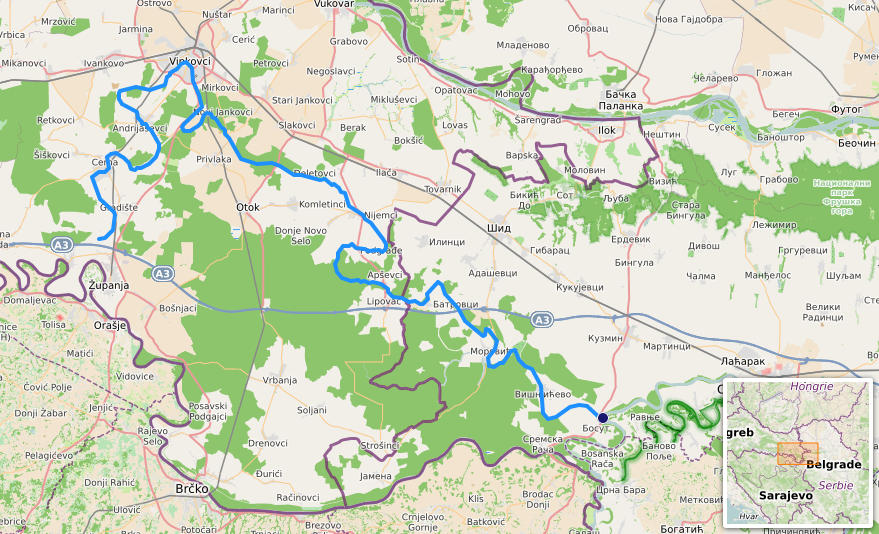
- Bosut location

Location
- Countries: Croatia; Serbia

Physical characteristics
- Source
  - location: near Cerna, Croatia
  - coordinates: 45°05′46″N 18°40′36″E
- Mouth
  - location: Sava at the village of Bosut, Serbia
  - coordinates: 44.9411°N 19.3706°E
- Length: 186 km (116 mi)
- Basin size: 2,943 km^{2} (1,136 sq mi)

Basin features
- Progression: Sava→ Danube→ Black Sea

The Bosut (Serbian Cyrillic: Босут) is a river in the Syrmia region of eastern Croatia and northwestern Serbia. It is a 186 km long, slow and meandering left tributary of the Sava river.

The riverbed begins near the left embankment of the Sava river between Županja and Štitar (45°05′46″N 18°40′36″E), which in the past was an outflow channel, and a connection with the Sava. Some 2,400 m (1.5 mi) farther, the Bosut gets its first water from the Berava river (45°06′59″N 18°40′45″E). The narrow riverbed widens in Cerna, where it receives the water of the Biđ.

The river continues north toward the city of Vinkovci, the only major city on its course, and then turns southeast. Near Lipovac it receives its major tributary Spačva, and then enters Serbia near Batrovci. In its lower course, Bosut flows through a forested area in the Spačva region.

The river is known for its abundance of fish. It is thought that its name derives from the Indo-European root *bhogj, meaning "to flow". The same root is seen in hydronym "Bosna".

== Course ==
=== Headwaters ===
Since the construction of the Sava river embankment between Štitar and Županja, what used to be a connection with the Sava river and its outflow channel is now a 2,400 m (1.5 mi) bay called Kanal Bosut. There is no significant flow in the channel, so the Bosut River gets its first water from the Berava river, which originates south of Velika Kopanica, meanders eastwards near Gundinci and Babina Greda, and turns north near Gradište, south of Cerna. It is believed that Bosut was a branch of the Sava or that there was a Roman canal that led from the Sava to the Berava. The narrow riverbed widens in Cerna where the Bosut receives the water of the Biđ, a 66 km (41 mi) long tributary originating in central Slavonia region, on the southern slopes of the Dilj mountain. The origin and shape of Bosut, Biđ and their right tributaries are mainly due to the high waters of the Sava and its tributaries Bosna and Drina. The outflow named Bosut was created in the last bend of the great meanders of the Sava, and the surges of water caused the flow to stretch all the way to Vinkovci.

=== Downstream of Cerna ===
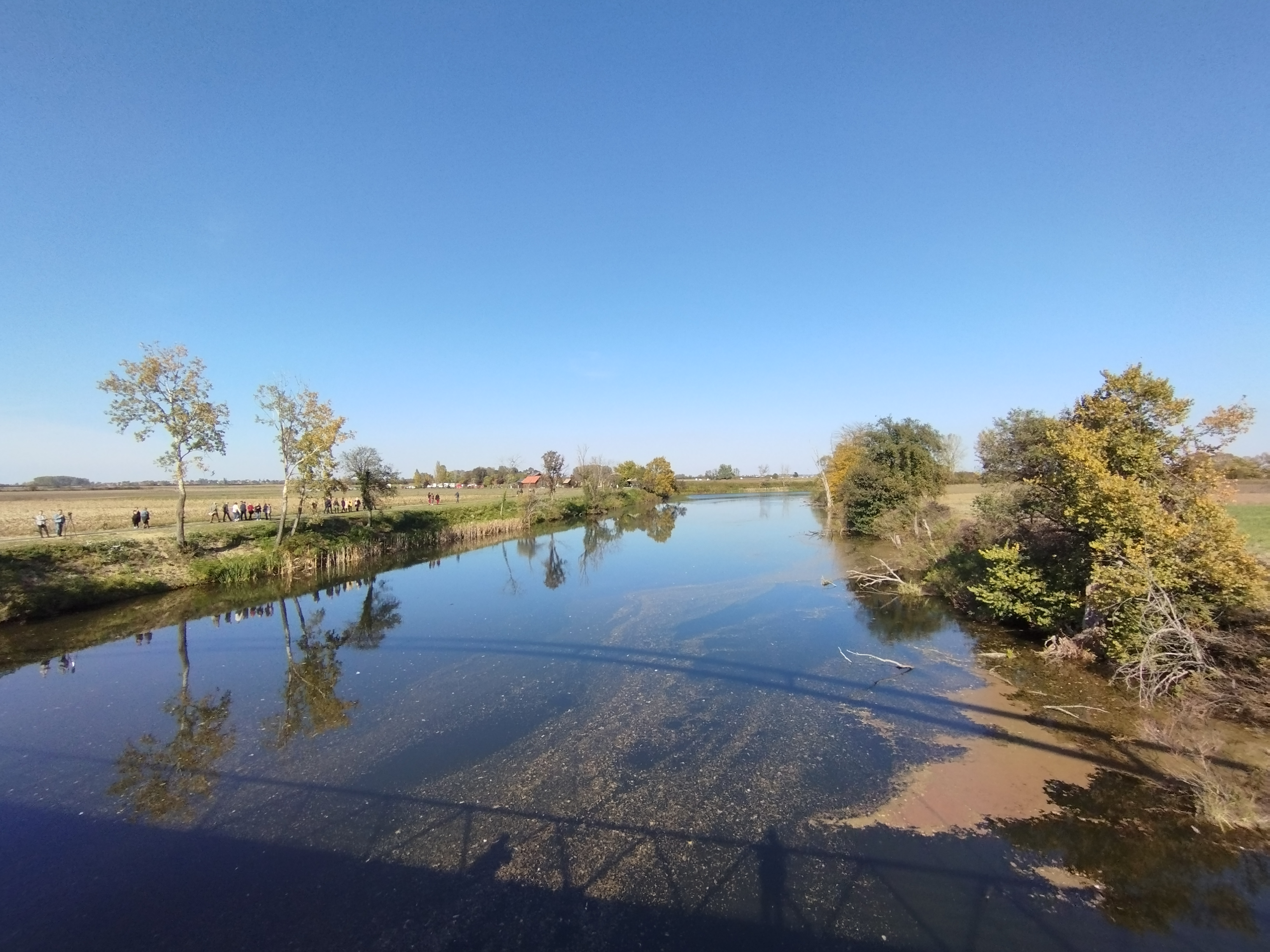
Bosut at Sopotac near Nijemci.

Turning north from Cerna, the river flows into the region of Syrmia, and the villages of Andrijaševci and Rokovci, reaching the biggest settlement on its course, the city of Vinkovci. From there, the river turns to the southeast, which is the direction it will follow for the rest of its course, except for a large U-bend south of Vinkovci. It passes through Kunjevci, Nijemci, Podgrađe, Apševci and Lipovac, where it receives the river Spačva from the right, and after the flow of 151 km through Croatia, crosses the Serbian border.

The Bosut enters Serbia at the village of Batrovci and flows through the southwesternmost part of the province of Vojvodina. It continues through the villages of Morović (where it receives the river Studva from the right, its major tributary in Serbia) and Višnjićevo, makes a turn north of Sremska Rača and, after 28 km in Serbia, empties into the Sava at the village of Bosut. A Slezen pond, near Morović, is located in the river's valley.

== Characteristics ==
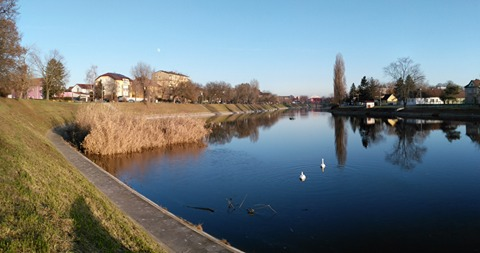
The Bosut in Vinkovci

The Bosut belongs to the Black Sea drainage basin, with its own drainage area of 3,097 km^{2} (1,196 sq mi) (of which 2,572 km^{2} (993 sq mi) in Croatia). For some 40 km it is navigable for smaller vessels.

The river is known as meandering and extremely slow, especially during the summer when the water level can be very low. That's why some suggest the origin of the name deriving from the Turkish language: bosh for empty or desolate and sut for water. Due to such a flow, the river has a specific ecosystem, abundant in fish, marsh plants and a deep deposit of silt from their rotting.

The declination in its basin is very small, less than 10 m from Vinkovci until its mouth. Bosut is known as 'the river that flows backwards', because sometimes, with strong winds and being so slow, it appears as if the water is flowing backwards.

It is also known as a region with the highest evaporation in both Croatia and Serbia. In its lower course, Bosut flows through a forested area in the region of Spačva.

== See also ==
- Bosut culture
