= Morović Fortress =

Fortress in the village of Morović, Serbia

- Тврђава Моровић (Serbian)
- Near Morović, Vojvodina in Serbia
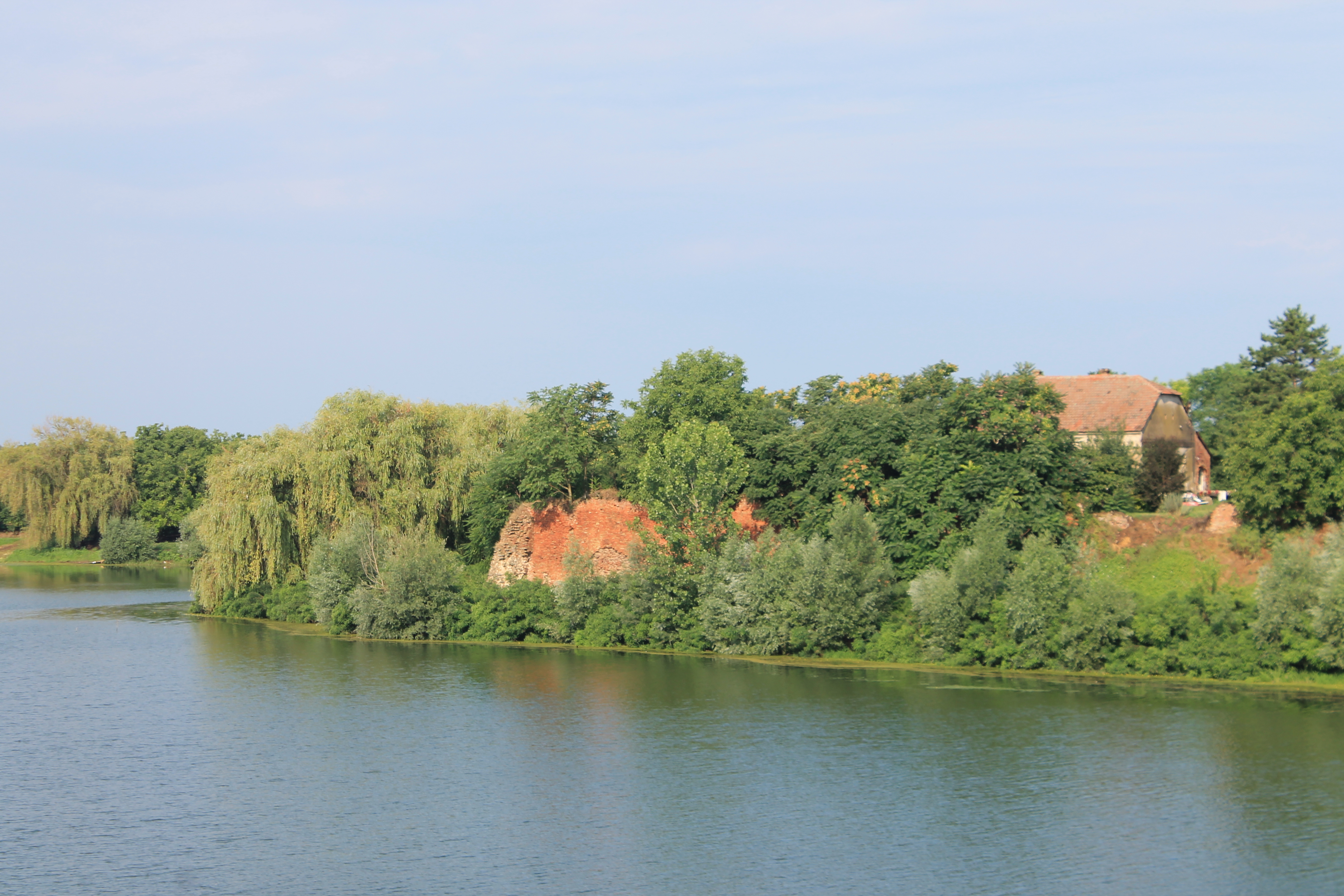
- Morović Castle

Site information
- Type: fortified castle

Location
- Coordinates: 45°00′24″N 19°13′3.5″E

Site history
- Built: XII century-XIV century

Garrison information
- Designations: protected material cultural heritage

Cultural Heritage of Serbia
- Type: Cultural Monument of Great Importance
- Designated: 30 December 1997
- Reference no.: СК 1355

Morović Fortress (Serbian: Тврђава Моровић) is a fortress in the village of Morović, Šid municipality, Vojvodina, Serbia.

== Background ==
The fortress was built in the mid-12th century and was subsequently property of Đurađ Branković with some authors dating it only to 14th century rule of Maróti János. It lies on elevated ground where the Studva flows into the Bosut river. After the extinction of the Maróti family, it was acquired in 1484 by John Corvinus, the illegitimate son of the Hungarian king Matthias. The Ottoman Empire conquered the fortress in 1528 or 1589. After the retreat of the Ottoman forces and the signing of the 1718 Treaty of Passarowitz the fortress lost its military and strategic importance and slowly began to decline.

== See also ==
- Church of Saint Mary, Morović
