= Spačva =

Spačva can refer to:

- Spačva basin, a small geographical region in eastern Croatia
- Spačva (river), a river in the same region of Croatia, affluent of Bosut
