= Morović =

Morović Моровић (Serbian)
- Village (Selo)
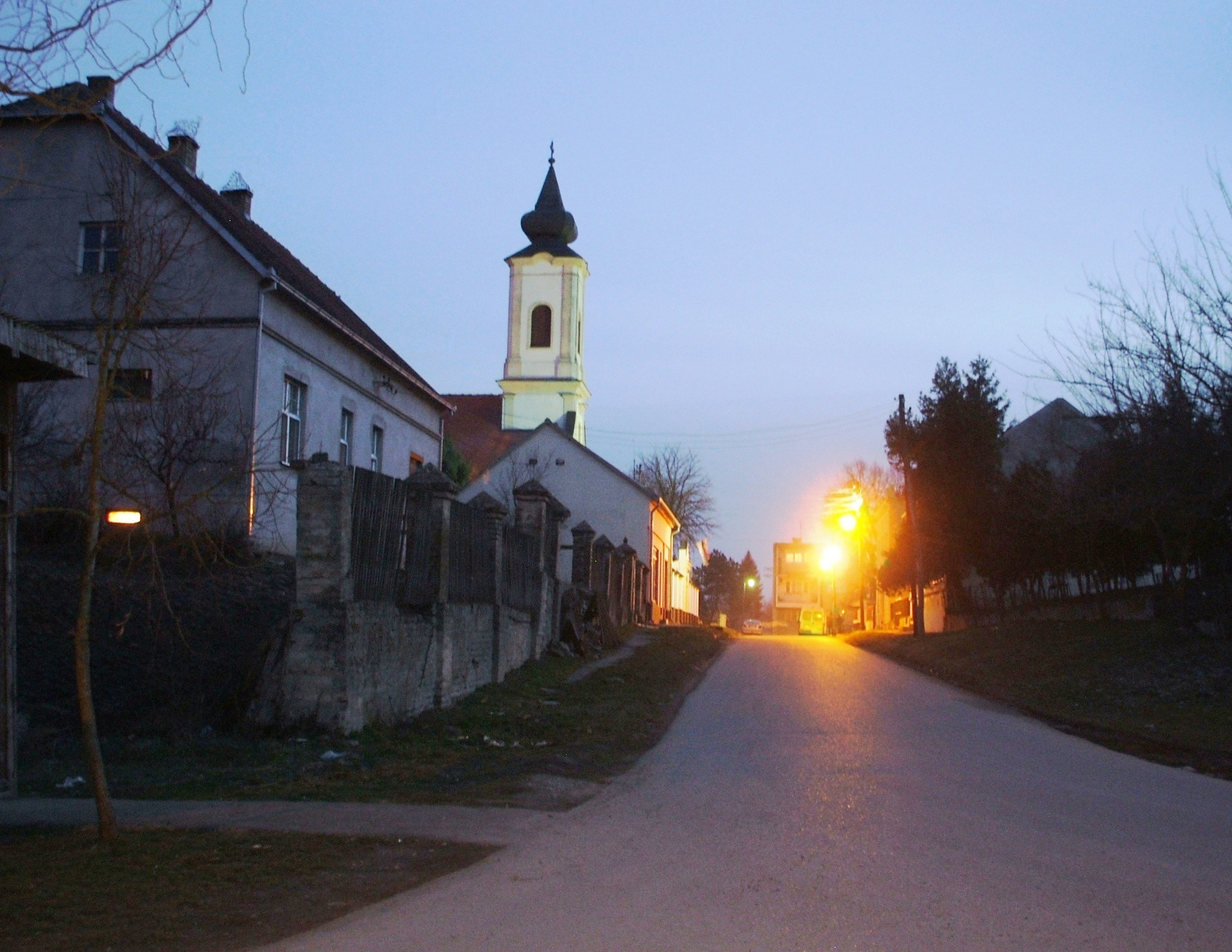
- Orthodox Church

- Location within Vojvodina Location within Serbia Location within Europe
- Coordinates: 44°59′N 19°12′E
- Country: Serbia
- Province: Vojvodina
- Region: Syrmia
- District: Srem
- Municipality: Šid

Area
  - Total: 93.47 km^{2} (36.09 sq mi)
- Elevation: 79 m (259 ft)

Population (2011)
  - Total: 1,744
  - Density: 18.66/km^{2} (48.33/sq mi)
- Time zone: UTC+1 (CET)
  - Summer (DST): UTC+2 (CEST)
- Postal code: 22 245

Morović (Serbian Cyrillic: Моровић) is a village located in the municipality of Šid, Srem District, Vojvodina, Serbia. As of 2011 census, it has a population of 1,744 inhabitants.

== History ==
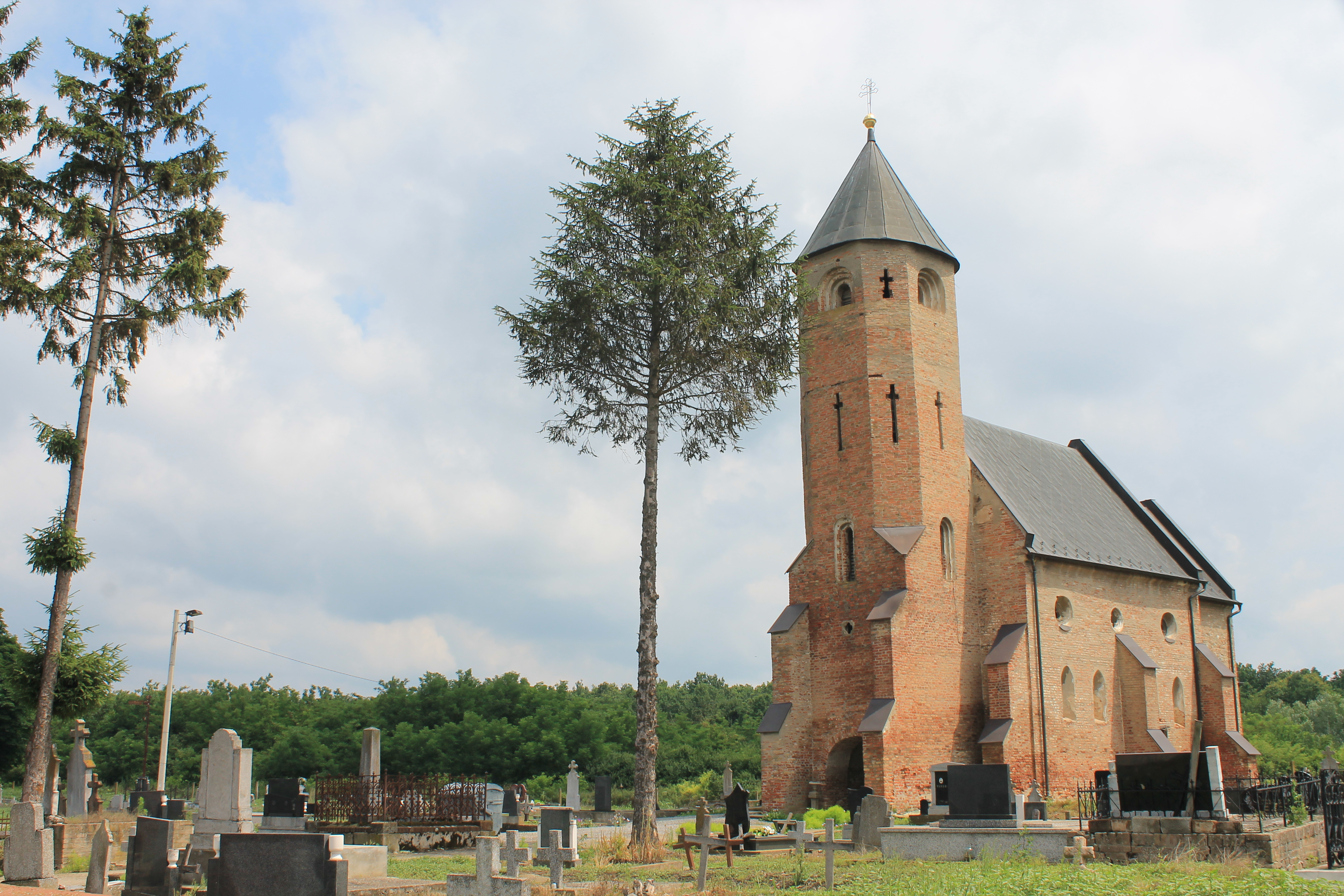
Roman Catholic Church of Saint Mary, Morović

In the Middle Ages, Morović was a notable town, today known as the Morović Fortress. It was built by Serbian despot Stefan Štiljanović in 1498. Štiljanović used Morović as his residence until he moved to Baranya, escaping the Ottomans.

The Roman Catholic church of Saint Mary from the 13th century, built in both Romanesque and Gothic styles is a very noteworthy monument. It is located on a cemetery north of the village. The Serbian Orthodox church of the Nativity of Mary and the Roman Catholic church of Saint Roch are also located in the village.

=== Historical population ===
- 1961: 2,110
- 1971: 2,292
- 1981: 2,196
- 1991: 2,105
- 2002: 2,164
- 2011: 1,744

== Geography ==
Morović is located at the confluence of the Bosut and Studva rivers and is surrounded by opulent oak forests. The Adaševci interchange on the A3 motorway is located to the north of the village. The nearby village of Jamena can only be accessed by traveling through Morović.

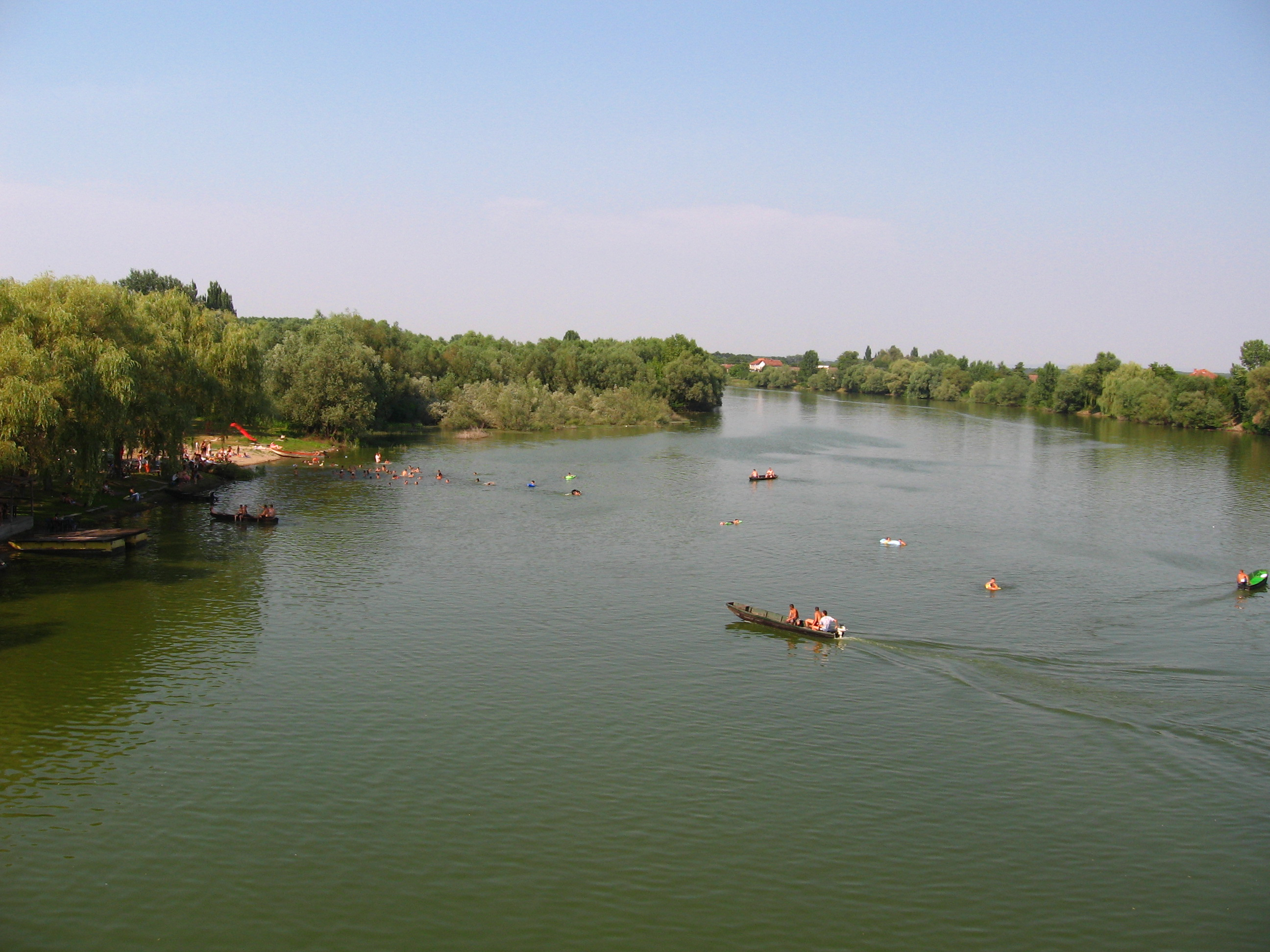
Swimmers on the Bosut river

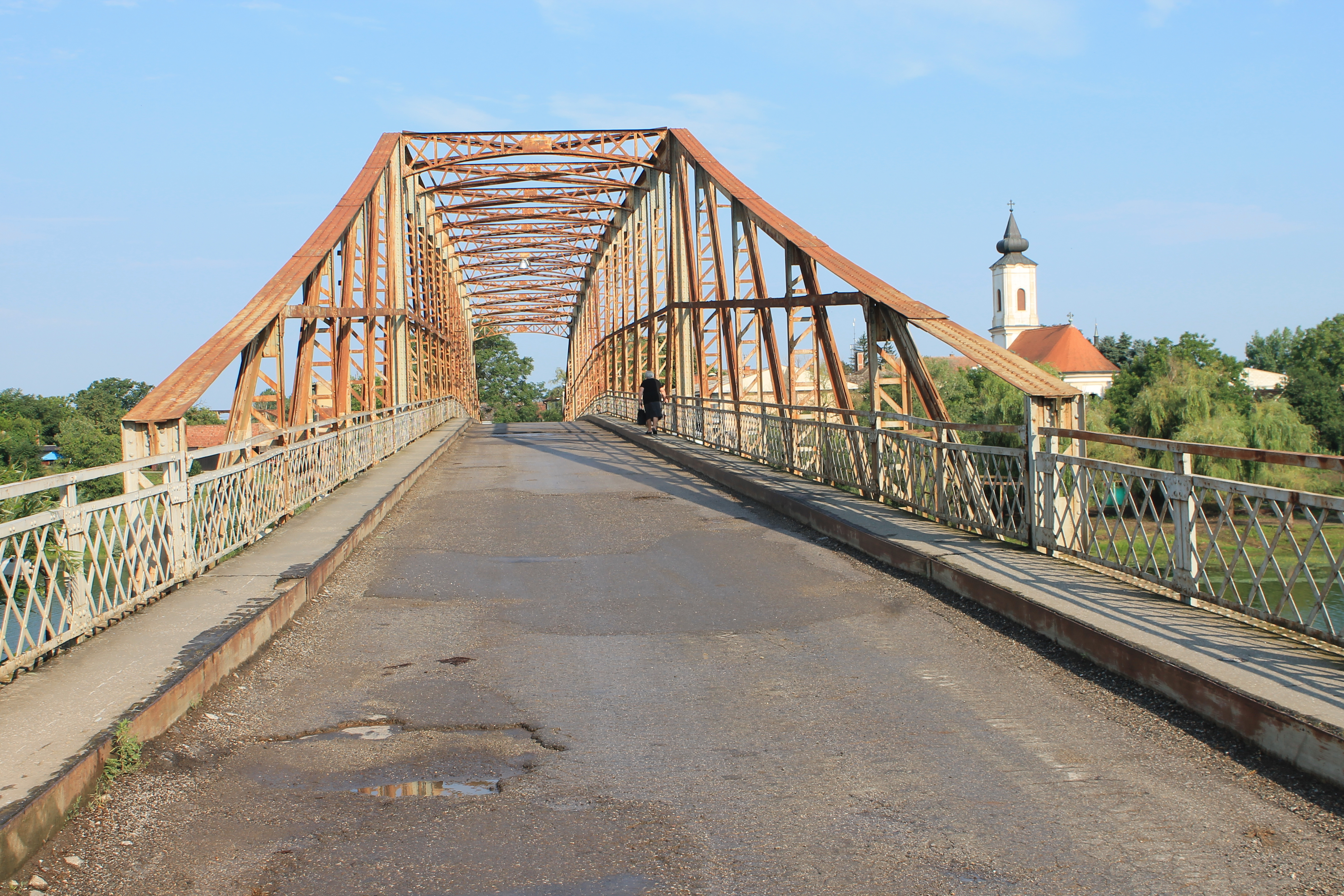
Bridge over the Bosut river with the Serbian Orthodox church in the background

== Sport and Hunting ==
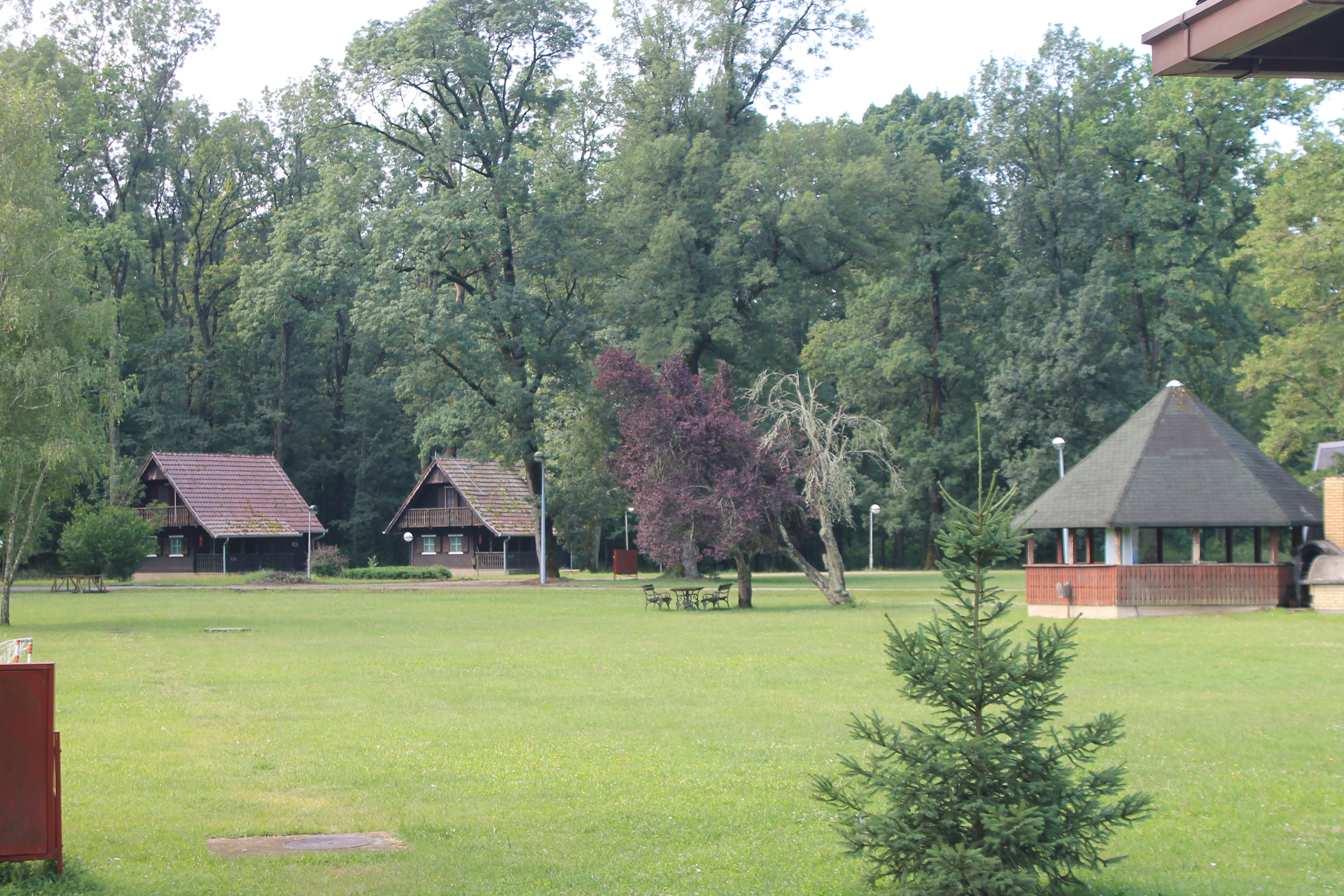

Morović is known for its hunting area, often referred to as Tito's hunting ground, which was one of his hunting grounds during the time of Yugoslavia. In recent years it has attracted international hunters and has facilities and accommodation for hunting. The area is home to red deer, fallow deer, wild boar and pheasants. It covers 2,500 hectares of oak forest, with some oaks more than a century old. At the center of the reserve are Tito's hunting lodge, which has eight beds, and a second lodge with about twenty beds. The area also hosts an annual fishing tournament and is popular with anglers because of the surrounding rivers.

The local football club is FK Jedinstvo Morović, it currently competes in the Vojvođanska liga - Jug which is the equivalent fourth division.

== Notable people ==
- Dušan Popović (1877–1958) represented Morović in the Croatian Parliament from 1906 to 1913, while Syrmia was part of the Austro-Hungarian Empire.

== See also ==
- List of places in Serbia
- List of cities, towns and villages in Vojvodina
- Spačva basin
