= Rokovci =

Coordinates: 45°14′N 18°45′E

- Village (Selo)
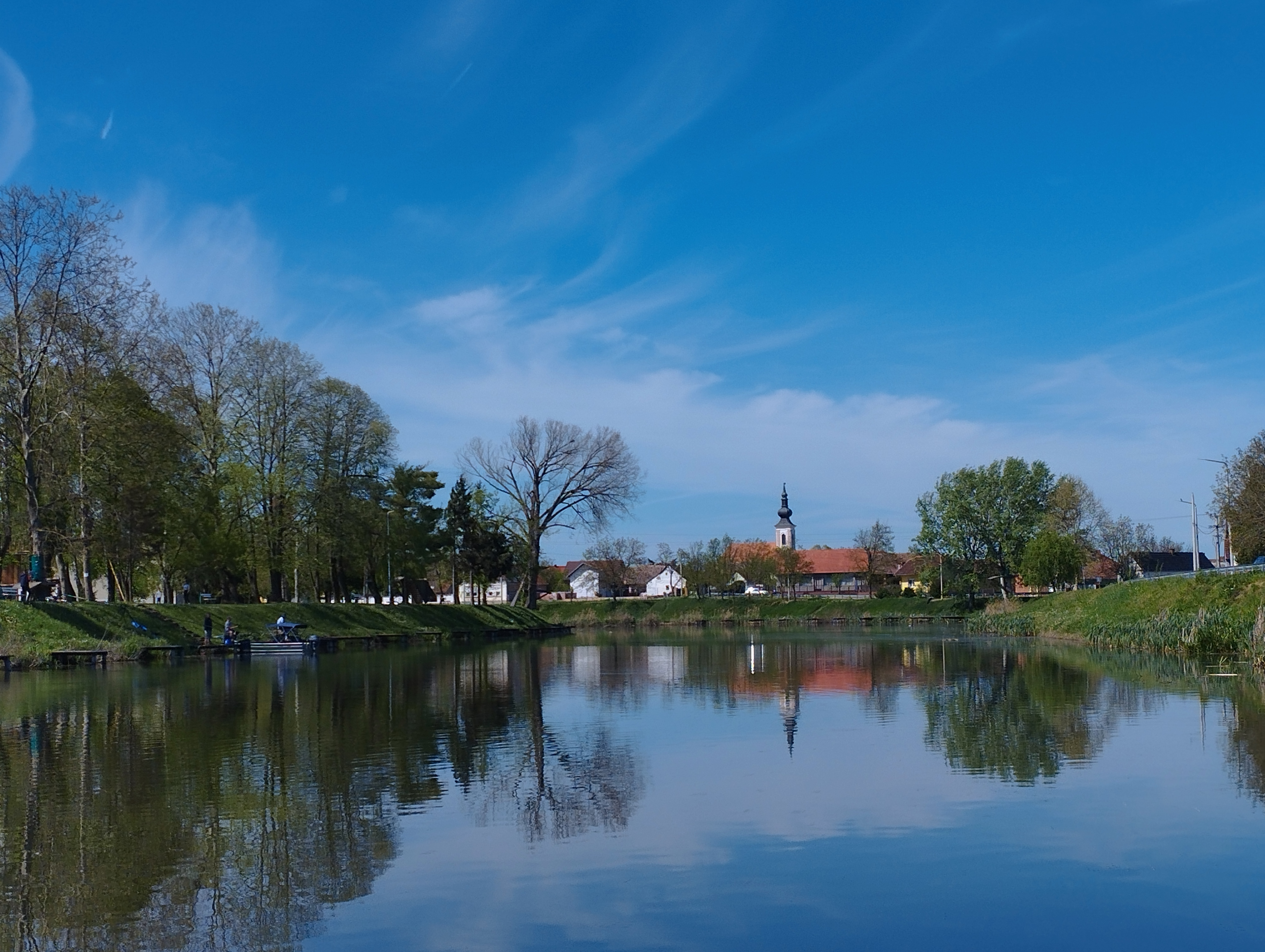
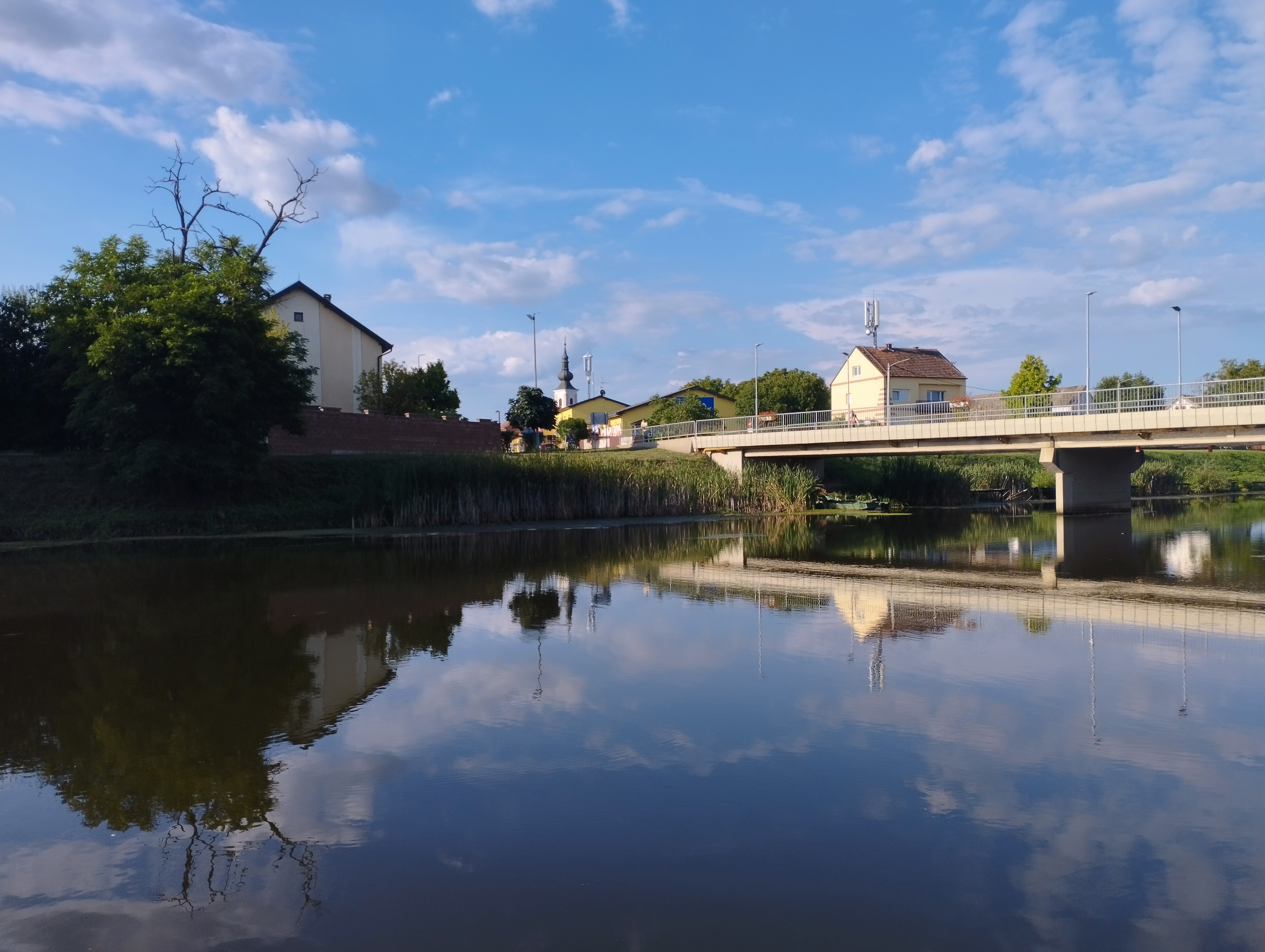
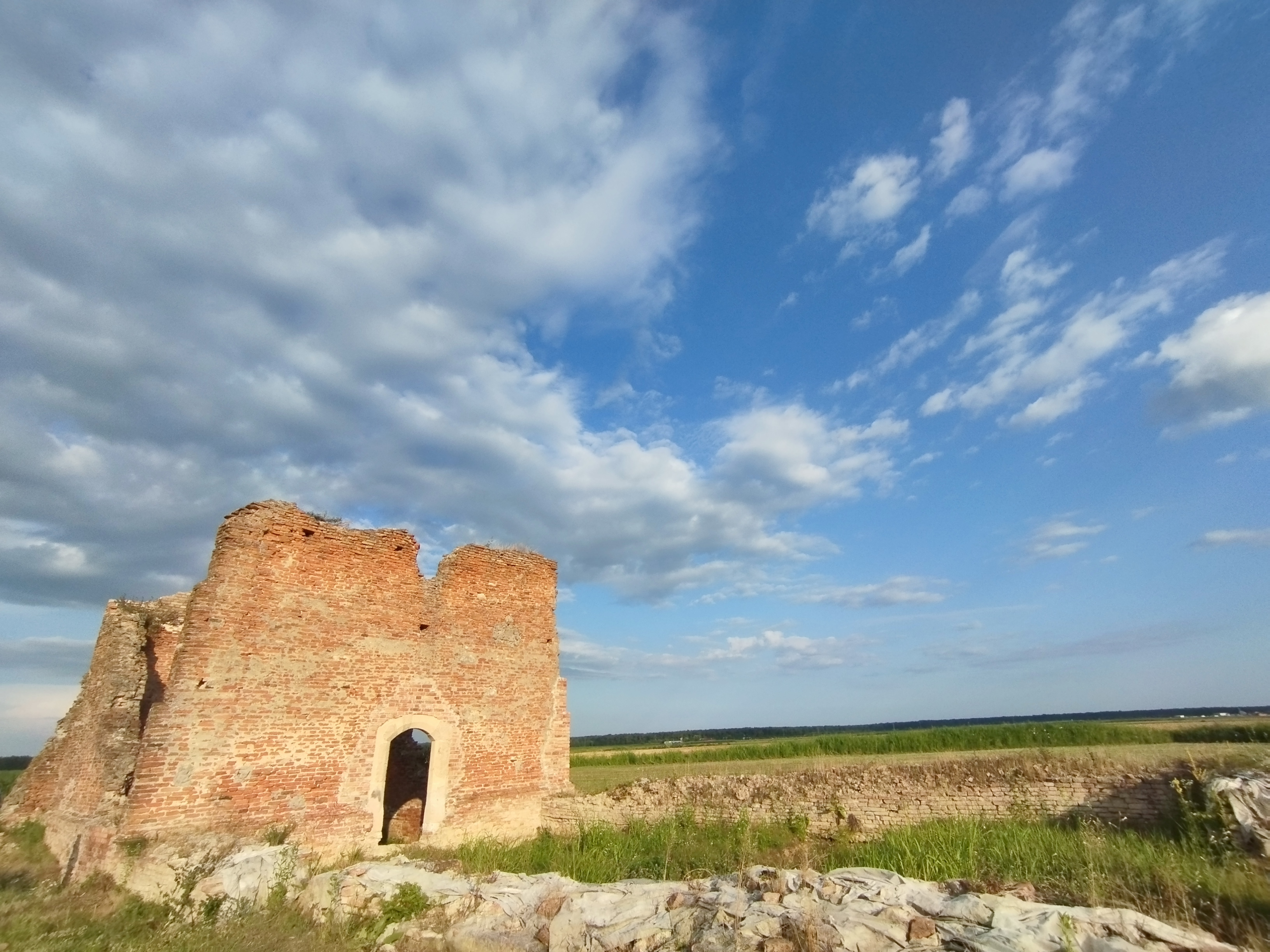
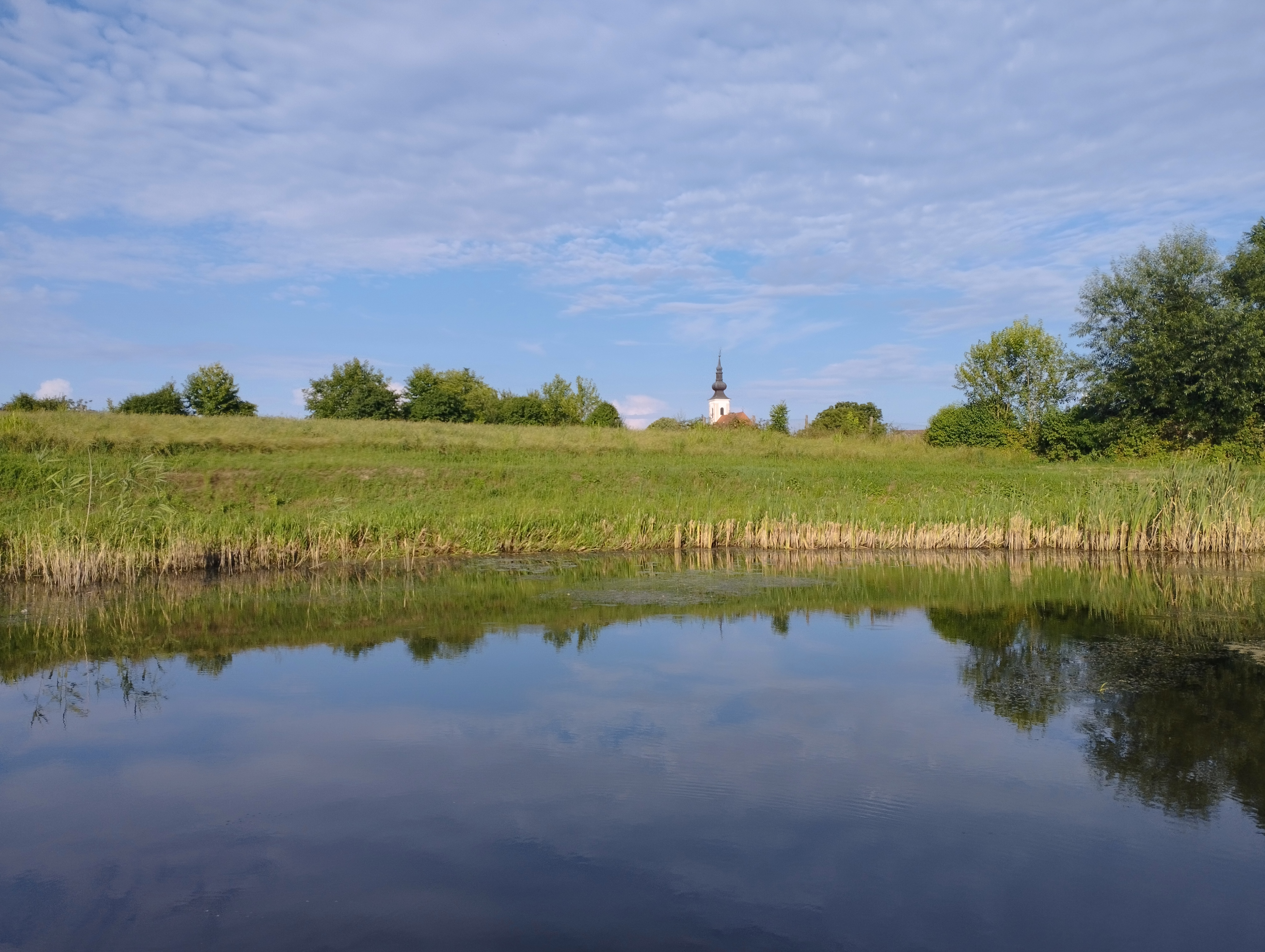
- Rokovci from the Bosut river & Rokovci fortification

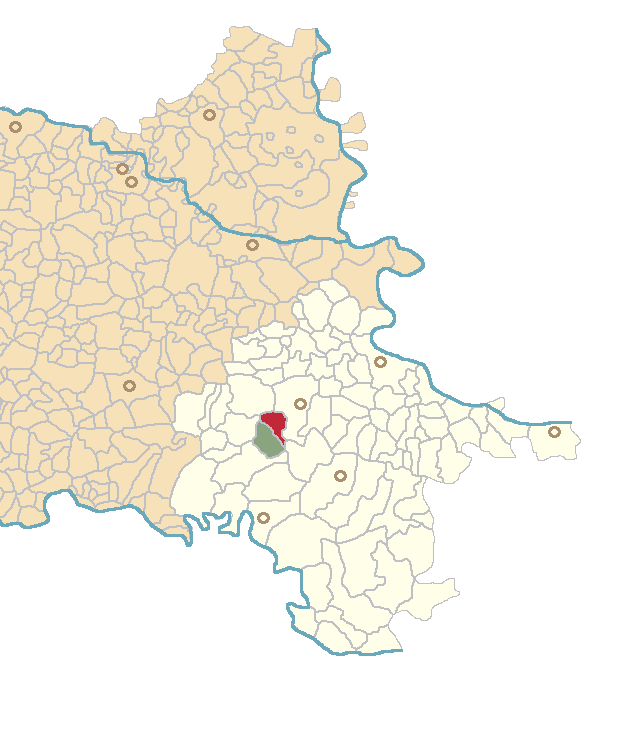
- Country: Croatia
- County: Vukovar-Syrmia
- Municipality: Andrijaševci

Area
  - Total: 5.8 sq mi (15.0 km^{2})

Population (2021)
  - Total: 1,692
  - Density: 292/sq mi (113/km^{2})
- Time zone: UTC+1 (CET)
  - Summer (DST): UTC+2 (CEST)
- Vehicle registration: VK

Rokovci (Hungarian: Rokovce) is a village in eastern Croatia in the Andrijaševci Municipality of Vukovar-Syrmia County.

== Name ==
The name of the village in Croatian is plural.

== See also ==
- Spačva basin
