= Nijemci =

- Municipality
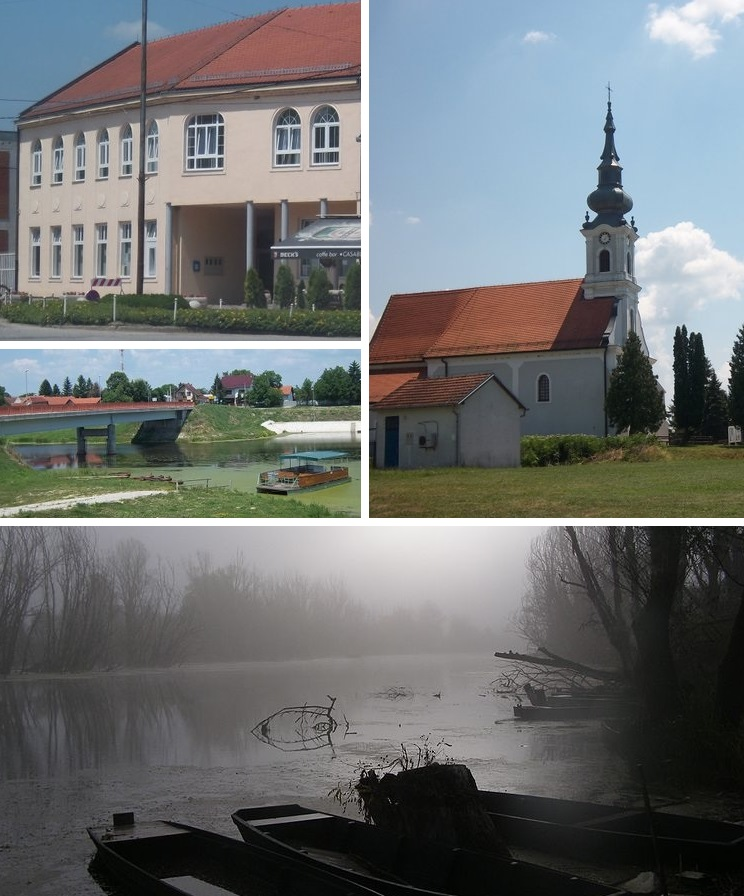
- Nijemci

- Flag Seal

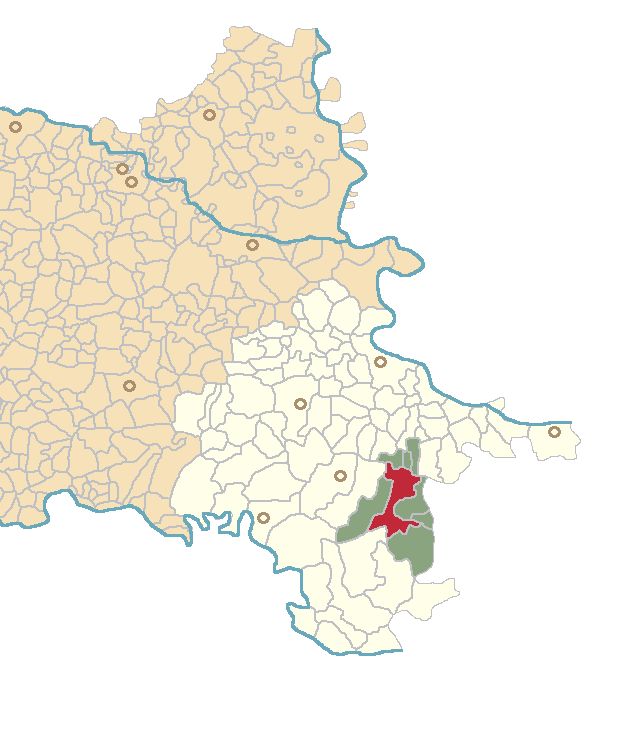

- Location in Croatia Nijemci (Croatia) Nijemci (Europe)
- Coordinates: 45°8′N 19°2′E
- Country: Croatia
- Region: Syrmia (Spačva basin)
- County: Vukovar-Syrmia County

Area
  - Municipality: 224.8 km^{2} (86.8 sq mi)
  - Urban: 53.8 km^{2} (20.8 sq mi)

Population (2021)
  - Municipality: 3,526
  - Density: 15.69/km^{2} (40.62/sq mi)
  - Urban: 1,330
  - Urban density: 24.7/km^{2} (64.0/sq mi)
- Time zone: UTC+1 (CET)
  - Summer (DST): UTC+2 (CEST)
- Postal code: Nijemci 32 245; Lipovac 32 246; Đeletovci 32 244; Donje Novo Selo 32 245; Banovci 32 247; Podgrađe 32 245; Apševci 32 246; Vinkovački Banovci 32 247
- Area code: 32
- Vehicle registration: VK
- Website: nijemci.hr

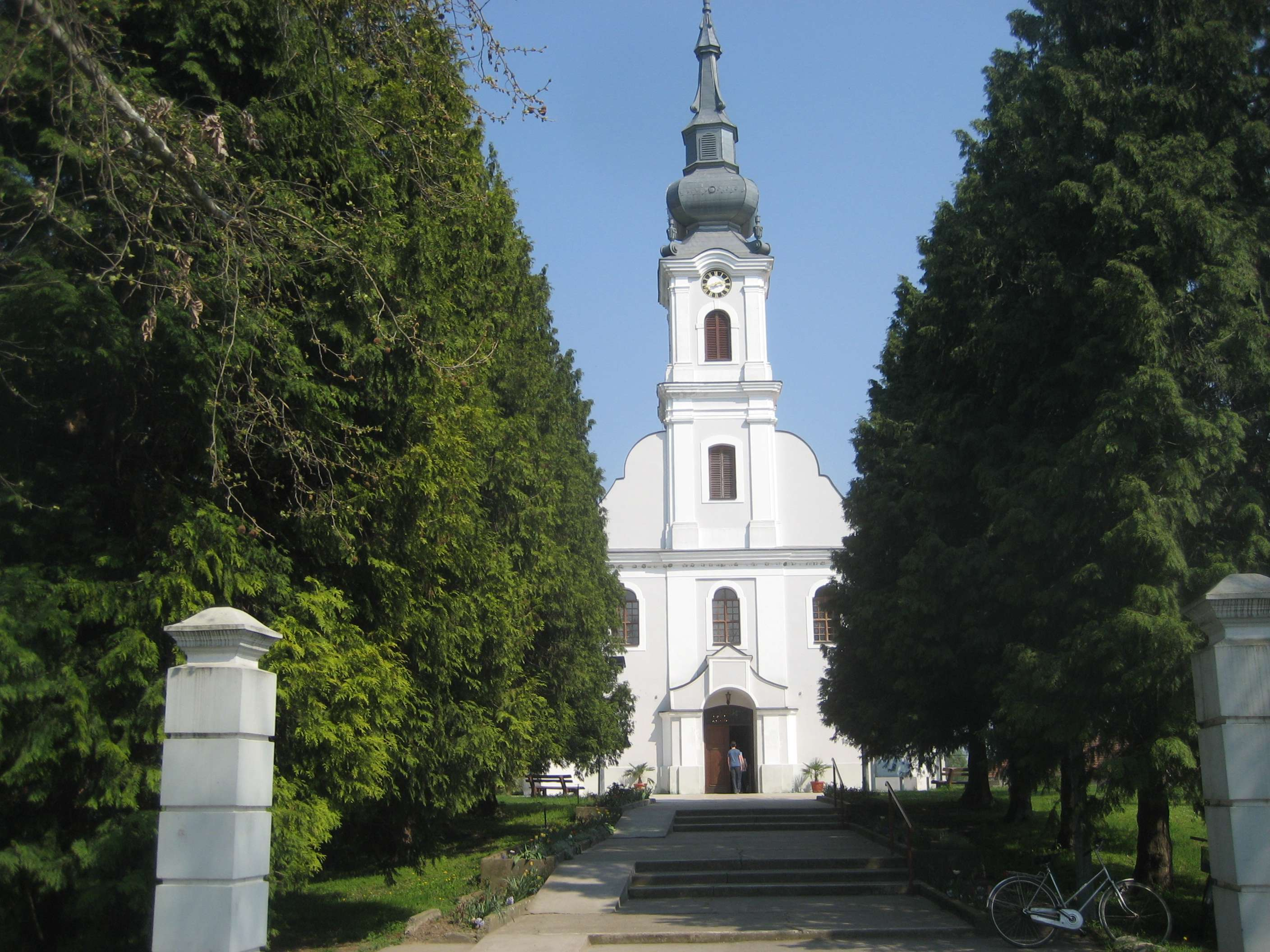
St Katarina Church, Nijemci

Nijemci (Serbian: Нијемци, Hungarian: Csótnémeti) is a village and a municipality in the Vukovar-Syrmia County in Croatia.

In the 2011 census, there were 4,705 inhabitants in the municipality, 87.78% of which were Croats. The second largest ethnic group are Serbs who live mainly in two villages in the north of the municipality. There are only 0.06% aforementioned Germans living in this municipality.

== Languages and names ==
The village's name means "Germans" in Croatian. The root of the word "nijem" means "mute", and is a known Slavonic ethnonym for the name of the Germans.

Before World War II there was a substantial Danube Swabian minority resident here. They were expelled from Yugoslavia along with other ethnic Germans after the Second World War.

In villages Šidski Banovci and Vinkovački Banovci, along with Croatian which is official in the whole country, as a second official language has been introduced Serbian language with Cyrillic script.

== History ==
Following Ottoman retreat from the region, the Lordship of Vukovar was established, and the village became part of its domain in 1702 until 1737 when it was transferred back to Slavonian Military Frontier.

== Geography ==
Municipality is located in the historical regions of Syrmia. Municipality's total area is 224.68 km^{2}. Rivers Spačva i Bosut flows through the municipality. The village of Nijemci is connected with the rest of the country via the D57 road while other important transit routes in the municipality include A3 motorway, M104 railway and the D46 state road. The territory of the municipality is completely flat very fertile black soil.

=== Climate and weather ===
Nijemci municipality has a moderately warm and rainy continental climate as defined by the Köppen climate classification. Due to the influence of continentality temperature differences within one year are more pronounced than in the rest of country.

== Population ==
Municipality of Nijemci have a 4705 inhabitants according to 2011 Census. 1605 were living in the village of Nijemci at that time.

=== Minority councils ===
Directly elected minority councils and representatives are tasked with consulting tasks for the local or regional authorities in which they are advocating for minority rights and interests, integration into public life and participation in the management of local affairs. At the 2023 Croatian national minorities councils and representatives elections Serbs of Croatia fulfilled legal requirements to elect 10 members minority councils of the Nijemci Municipality yet only 7 members were elected in the end.

== Economy ==
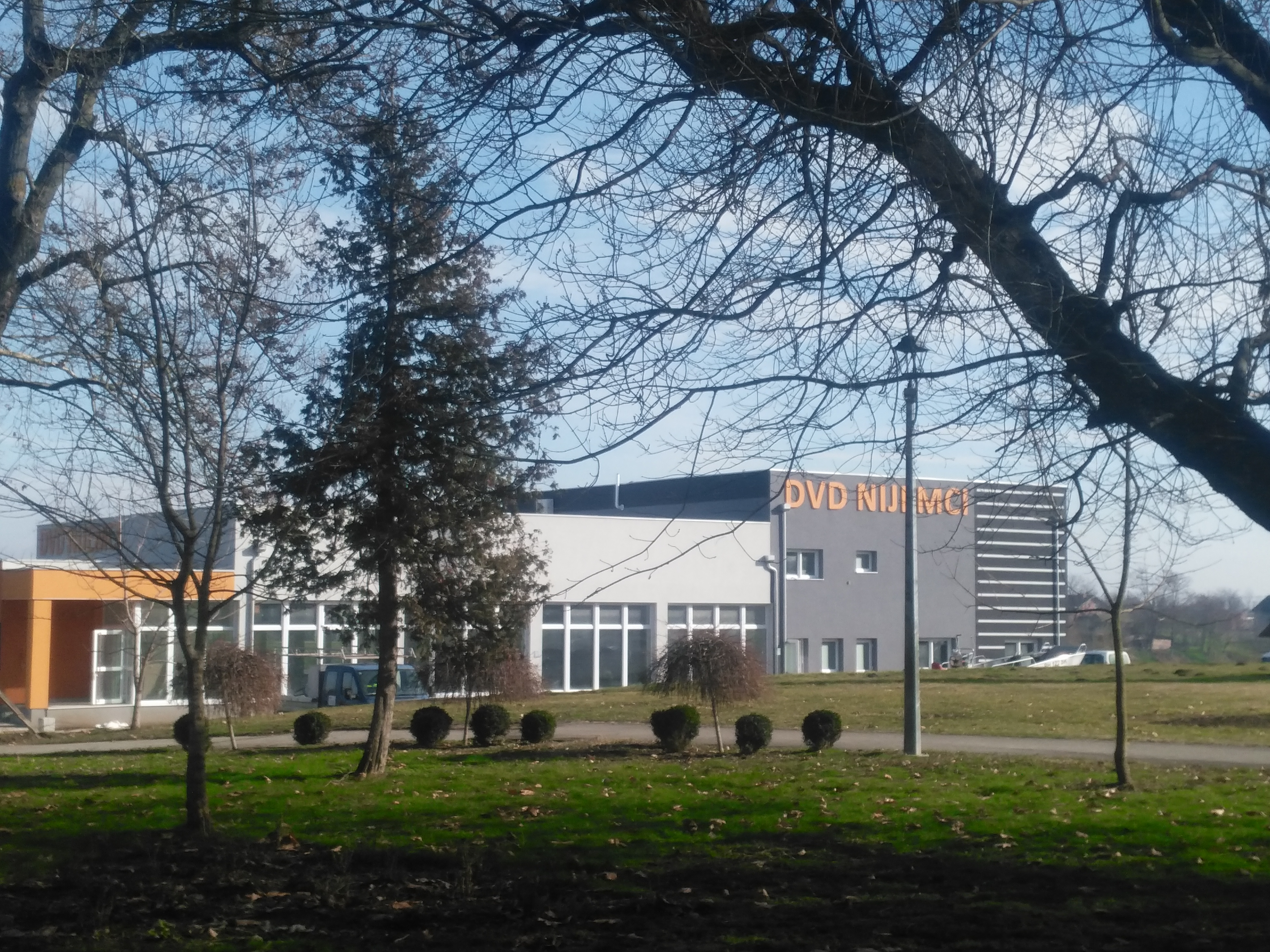
Firefighters building in Nijemci.

Nijemci is underdeveloped municipality which is statistically classified as the First Category Area of Special State Concern by the Government of Croatia.

== Education ==
Local elementary school for the first eight grades operate in the village of Nijemci since the 1760.

== Settlements ==
The following settlements comprise the Nijemci municipality:

| Settlement | Population 2021 | Population 2011 |
|---|---|---|
| Nijemci | 1,345 | 1,605 |
| Lipovac | 575 | 814 |
| Đeletovci | 417 | 511 |
| Donje Novo Selo | 382 | 498 |
| Podgrađe | 275 | 371 |
| Banovci | 261 | 432 |
| Apševci | 208 | 305 |
| Vinkovački Banovci | 117 | 169 |
| Total | 3,580 | 4,705 |

== Notable natives and residents ==
- Mile Dedaković, retired Croatian Army colonel
- Nikica Valentić, Prime Minister of Croatia from 1993 to 1995
- Slobodan Bajić Paja, born in Banovci, People's Hero of Yugoslavia
- Günter Stock, born in Banovci, president of the Berlin-Brandenburg Academy of Sciences and Humanities 2006-2015, Union of the German Academies of Sciences and Humanities 2008-2015, and the All European Academies 2012-2018)
