= Biđ =

Physical characteristics
- Mouth: Bosut
  - coordinates: 45°11′37″N 18°41′21″E

Biđ is a river in Slavonia, Croatia.

Biđ rises near the village of Donja Vrba east of Slavonski Brod and flows eastwards for 62 kilometres (39 mi) to become the most important feeder to Bosut, merging with the Berava at Cerna. The maximum measured flow of Biđ at the mouth is 61.9 m3/s.

Whether Biđ is a headwater or rather a name of the upper flow of Bosut has been a matter of some dispute.

== Sources ==
- Orban-Kljajić, Mica; Kljajić, Josip (November 2003). "Statistic description of Brod Regimente in third decade of 19th century". Scrinia Slavonica (in Croatian). 3 (1).
