= Donje Novo Selo, Croatia =

Donje Novo Selo
- Village (Selo)
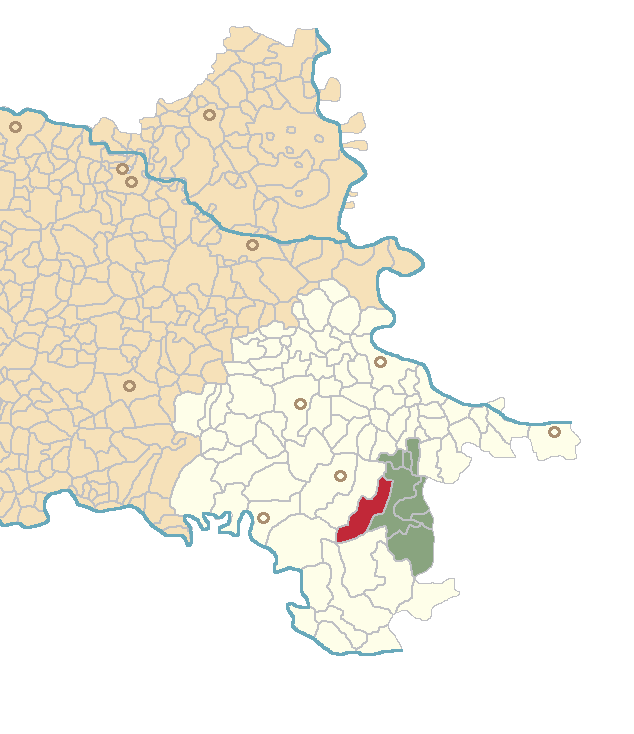

- Location within Vukovar-Syrmia County Location within Croatia Location within Europe
- Coordinates: 45°08′06″N 19°0′0″E
- Country: Croatia
- Region: Syrmia (Spačva basin)
- County: Vukovar-Syrmia
- Municipality: Nijemci

Area
  - Total: 49.9 km^{2} (19.3 sq mi)

Population (2021)
  - Total: 376
  - Density: 7.54/km^{2} (19.5/sq mi)
- Vehicle registration: VK

Donje Novo Selo (Hungarian: Petyke) is a village in the municipality of Nijemci in Vukovar-Syrmia County, Croatia. The population is 498 (census 2011). The etymology of the village comes from Slavic languages meaning new village, Novo Selo.
