= Church of Saint Mary, Morović =

Church of Saint Mary
- Crkva svete Marije
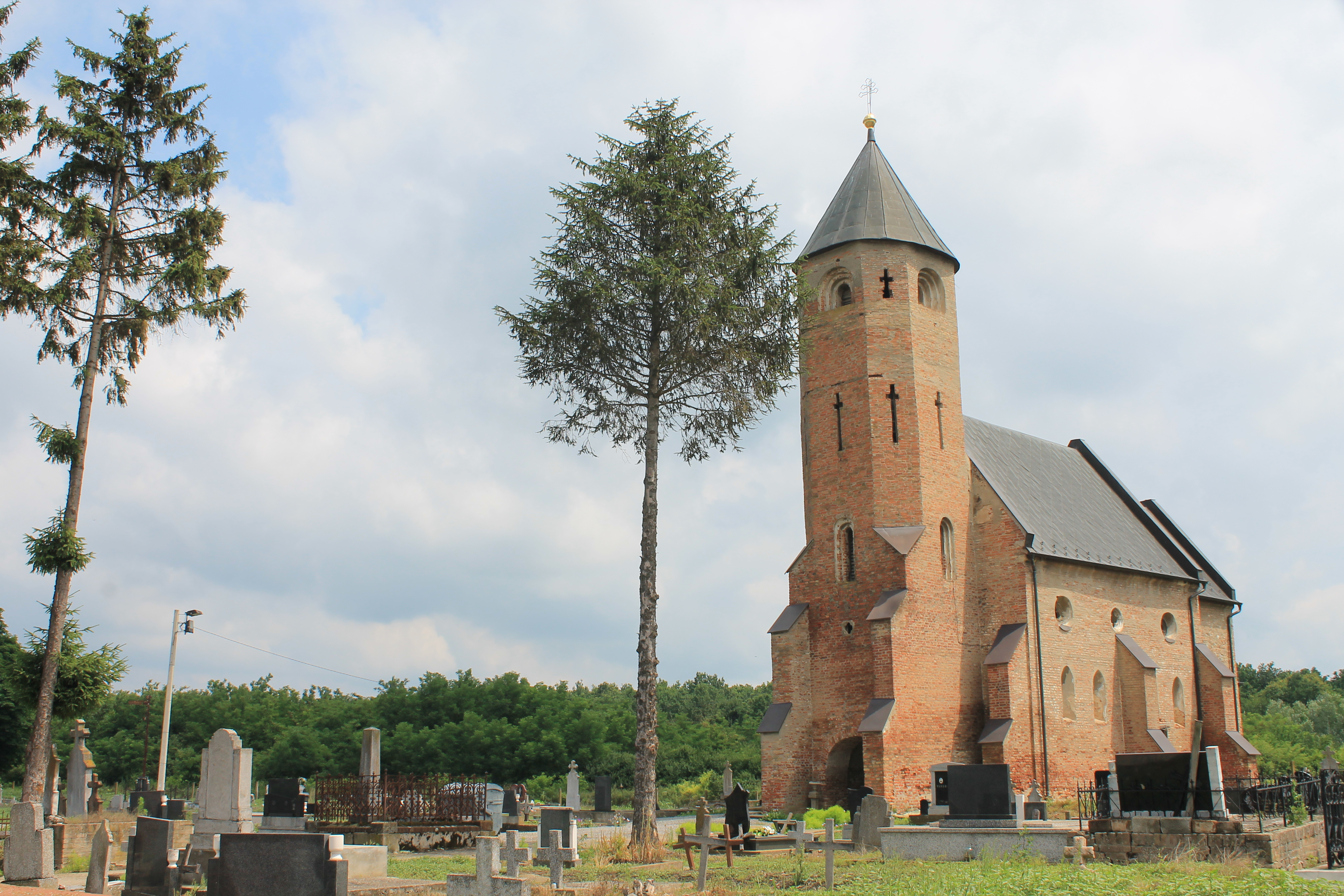
- Church of Saint Mary
- 45°01′02″N 19°13′40″E
- Location: Morović
- Country: Serbia
- Denomination: Roman Catholic

History
- Dedication: Saint Mary

Cultural Heritage of Serbia
- Type: Cultural Monument of Great Importance
- Designated: 30 December 1997
- Reference no.: СК 1356

The Church of Saint Mary (Serbo-Croatian: Crkva svete Marije) in Morović is a Roman Catholic church in Vojvodina, Serbia. The church was built in 12th to 13th century, later extended, and restored at the end of the 19th century. The Gothic nave with a bell tower was added to the original Romanesque church in the 14th century. During the Middle Ages the church was a seat of the Roman Catholic Archdiocese of Morović that was first mentioned in 1239. It was created as an answer to the spread of the Bogomilism of the Bosnian Church. The Archdiocese reached its peak around 1330 when it had about forty local parishes under its jurisdiction. On 1 May 1414 the Antipope John XXIII decorated the rector of the church in Morović and his successors with the title of praepositus and gave him wide jurisdiction over rectors of other churches in the region and exempted him from the authority of the Bishop of Pécs. The Ottoman Empire conquered Morović in 1529 and controlled it up until 1687. The church was burned down by the Ottoman forces in 1664, remained uncovered for 40 years, and was restored only in 1704. Autonomous Province of Vojvodina protected the building as a historical monument on 5 February 1954. Conservation works were carried out in the period of the Socialist Republic of Serbia between 1968 and 1972.

== See also ==
- Catholic Church in Serbia
- Croats of Serbia
- Morović Fortress
