= Podgrađe, Vukovar-Syrmia County =

Podgrađe
- Village (Selo)
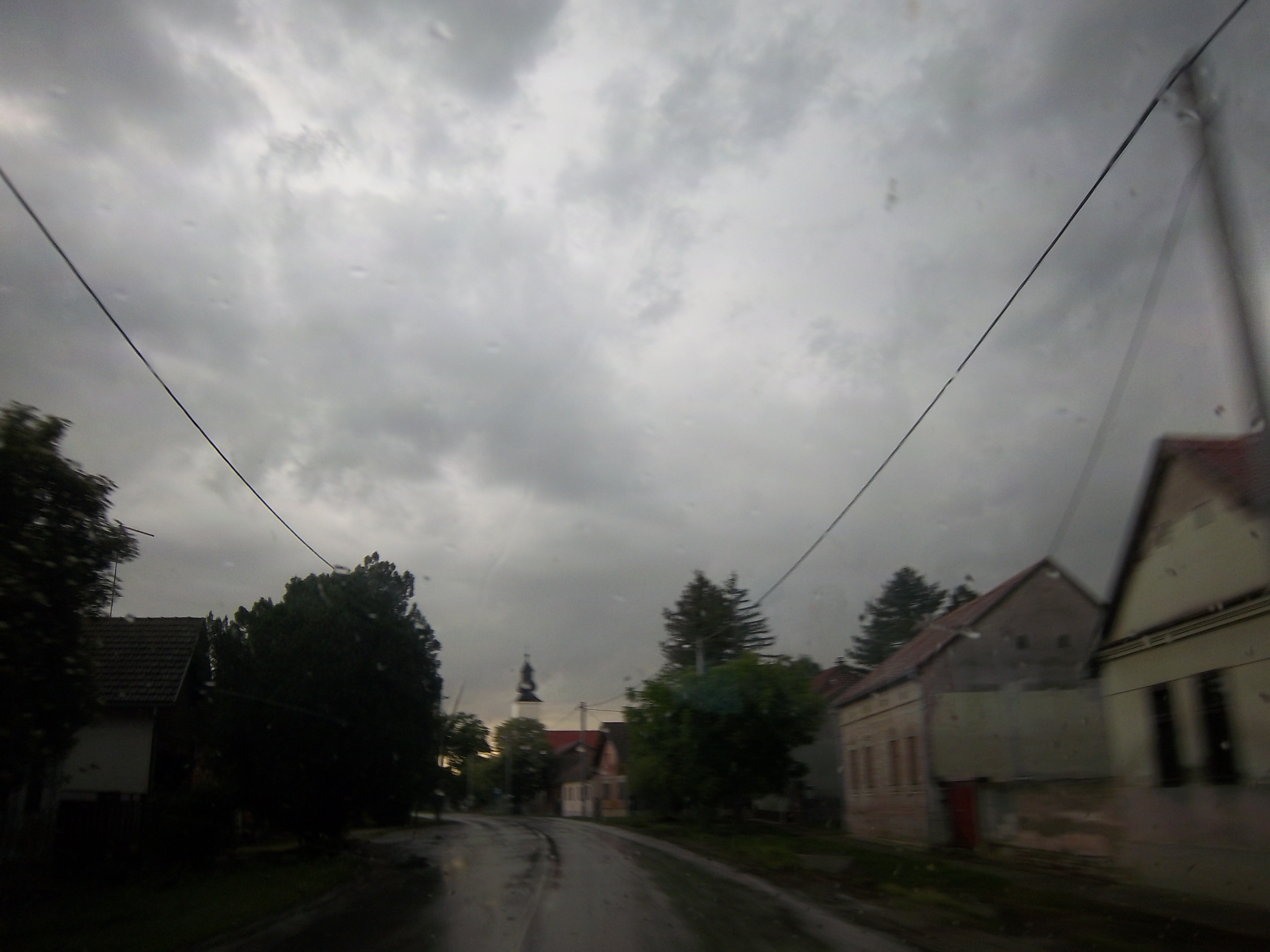

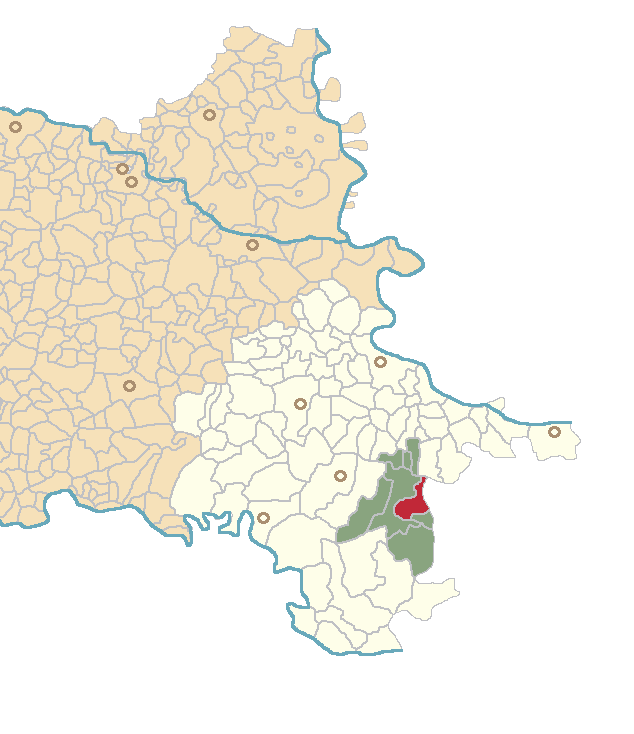

- Location within Vukovar-Syrmia County Location within Croatia Location within Europe
- Coordinates: 45.11°N 19.03°E
- Country: Croatia
- Region: Syrmia (Spačva basin)
- County: Vukovar-Syrmia
- Municipality: Nijemci

Area
  - Total: 27.0 km^{2} (10.4 sq mi)

Population (2021)
  - Total: 269
  - Density: 9.96/km^{2} (25.8/sq mi)
- Time zone: UTC+1 (CET)
  - Summer (DST): UTC+2 (CEST)
- Postal code: 32245 Nijemci
- Vehicle registration: VK

Podgrađe (Hungarian: Váralja) is a village in Syrmia in easternmost part of Croatia along the state border with Serbia. It is administratively part of the Nijemci Municipality, the largest municipality by territory in the county. The population of the village at the time of 2011 census was 371.
