= Bosut, Sremska Mitrovica =

Bosut Босут (Serbian)
- Village (Selo)
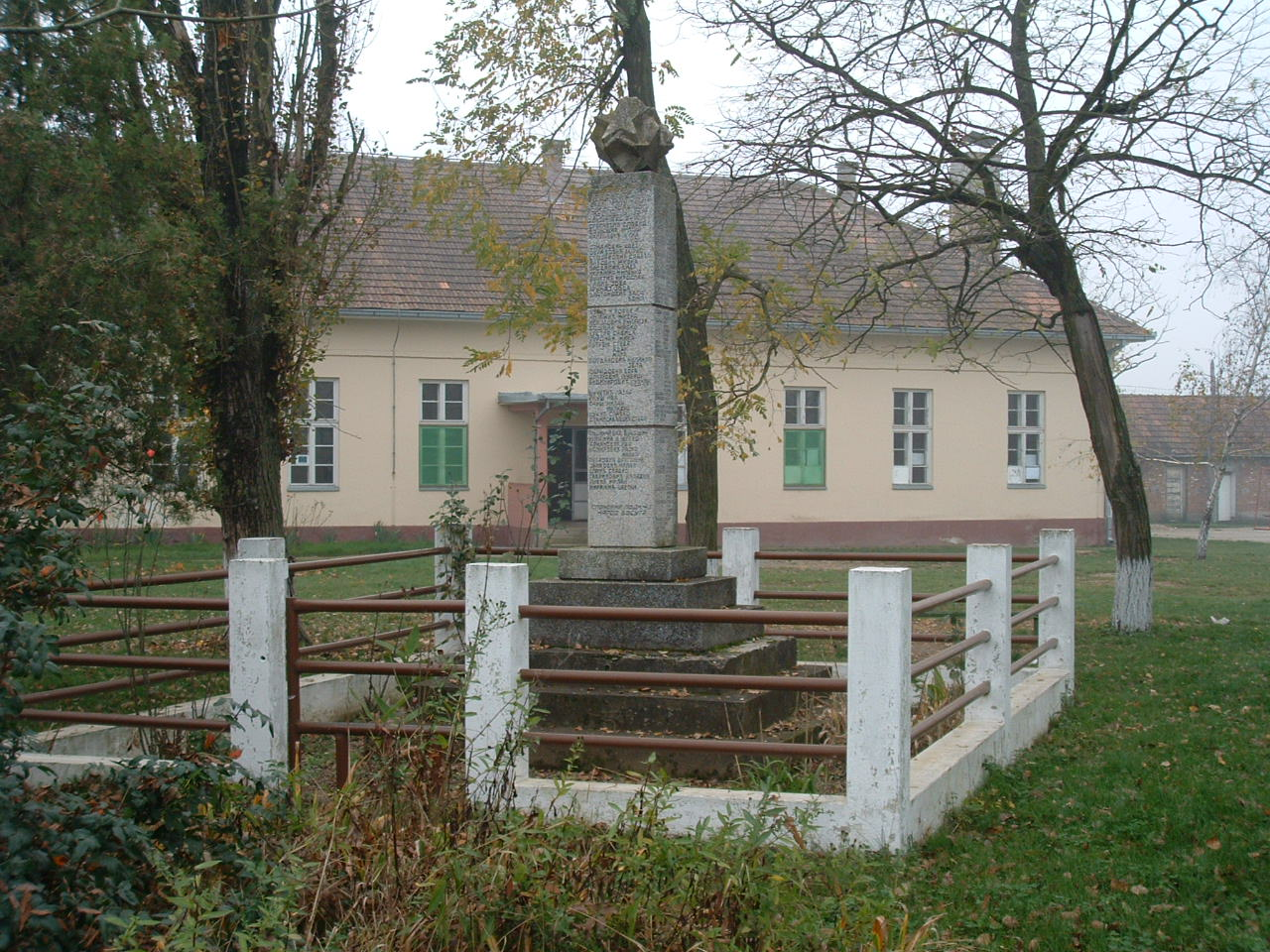

- Location within Vojvodina Location within Serbia Location within Europe
- Coordinates: 44°56′N 19°22′E
- Country: Serbia
- Province: Vojvodina
- Region: Syrmia
- District: Srem
- Municipality: Sremska Mitrovica

Area
  - Total: 28.39 km^{2} (10.96 sq mi)
- Elevation: 78 m (256 ft)

Population (2011)
  - Total: 971
  - Density: 34.2/km^{2} (88.6/sq mi)
- Time zone: UTC+1 (CET)
  - Summer (DST): UTC+2 (CEST)

Bosut (Serbian Cyrillic: Босут) is a village located in the city of Sremska Mitrovica, Serbia. It is situated near the Bosut River, in the autonomous province of Vojvodina. As of 2011 census, it has a population of 971 inhabitants.

While returning early from Budapest-Rakos M/Y mission, town was bombed by 1 x 463rd BG Boeing B-17 on 27 June 1944 as a target of opportunity: 16 x 250 GP bombs dropped on the main highway / powerplant.

== Name ==
In Serbian, the village is known as Bosut (Босут), in Croatian as Bosut, and in Hungarian as Boszut. There is also a river with the same name (see: Bosut River).

== Historical population ==
- 1961: 1,094
- 1971: 1,284
- 1981: 1,311
- 1991: 1,149
- 2002: 1,139
- 2011: 971

== See also ==
- List of places in Serbia
- List of cities, towns and villages in Vojvodina
