= Lipovac, Vukovar-Syrmia County =

Lipovac
- Village (Selo)
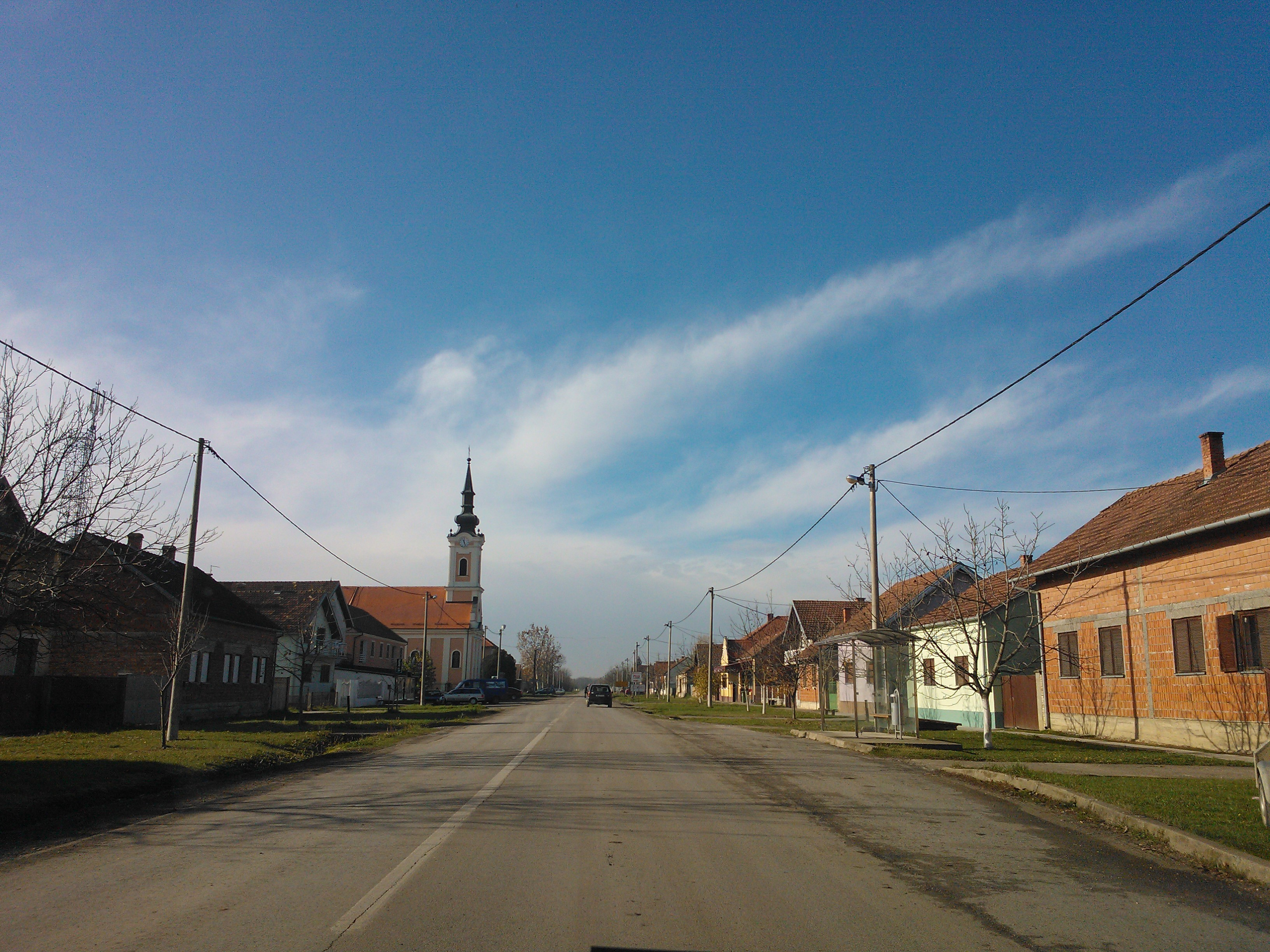
- Lipovac

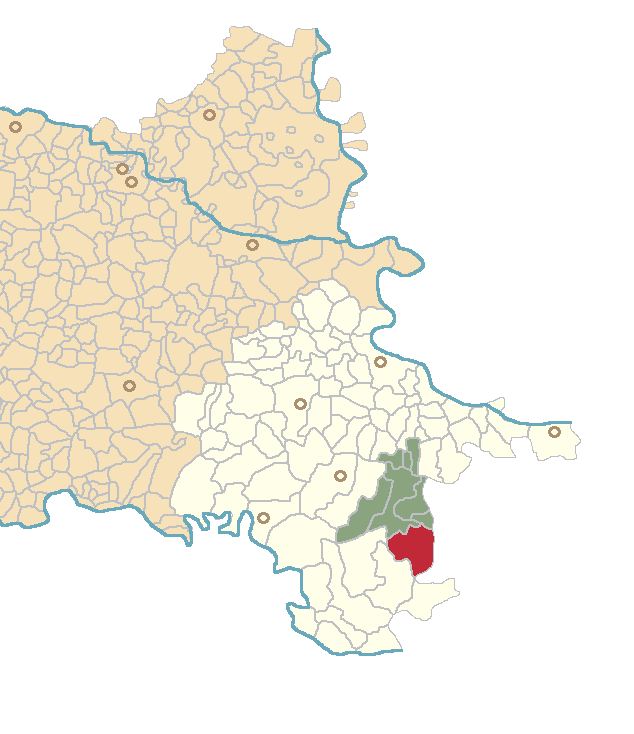

- Location within Vukovar-Syrmia County Location within Croatia Location within Europe
- Coordinates: 45°03′18″N 19°04′16″E
- Country: Croatia
- Region: Syrmia (Spačva basin)
- County: Vukovar-Syrmia
- Municipality: Nijemci

Area
  - Total: 57.9 km^{2} (22.4 sq mi)

Population (2021)
  - Total: 556
  - Density: 9.60/km^{2} (24.9/sq mi)
- Time zone: UTC+1 (CET)
  - Summer (DST): UTC+2 (CEST)
- Vehicle registration: VK
- Website: www.opcina-nijemci/lipovac

Lipovac (Hungarian: Felsőlipóc, German: Lipowatz, Serbian Cyrillic: Липовац) is a village in Syrmia in easternmost part of Croatia along the state border with Serbia and the village of Batrovci on the other side of the border. It is administratively part of the Nijemci Municipality, the largest municipality by territory in the county. The population of the village at the time of 2011 census was 814.

The village is located near the end point of the highway A3, to the south of the Bosut river. During the Croatian war of Independence, it was occupied and incorporated into the SAO Eastern Slavonia, Baranja and Western Syrmia. The region was peacefully reintegrated via UNTAES transitional administration after which many local residents returned to their homes. In recent years, and particularly since the 2013 enlargement of the European Union the village and the rest of the region is experiencing significant level of depopulation, population ageing and brain drain which represents socioeconomic and long term sustainability challenge.
