= St Katarina Church, Nijemci =

Coordinates: 45°8′24″N 19°2′13″E

St Katarina Church
- Crkva svete Katarine
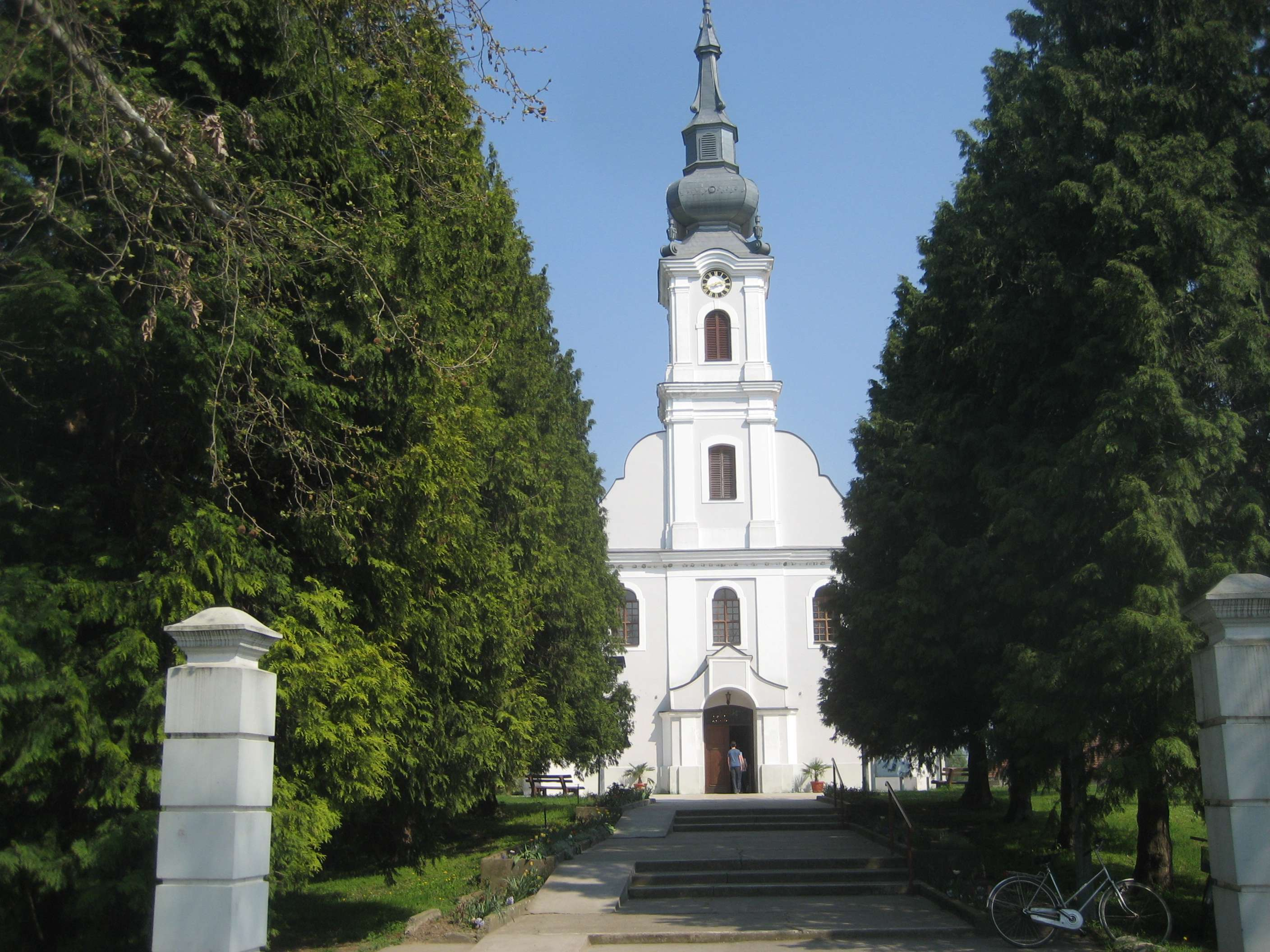
- St Katarina Church
- St Katarina Church
- Location: Nijemci, Croatia
- Country: Croatia
- Denomination: Roman Catholic

History
- Dedication: Catherine of Alexandria

Architecture
- Style: Baroque
- Years built: 1729

Administration
- Archdiocese: Roman Catholic Archdiocese of Đakovo-Osijek

St Katarina Church is a Roman Catholic church in Nijemci, Croatia. The Catholic parish in Nijemci was mentioned for the first time in the 13th century. In 1332 it was a seat of one of the largest parishes in the Western Sirmium. The St Katarina Church was built in 1729 and has been refurbished several times since then.
