= Šiškovci =

Coordinates: 45°12′N 18°39′E

- Village
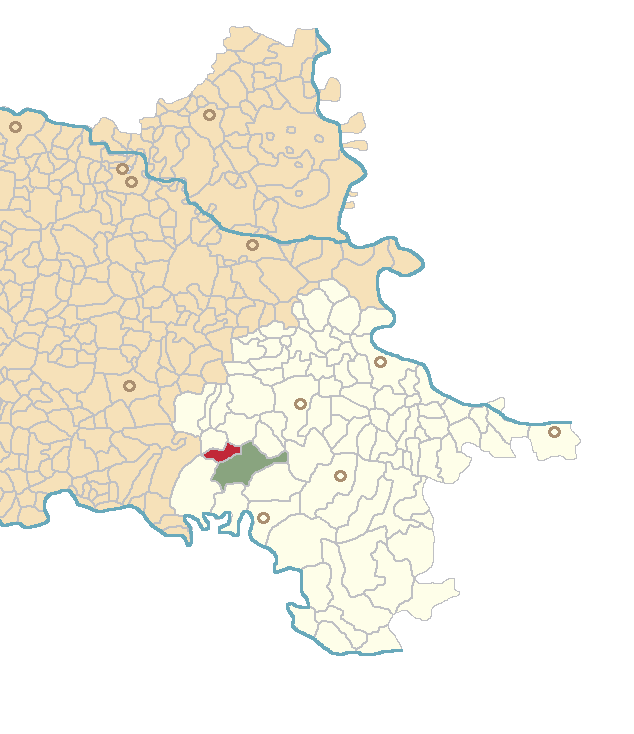
- Country: Croatia
- County: Vukovar-Syrmia
- Municipality: Cerna

Area
  - Total: 14.9 km^{2} (5.8 sq mi)

Population (2021)
  - Total: 693
  - Density: 46.5/km^{2} (120/sq mi)
- Time zone: UTC+1 (CET)
  - Summer (DST): UTC+2 (CEST)

Šiškovci is a village in Croatia.
