= Spačva (river) =

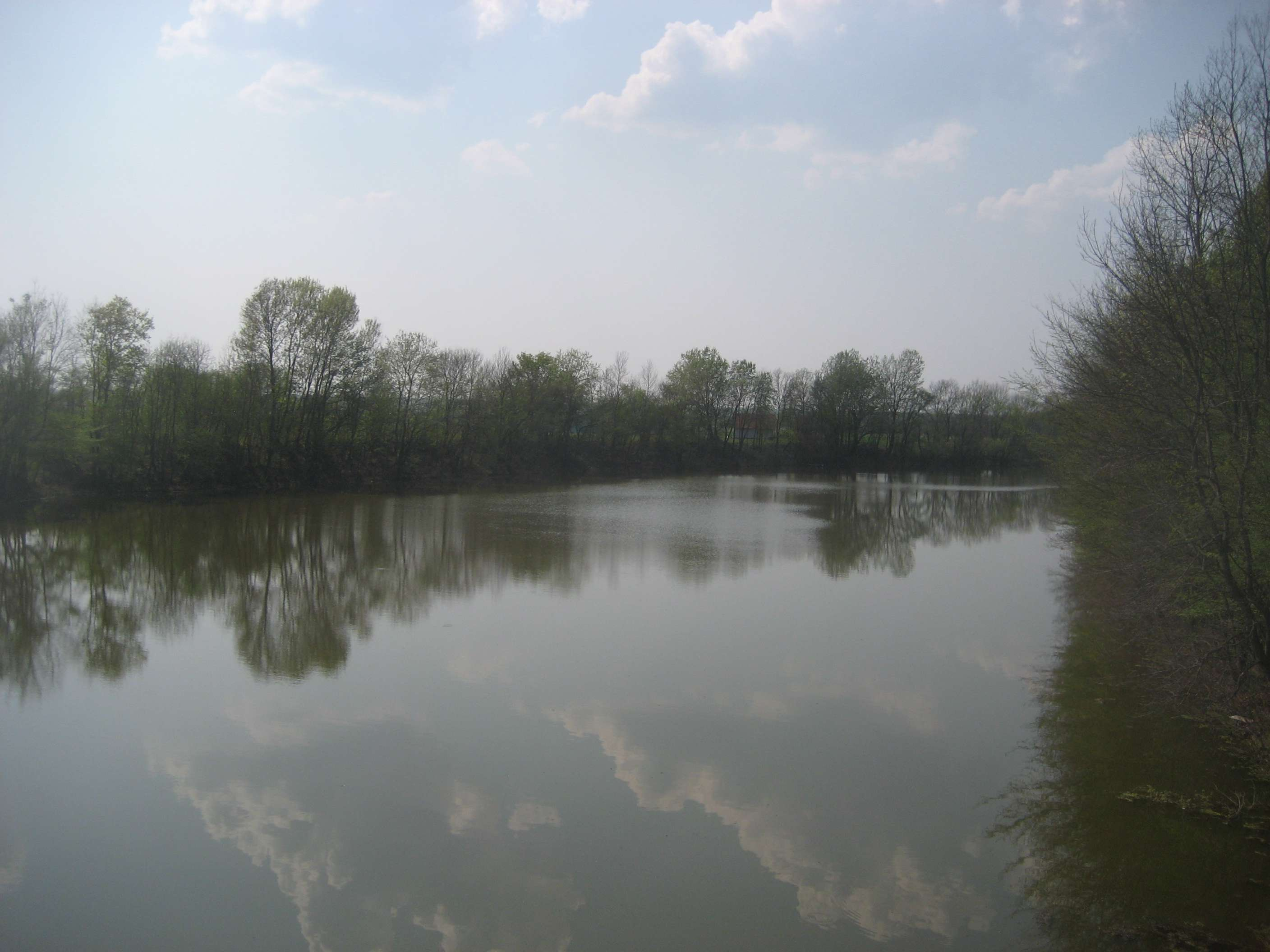

Location
- Country: Croatia

Physical characteristics
- Mouth
  - location: Bosut
  - coordinates: 45.0645°N 19.0765°E
- Length: 40.2 km (25.0 mi)

Basin features
- Progression: Bosut→ Sava→ Danube→ Black Sea

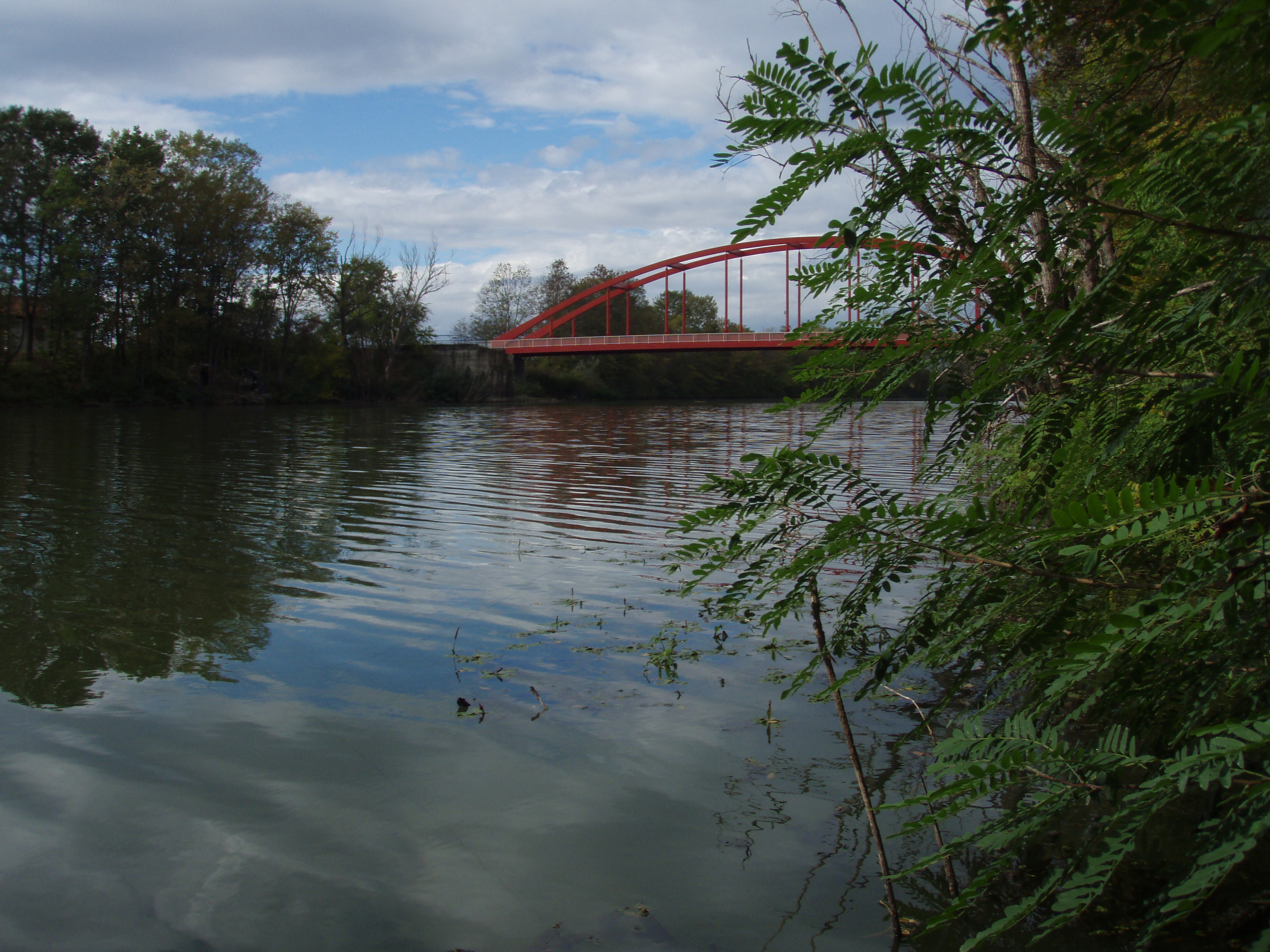
View of Spačva

Spačva is a small river in eastern Croatia. It rises in the swampy Spačva region, takes in river Breznica, and flows into the Bosut between Lipovac and Apševci. It is also linked with Studva, and its entire course is 40.2 km (25.0 mi) long.

== See also ==
- Spačva (region)
