= Apševci =

Coordinates: 45°04′N 19°04′E

- Village (Selo)
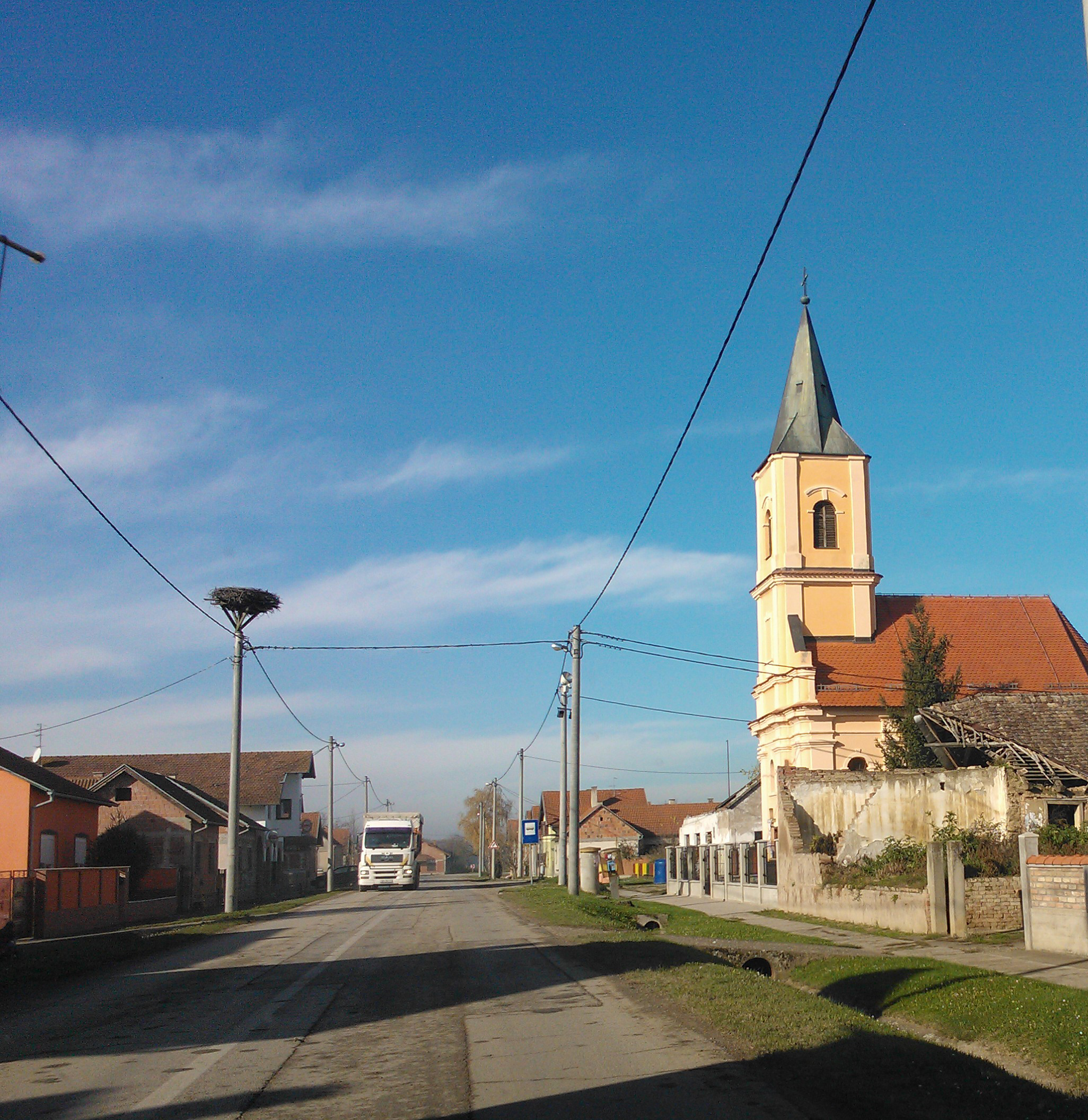

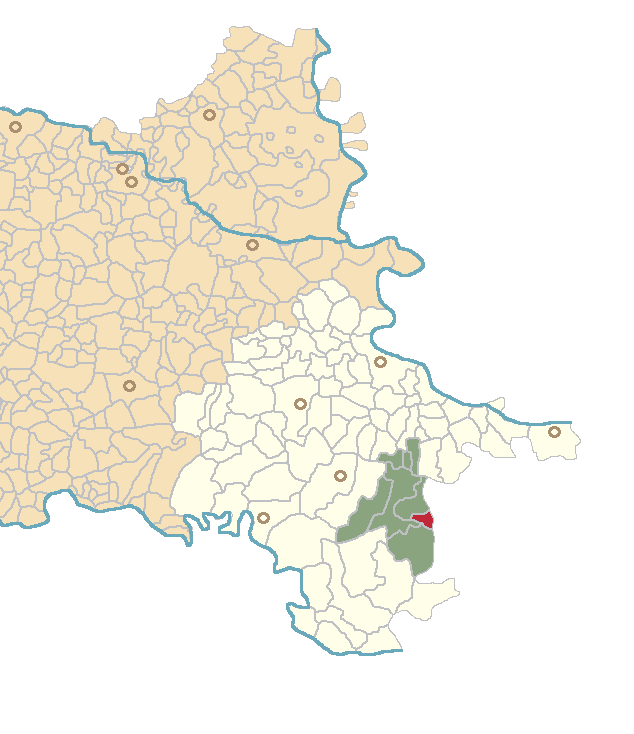
- Country: Croatia
- Region: Syrmia (Spačva basin)
- County: Vukovar-Syrmia
- Municipality: Nijemci

Area
  - Total: 10.0 km^{2} (3.9 sq mi)

Population (2021)
  - Total: 203
  - Density: 20.3/km^{2} (52.6/sq mi)
- Time zone: UTC+1 (CET)
  - Summer (DST): UTC+2 (CEST)
- Vehicle registration: VK

Apševci (Hungarian: Halápfalva) is a village in Syrmia in easternmost part of Croatia along the state border with Serbia. It is administratively part of the Nijemci Municipality, the largest municipality by territory in the county. The population of the village at the time of 2011 census was 305.

== Name ==
The name of the village in Croatian is plural.
