= Andrijaševci =

- Municipality
- Andrijaševci Municipality; Općina Andrijaševci
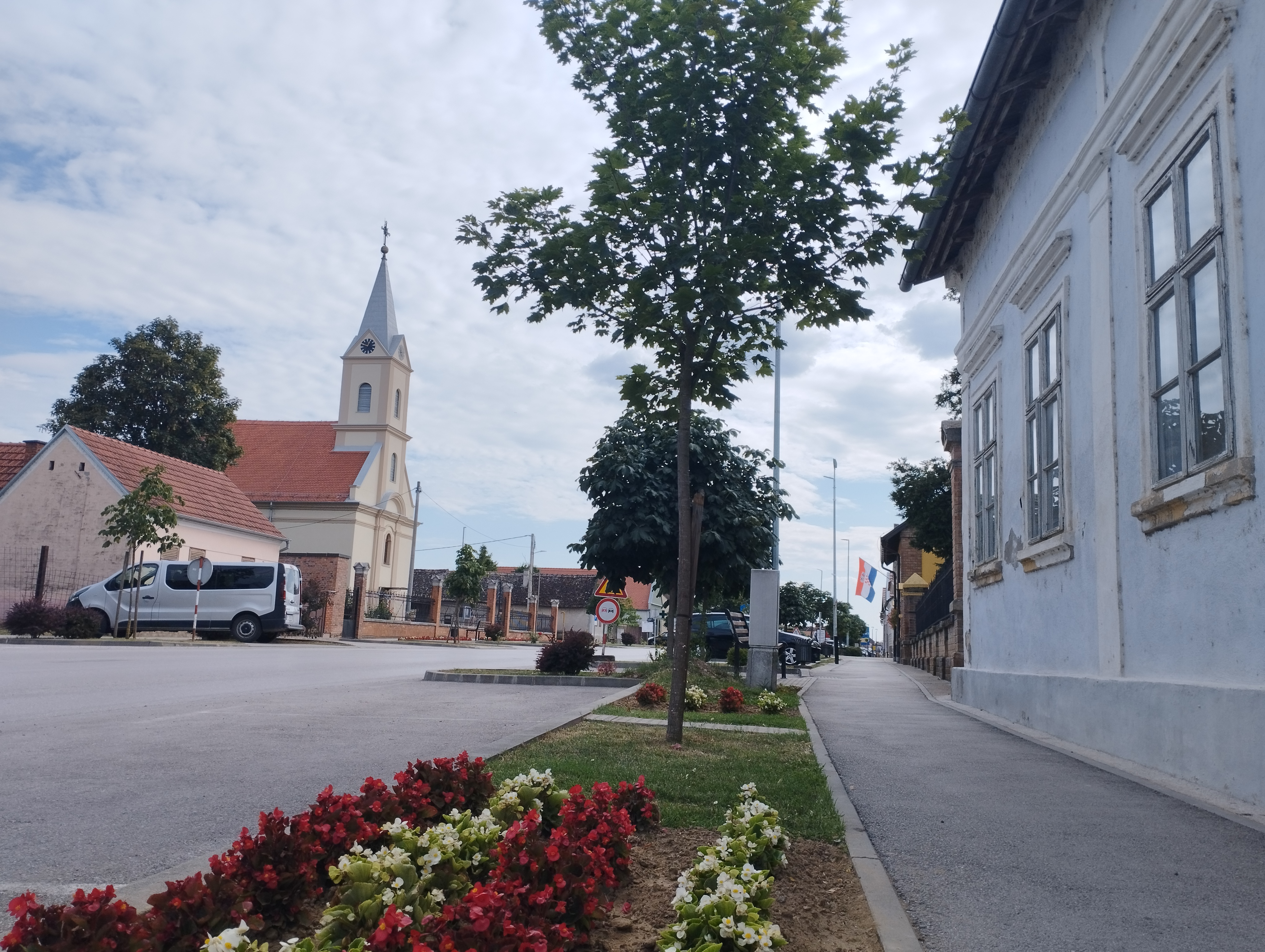
- Andrijaševci

- Flag Coat of arms
- Interactive map of Andrijaševci
- Location within Croatia
- Coordinates: 45°13′N 18°44′E
- Country: Croatia
- Region: Slavonia
- County: Vukovar-Syrmia County

Government
  - Municipal mayor: Jozo Škegro

Area
  - Municipality: 39.6 km^{2} (15.3 sq mi)
  - Urban: 24.6 km^{2} (9.5 sq mi)

Population (2021)
  - Municipality: 3,441
  - Density: 86.9/km^{2} (225/sq mi)
  - Urban: 1,749
  - Urban density: 71.1/km^{2} (184/sq mi)
- Time zone: UTC+1 (CET)
  - Summer (DST): UTC+2 (CEST)
- Postal code: 32100 Vinkovci
- Area code: 32
- Vehicle registration: VK
- Website: andrijasevci.hr

Andrijaševci (Note: Hungarian: Andrásfalva, German: Sankt Andreas) is a village and a municipality in Vukovar-Srijem County in eastern Croatia. Despite its name, the seat of the municipality is in the village of Rokovci.

== Name ==
The name of the village in Croatian is plural.

== History ==
In July 1943, during the World War II in Yugoslavia, Nazi forces destroyed agricultural machinery, including threshers, across several villages, including Andrijaševci.

== Demographics ==
With pronounced issue of population decline in eastern Croatia caused by population ageing, effects of the Croatian War of Independence and post 2013 enlargement of the European Union emigration, the population of the municipality at the time of 2021 census dropped to 3,441 from 2011 census that listed a total of 4,075 inhabitants.

In 2021, the municipality had 3,441 residents in the following settlements:

- Andrijaševci, population 1,749
- Rokovci, population 1,692
Andrijaševci: Population trends 1857–2021
v

population	1205	1133	1328	1651	1978	1940	2069	2277	2722	3112	3594	3734	3923	4031	4249	4075	3441
	1857	1869	1880	1890	1900	1910	1921	1931	1948	1953	1961	1971	1981	1991	2001	2011	2021

Sources: Croatian Bureau of Statistics publications

=== Austro-Hungarian 1910 census ===
Municipality of Andrijaševci
Population by language	Population by religion
total: 1,940: 1. Croatian or Serbian 1,305 (67.3%); 2. German 385 (19.8%); 3. Hungarian 228 (11.8%); 4. Slovak 18 (0.92%); 5. Czech 2 (0.10%); 6. Slovene 1 (0.05%); 7. others 1 (0.05%)	total: 1,940: 1. Roman Catholics 1,881 (97.0%); 2. Lutherans 26 (1.34%); 3. Eastern Orthodox 20 (1.03%); 4. Calvinists 6 (0.30%); 5. Jewish 6 (0.30%); 6. Eastern Catholics 1 (0.05%)
