= Studva =

Studva (Студва)
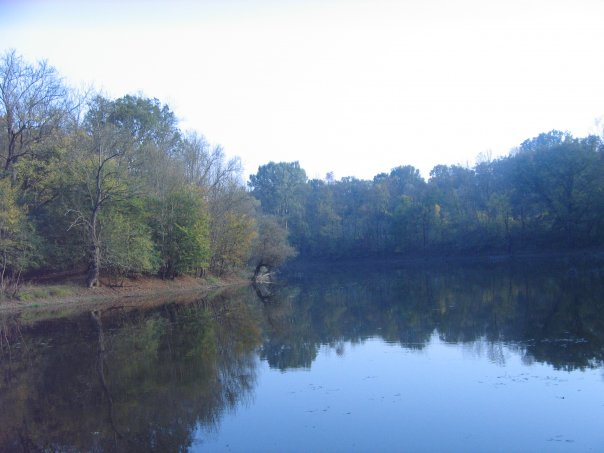
- River Studva along Soljanka forest

Location
- Countries: Croatia; Serbia

Physical characteristics
- Source
  - location: western Syrmia region, Croatia
- Mouth
  - location: Bosut river, at Morović, Vojvodina, Serbia
  - coordinates: 45°00′22″N 19°13′01″E
- Length: 37 km (23 mi)
- Basin size: 355 km^{2} (137 sq mi)

Basin features
- Progression: Bosut→ Sava→ Danube→ Black Sea

The Studva (Serbo-Croatian: Studva / Студва) is a river in eastern Croatia and northern Serbia, a 37 km-long right tributary to the Bosut river. It flows entirely within the Syrmia region of both Croatia and Serbia (Vojvodina).

The Studva originates from the marshes of the western Syrmia in Croatia (Spačva sub-region), near the village of Gunja. It is a slow, meandering river and spills over into several marshes as it flows by the villages of Đurići, Drenovci, Soljani and Vrbanja.

There is a canal from the Studva to the river Spačva.

At the medieval ruins of the town of Zvezdangrad, the Studva becomes a border river between Croatia and Serbia (total length as a border or Serbian river is 18 km). At the village of Morović the Studva empties into the Bosut river.

Just like the Bosut itself, the Studva is a satellite flow to the Sava river and uses the same, ancient (fossile) Sava's river bed. The river is navigable for 18 km for smaller vessels, drains an area of 355 km^{2} and belongs to the Black Sea drainage basin.
