= Cerna, Croatia =

Cerna
- Municipality
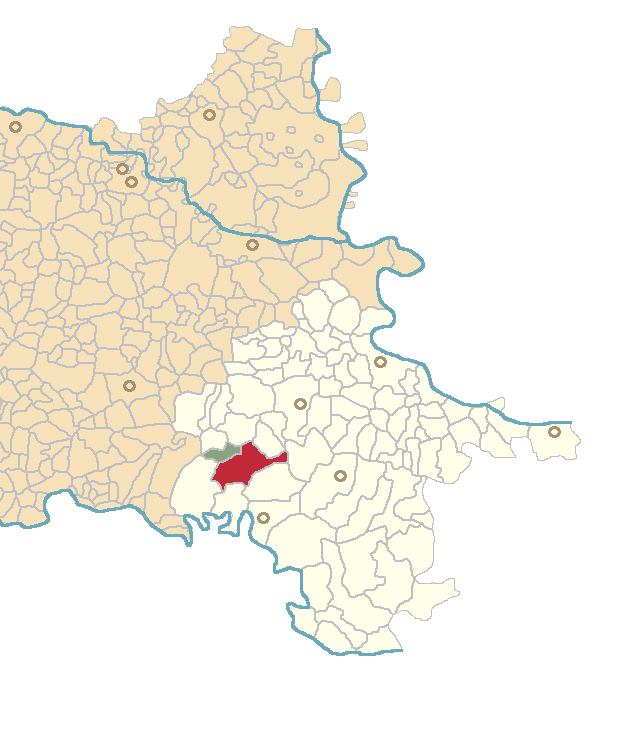

- Location within Vukovar-Syrmia County Location within Croatia Location within Europe
- Coordinates: 45°11′25″N 18°41′20″E
- Country: Croatia
- County: Vukovar-Syrmia County

Government
  - Mayor: Josip Štorek

Area
  - Municipality: 69.5 km^{2} (26.8 sq mi)
  - Urban: 54.7 km^{2} (21.1 sq mi)

Population (2021)
  - Municipality: 3,712
  - Density: 53.4/km^{2} (138/sq mi)
  - Urban: 3,019
  - Urban density: 55.2/km^{2} (143/sq mi)
- Time zone: UTC+1 (CET)
  - Summer (DST): UTC+2 (CEST)
- Vehicle registration: ŽU
- Website: cerna.hr

Cerna (German: Asorn) is a village and a municipality in eastern Croatia.

== Geography ==
It is located half-way between the cities of Vinkovci and Županja. It is located on four rivers, Biđ, Bosut, Berava, Bitulja, Krajc channel and Kaluđer channel.

== Population ==
According to 2021 Croatian census it has 3,722 inhabitants in 2 settlements:

- Cerna - 3,027
- Šiškovci - 695

98.96% of the citizens are Croats.

== History ==
One Scordisci archaeological site in Cerna dating back to late La Tène culture was excavated in the 1970s and 1980s as a part of rescue excavations in eastern Croatia. Archaeological site was a part of the settlement network of Scordisci in the area of Vinkovci.

== See also ==
- Spačva basin
