= Spačva basin =

Region in eastern Croatia

Coordinates: 45°03′08″N 18°56′20″E

Spačva basin Spačvanski bazen (Croatian) Спачвански базен (Serbian)
- geographic region
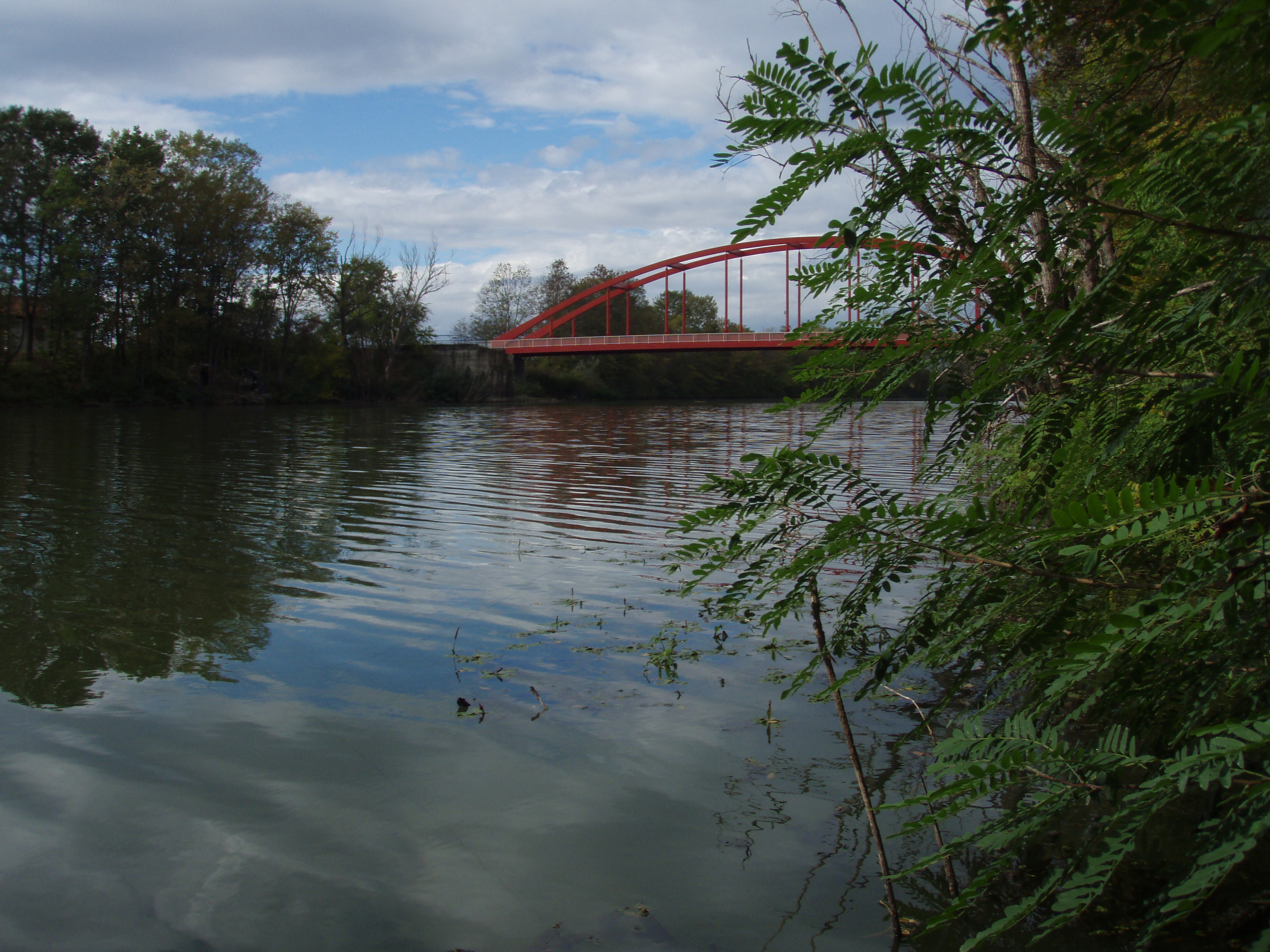

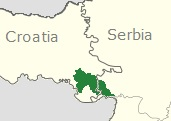
- Spačva (region) together with Bosutska šuma
- Interactive map of Spačva basin
- Country: Croatia, Serbia
- Region: Syrmia
- Administrative region: Vukovar-Syrmia / Syrmia District
- Municipality: Otok, Nijemci, Privlaka, Šid
- Time zone: UTC+1 (CET)
  - Summer (DST): UTC+2 (CEST)

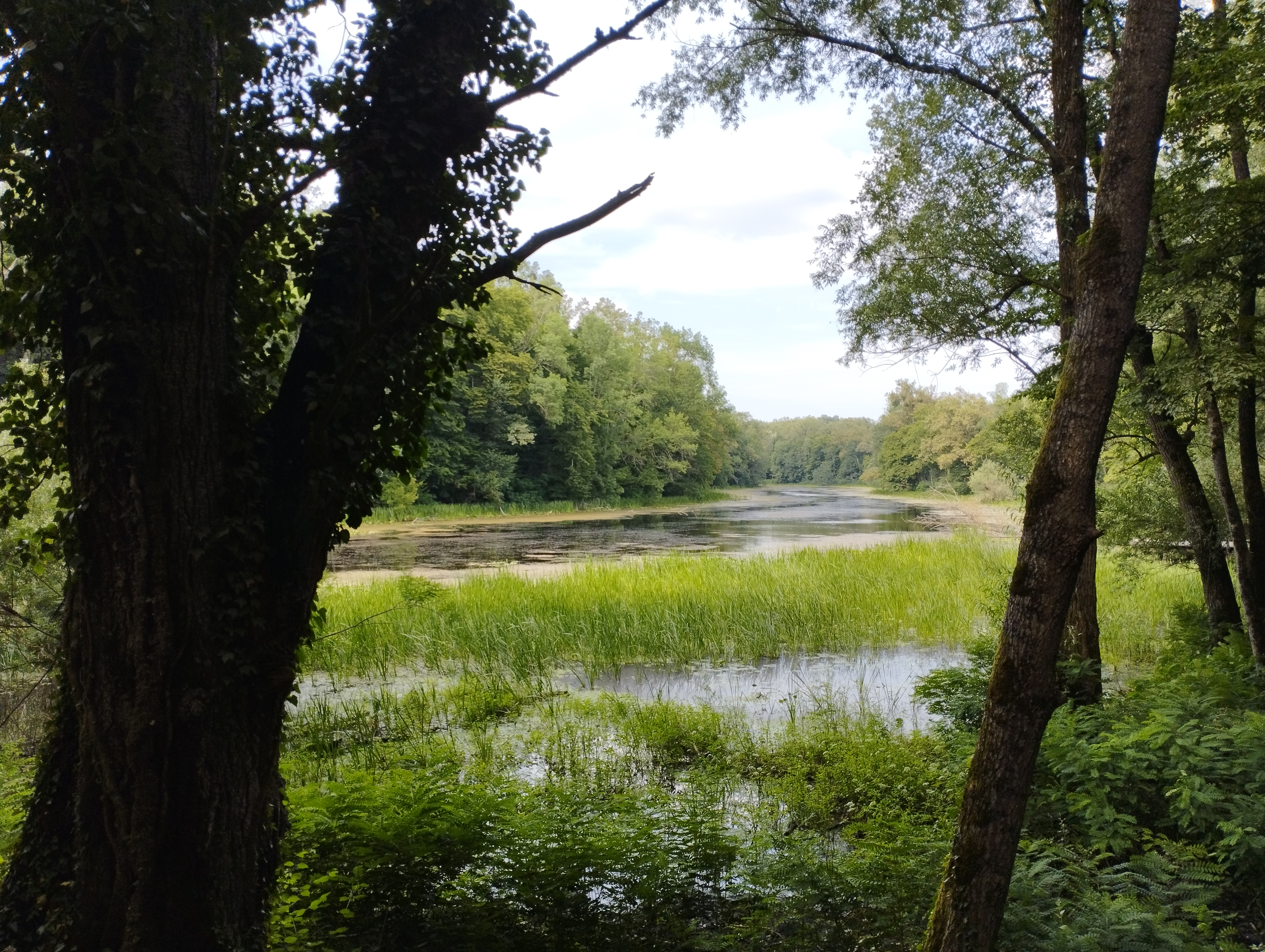
Otočki virovi

The Spačva basin (Serbo-Croatian: Spačvanski bazen, Спачвански базен) is a geographic microregion in eastern Croatia and northwest Serbia. The region is located in the southwestern part of Syrmia—the latter being divided by Croatia and Serbia—and the southeastern part of Slavonia macroregion of Croatia, surrounding the Spačva River and the Studva River. The entire region measures 51,000 hectares, out of which 40,000 hectares is located in Croatia and 11,000 in Serbia.

The region's 40,000 hectares of oak (Quercus robur) forests makes the Spačva basin one of the largest continuous lowland oak forests in Europe. Up until the 1935 regulation of the bank of the Sava River the entire region was regularly flooded in spring.

In addition, the region forms an organic continuum with the Bosut Forest (Bosutska šuma, Serbian Cyrillic: Босутска шума) in Vojvodina in Serbia. The Bosut Forest is one of two strict nature reserves in Vojvodina. The Spačva basin and Bosut Forest form the northern section of forest and swampland complex spreading south of the Sava River as well, where it is known as Donje Podrinje in Bosnia and Herzegovina and Central Serbia.

Wood industry based in Spačva basin is an important natural resource in the economic output of Vukovar-Syrmia County. The industrial exploitation of the forest was initiated in the 19th century at the time of Slavonian Military Frontier. The major settlement in the region is the town of Otok.

== Gallery ==
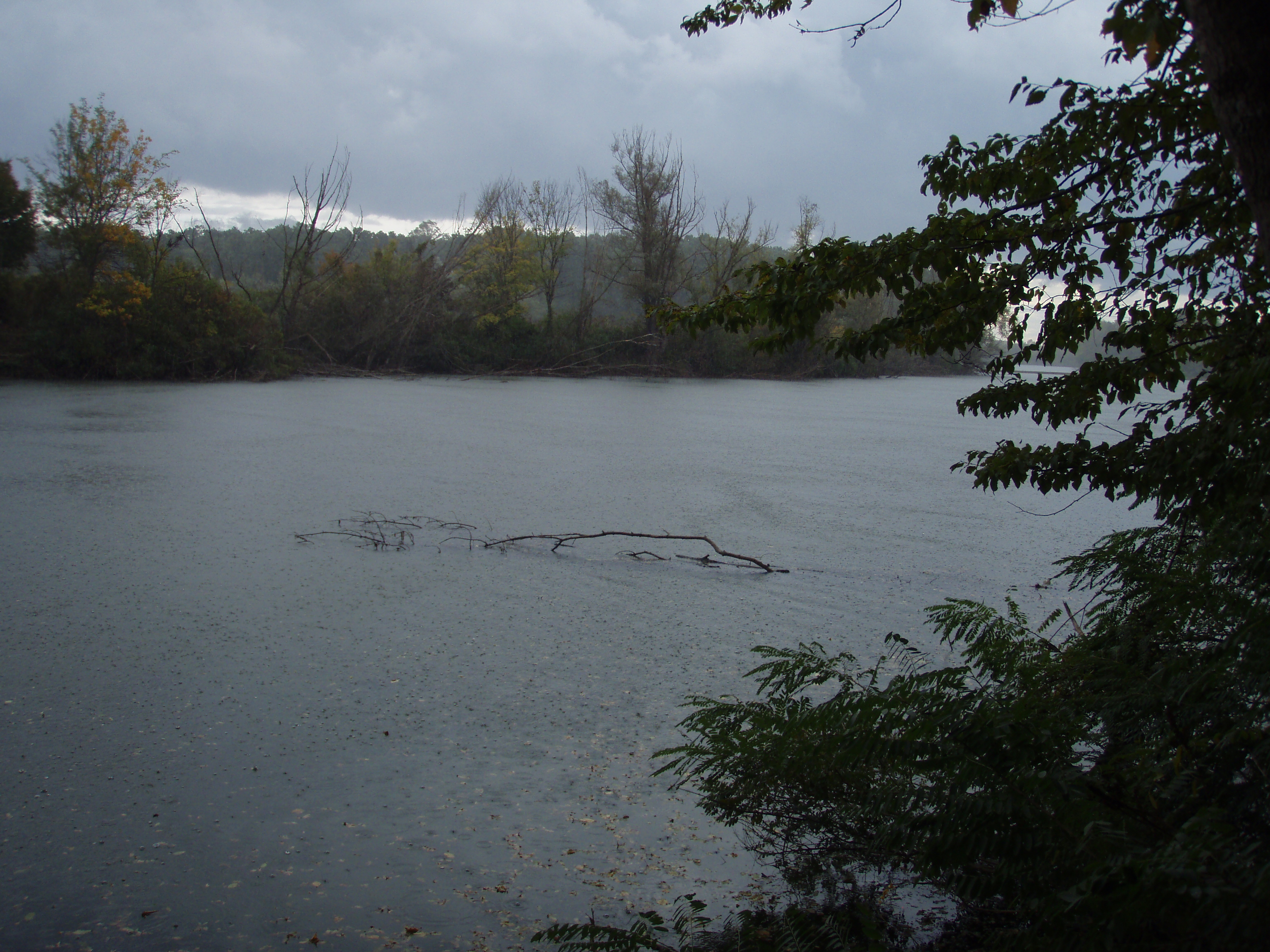
Croatia

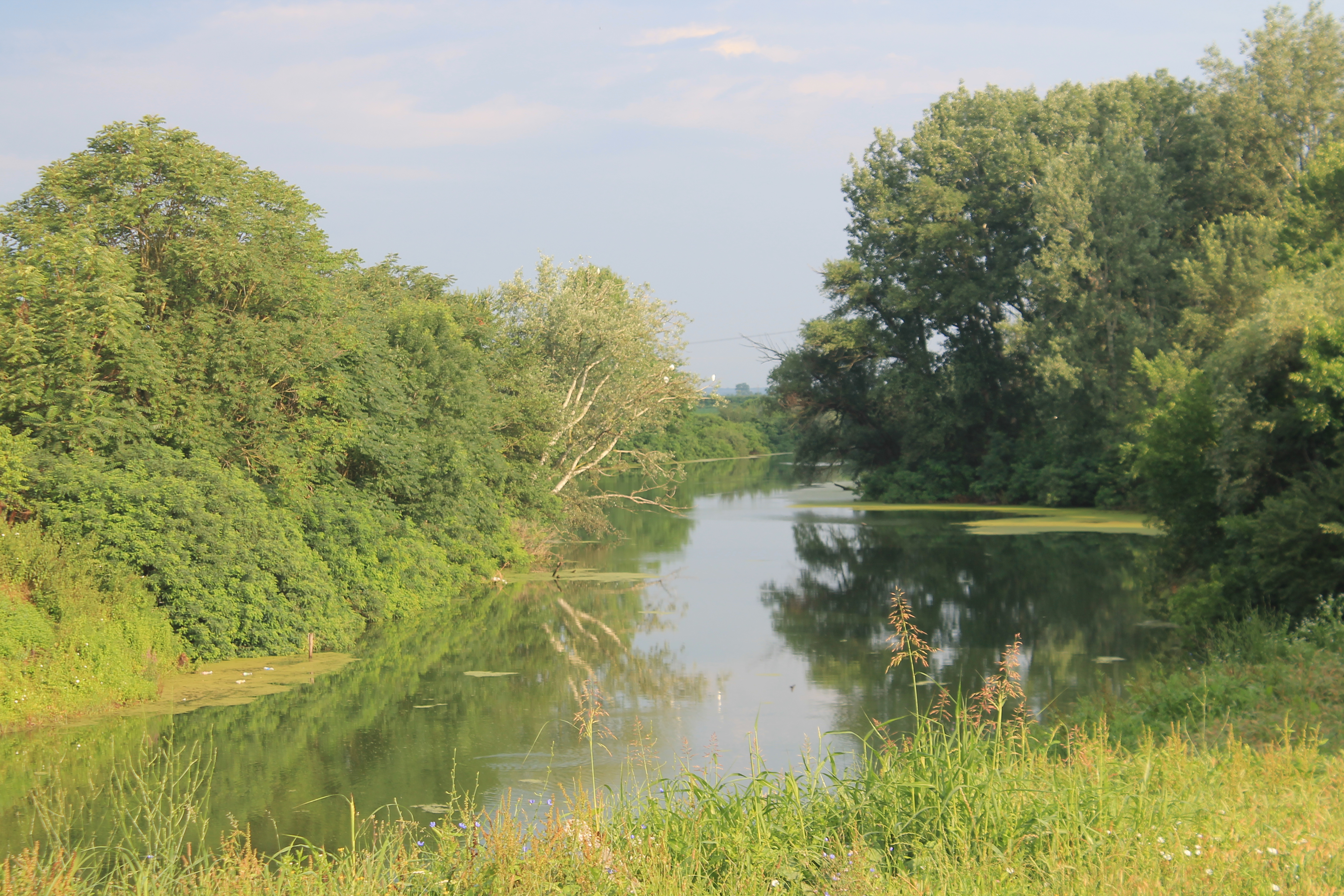
Serbia

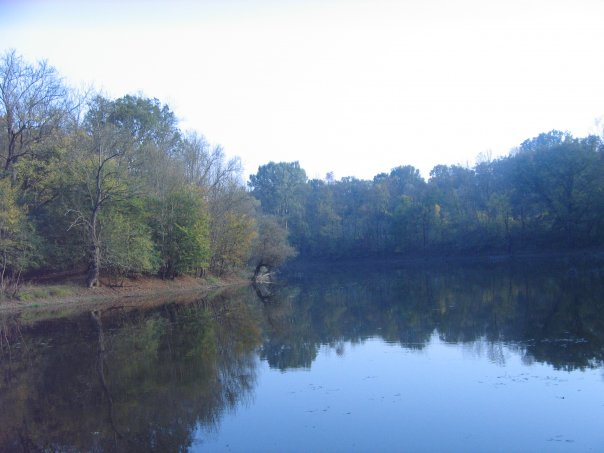
Studva

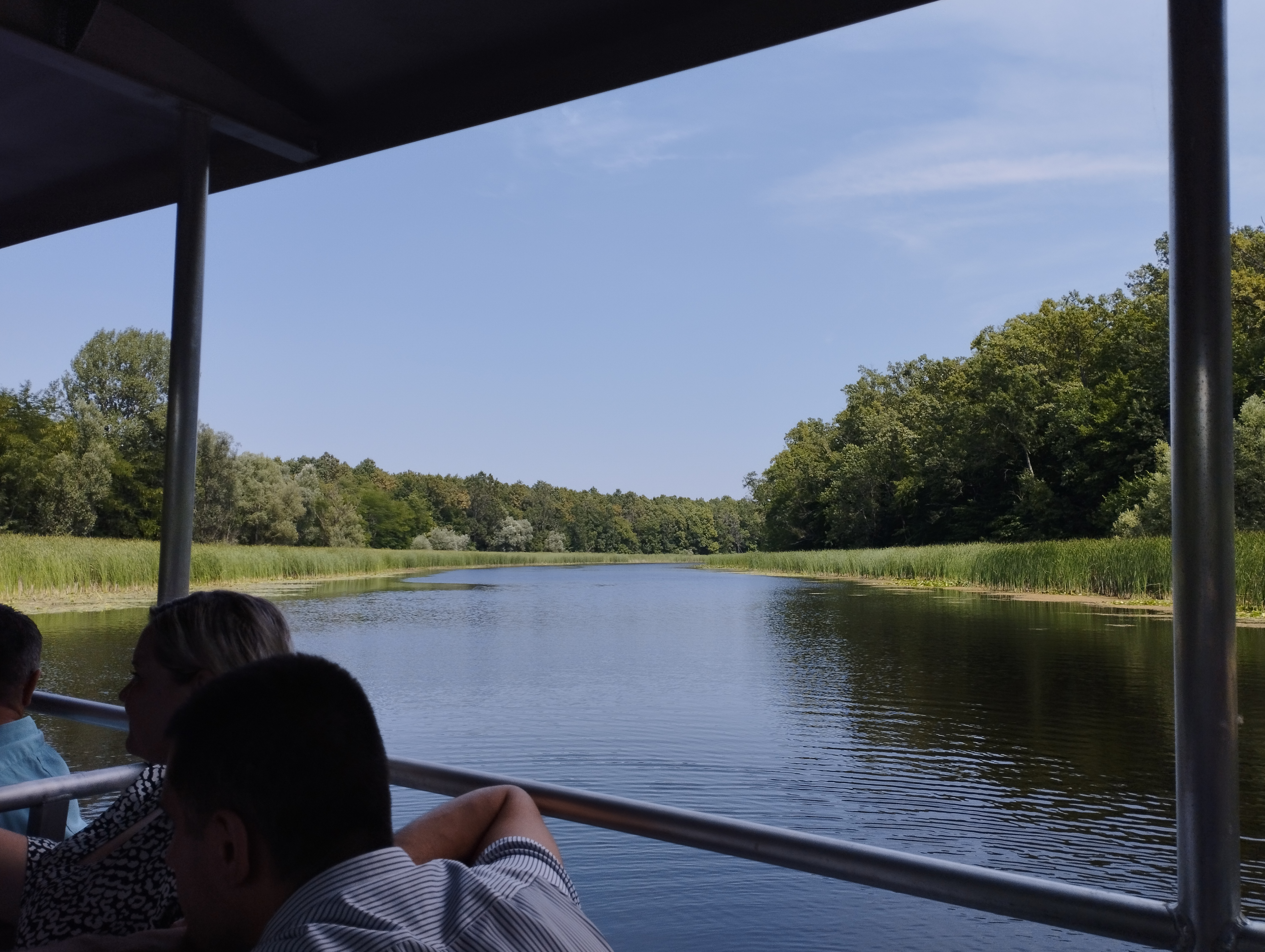
Otočki virovi

== See also ==
- Geography of Croatia
- Kopački Rit
- Historical Palača Swamp of the Bobota Canal
- Lonjsko Polje and Jelas-polje
- Gornje Podunavlje and Tikvara in Vojvodina
- Danube–Tisza Interfluve and Danube-Drava National Park in Hungary
- Ramsar Convention
- Vukovar Plateau
