= Croatia–Serbia border =

The border between Croatia and Serbia is part of their broader diplomatic relations. It mainly runs along the Danube river, in the northeast of Croatia and the northwest of Serbia. It is the subject of an ongoing Croatia–Serbia border dispute.

== History ==
=== Early evolution ===
The evolution of the Croatia–Serbia border began in 1699 with the Treaty of Karlowitz, transferring Slavonia and a portion of Syrmia from the Ottoman Empire to the Habsburg monarchy at the conclusion of the Great Turkish War. The rest of Syrmia was transferred to the Habsburg monarchy through the Treaty of Passarowitz in 1718. The transferred territories were organised within the monarchy into the Kingdom of Slavonia, with its eastern border established at the Danube, and the defensive belt of Military Frontier stretching along the Sava river, governed directly from Vienna.

Subsequent territorial changes in the region included the proclamation of the short-lived Serbian Vojvodina during the Hungarian Revolution of 1848, which included Syrmia as its territory. A year later Serbian Vojvodina was abolished and replaced by the crown land of the Voivodeship of Serbia and Banat of Temeschwar, which ceded Syrmia back to the Kingdom of Slavonia. In 1868, following the Croatian–Hungarian Settlement, the Kingdom of Slavonia was incorporated into the Kingdom of Croatia-Slavonia, before the Slavonian Military Frontier was fully annexed to Croatia-Slavonia in 1881. At the end of World War I in 1918, Croatia-Slavonia became a part of the State of Slovenes, Croats and Serbs, while Banat, Bačka and Baranja proclaimed direct unification to Kingdom of Serbia on 25 November 1918. They were formed after the division of Hungarian Baranya and Bács-Bodrog Counties along the "Clemenceau line" established through the Treaty of Trianon of 1920. The territory of southern Baranja was ceded to the Kingdom of Serbs, Croats and Slovenes on the premise, claimed by the Yugoslav delegation at the conference, that it formed a natural hinterland of the city of Osijek. The territory south of the "Clemenceau line" was distributed to administrative divisions in existence before First World War, with the territory being reorganised administratively later in 1922. All these territories were united under the Kingdom of Serbs, Croats and Slovenes (which was later renamed to Yugoslavia, in 1929).

=== Interwar period ===
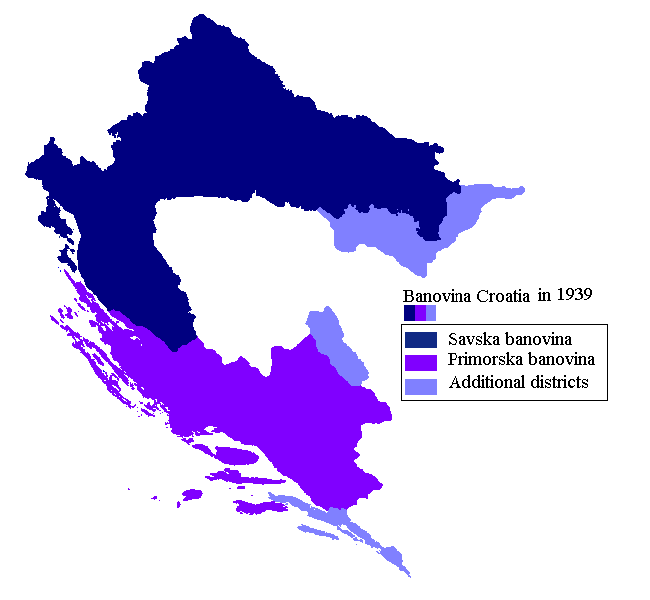
Banovina of Croatia, 1939–1941

Yugoslavia was established in 1918 as a centralised monarchy under the Serbian Karađorđević dynasty. In 1922, the territory was reorganised by oblasts. Baranja along with Bačka were incorporated into the Novi Sad oblast, Syrmium became a separate oblast with its seat in Vukovar, and Osijek was incorporated into the Slavonija oblast. By Royal Proclamation of 6 January 1929, the Constitution of 1921 was abolished, the parliament dissolved, and an absolutist monarchy proclaimed. The country was renamed the Kingdom of Yugoslavia and the territory was reorganised into banovinas. The greatest change concerning the region in dispute here occurred in Syrmia, with the districts of Vukovar, Vinkovci, Šid, Županja, and Sremska Mitrovica becoming part of the Drinska Banovina with its seat in Tuzla. The northern half of the disputed territory was incorporated along with Baranja and Bačka into the Danube Banovina. Two years later, in 1931, the districts of Vukovar, Vinkovci and Županja were transferred to Sava Banovina. A further territorial reorganisation was carried in 1939 as part of an agreement reached after intensive talks between authorities in Belgrade and opposition forces in Zagreb. The agreement known as Cvetković-Maček Agreement created the Banovina of Croatia. The creation of the Banovina of Croatia was the first step to the federalization of Yugoslavia, in which a Slovenian autonomous unit was also envisaged, while the rest of the country was to be a Serbian unit. In relation to the Croat-Serbs boundary, the 1939 delimitation of Banovina of Croatia included Šid and Ilok districts while no version of the agreement included Baranja in Croatia, meaning the northern half of the disputed area was to stay excluded from Croatia in all versions.

=== After 1945 ===
The first general outline of the post-1945 borders of Croatia was made by the Anti-Fascist Council for the National Liberation of Yugoslavia on 24 February 1945. Some issues regarding the border, such as Baranja, were left unresolved. The newly established Autonomous Province of Vojvodina, a part of the Socialist Republic of Serbia since April 1945, sought to establish its border with the Socialist Republic of Croatia along the Drava River, thus including Baranja, the Danube and along the Vukovar–Županja line. To counter the claims made by Vojvodina, Croatian authorities staked counterclaims in the areas of Vukovar, Vinkovci, Baranja and in the area of Sombor.

In order to settle the matter, the federal authorities set up a five-member commission presided over by Milovan Đilas in June 1945. The commission identified three sets of disputed territories. Those were the districts of Subotica, Sombor, Apatin and Odžaci in Bačka, districts of Batina and Darda in Baranja, and districts of Vukovar, Šid and Ilok in Syrmia. The districts in Bačka were awarded to Vojvodina, while those in Baranja were awarded to Croatia, both primarily along ethnic lines. The commission also noted that if Yugoslavia managed to acquire the region of Baja from Hungary, the decision regarding Bačka would be reviewed. The district of Vukovar was also awarded to Croatia, while Ilok and Šid were assigned to Vojvodina. In the case of Ilok, the decision was specified to be provisional until authorities are consolidated on either side of the boundary, when the issue would be reexamined.

Subsequently, the Serbian Parliament enacted a law establishing Vojvodina's borders. It referred to the boundary proposed by the Đilas commission explicitly noting that it was temporary. The law noted that the border follows the Danube from the Hungarian border to Ilok, crosses the Danube leaving Ilok, Šarengrad and Mohovo in Croatia then moves south and leaves the cadastral municipalities of Opatovac, Lovas, Tovarnik, Podgrađe, Apševci, Lipovac, Strošinci and Jamena in Croatia, and everything east of the line in Vojvodina. The awarding of Ilok to Croatia was a departure from the findings of Đilas commission and it was based on a referendum held in the town on the matter in 1945 or 1946, when its population voted to be added to Croatia.

=== After 1991 ===
After the breakup of Yugoslavia, the border dispute would become a contentious issue. Particular prominence was given to the dispute at the time of Croatia's accession to the European Union. The dispute remains unresolved, and the line of control mostly corresponds to Serbia's claim.

== Border crossings ==
There are currently 9 functioning border crossings between the two countries, one of which is a railway crossing. The following is a table of the crossing points, listed from North to South:

(Croatia) Croatian checkpoint	County	(Serbia) Serbian checkpoint	District	Route in Croatia	Route in Serbia	Opening times
Batina	Osijek-Baranja	Bezdan	West Bačka	D-212		24/7
Erdut	Osijek-Baranja	Bogojevo	West Bačka	D-213		24/7
Ilok 1	Vukovar-Srijem	Bačka Palanka	South Bačka		M-119	24/7
Ilok 2	Vukovar-Srijem	Neštin	South Bačka	local road	M-119	
Principovac 1	Vukovar-Srijem	Ljuba	Srem	local road	M-122	
Principovac 2	Vukovar-Srijem	Sot	Srem	local road	M-121	24/7
Tovarnik	Vukovar-Srijem	Šid	Srem		M-120	24/7
Tovarnik	Vukovar-Srijem	Šid	Srem	Railway	Railway	24/7
Bajakovo	Vukovar-Srijem	Batrovci	Srem			24/7

== Sources ==
- Klemenčić, Mladen; Schofield, Clive H. (2001). War and Peace on the Danube: The Evolution of the Croatia-Serbia Boundary. Durham, England: International Boundaries Research Unit. ISBN 9781897643419.
- Štambuk-Škalić, Marina (November 1995). "Hrvatska istočna granica u dokumentima 1945–1947" [Croatian Eastern Border in Documents 1945–1947]. Fontes (in Croatian). 1 (1). Zagreb, Croatia: Croatian State Archives: 153–329. ISSN 1330-6804.
