= Church of the Sacred Heart of Jesus, Šid =

Church of the Sacred Heart of Jesus
- Serbo-Croatian: Crkva srca Isusovog
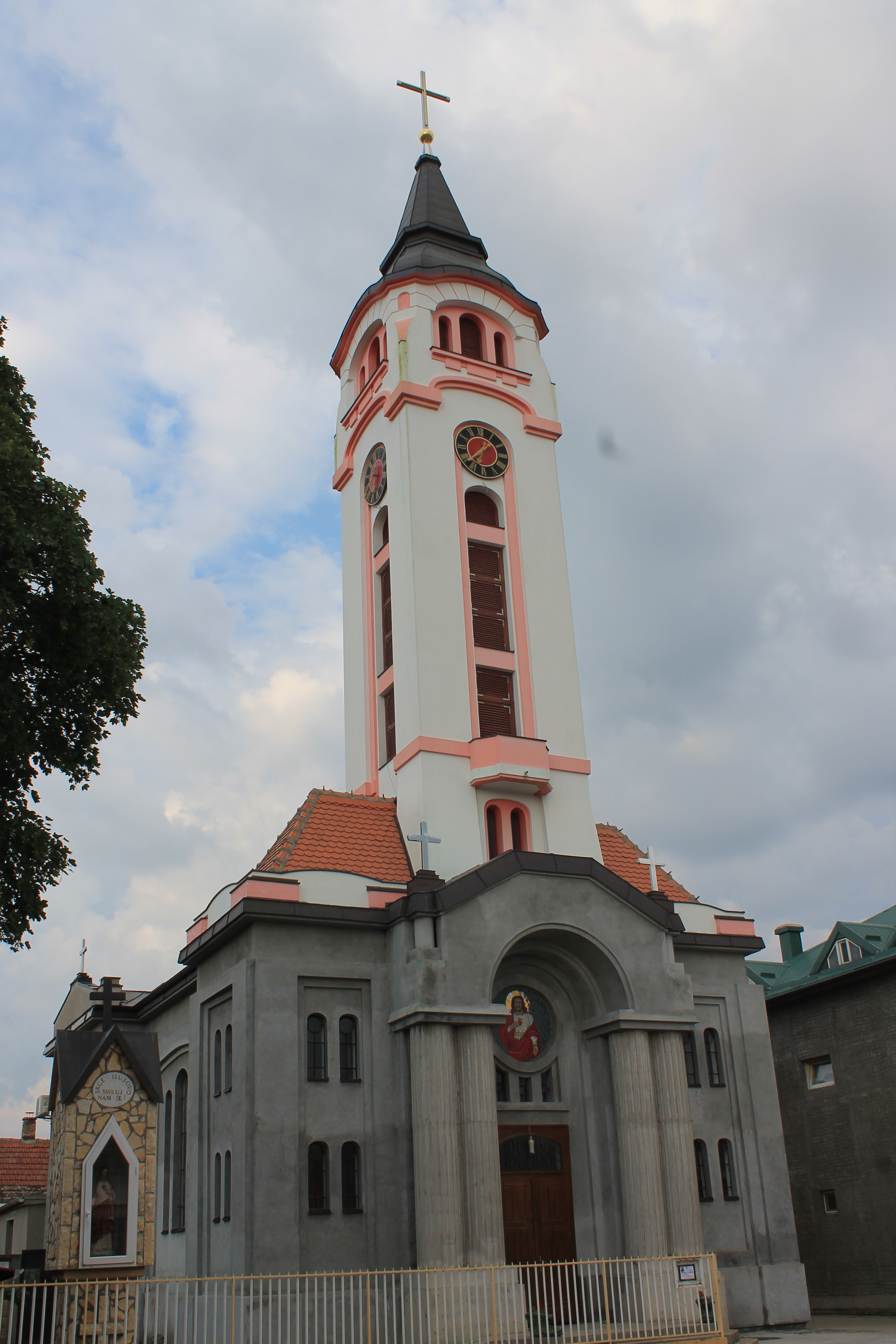
- View of the Church of the Sacred Heart of Jesus
- Church of the Sacred Heart of Jesus
- 45.1288°N 19.2257°E
- Location: Šid, Vojvodina
- Country: Serbia
- Denomination: Roman Catholic

History
- Status: Church
- Dedication: Sacred Heart of Jesus

Architecture
- Functional status: Active
- Architectural type: Secessionl
- Completed: 1932

Administration
- Archdiocese: Roman Catholic Diocese of Subotica

Church of the Sacred Heart of Jesus (Serbo-Croatian: Crkva srca Isusovog) is a Roman Catholic church located in Šid, Vojvodina, Serbia. The building was completed in 1932. The World War II temporary reconstruction was completed only in 1963 while the complete reconstruction was started again in 2010. 2010 project was based on the original +secession design from 1932 and was implemented by Šidprojekt.

== See also ==
- Church of St. Nicholas, Šid
- Slovak Evangelical Church, Šid
