= External border of the European Union =

Map of the European Union

Map of the EU, including all special territories. The Outermost Regions in blue are considered part of the EU's external borders.

The border of the European Union consists of the land borders that member states of the EU share with non-EU states adjacent to the union. The EU shares land borders with 21 countries and 3 dependencies.

== List ==
The lengths of the borders the European Union and the Overseas Countries and Territories (OCTs) (Note: The Overseas Countries and Territories (OCTs) are not part of the EU but they are associated with it. They depend to varying degrees on the Member States which have sovereignty over them.) share with different countries and territories are listed below. Maritime borders are not included.

=== Countries and dependencies bordering the EU ===
Country / Dependency	Length	Member states	Notes
Akrotiri and Dhekelia (U.K.)	156 km (97 mi)	Cyprus	Open border
Albania	212 km (132 mi)	Greece	
Andorra	118 km (73 mi)	Spain and France	Open border
Belarus	1,176 km (731 mi)	Latvia, Lithuania and Poland	
Bosnia and Herzegovina	956 km (594 mi)	Croatia	
Brazil	649 km (403 mi)	France	The border is located in French Guiana
Gibraltar (U.K.)	1.2 km (0.75 mi)	Spain	
Liechtenstein	34 km (21 mi)	Austria	Open border through Schengen
Moldova	683 km (424 mi)	Romania	
Monaco	6 km (3.7 mi)	France	Open border
Montenegro	19 km (12 mi)	Croatia	
Morocco	18.5 km (11.5 mi)	Spain	The border is located in Ceuta, Melilla and Peñón de Vélez de la Gomera
North Macedonia	396 km (246 mi)	Bulgaria and Greece	
Norway	2,375 km (1,476 mi)	Finland and Sweden	Open border through Schengen
Russia	2,435 km (1,513 mi)	Estonia, Finland, Latvia, Lithuania and Poland	
San Marino	37 km (23 mi)	Italy	Open border
Serbia	1,353 km (841 mi)	Bulgaria, Hungary, Croatia and Romania	
Sint Maarten (Kingdom of the Netherlands) (Note: Unlike the French side of the island, Sint Maarten is not part of the EU. It is among the Overseas Countries and Territories of the EU.)	16 km (9.9 mi)	France	Open border; located in Saint Martin
Suriname	556 km (345 mi)	France	The border is located in French Guiana
Switzerland	1,729 km (1,074 mi)	Germany, Austria, France and Italy	Open border through Schengen
Turkey	415 km (258 mi)	Bulgaria and Greece	
Ukraine	1,324 km (823 mi)	Hungary, Poland, Romania and Slovakia	
United Kingdom	499 km (310 mi)	Ireland and France (Note: The Channel Tunnel links the two countries underground and is defined as a 'land frontier', but it is not widely recognised as a land border.)	Open border with Ireland through the Common Travel Area
Vatican City	3.5 km (2.2 mi)	Italy	Open border

=== Countries and dependencies bordering Overseas Countries and Territories ===
Country / Dependency	Length	OCTs	Notes
Canada	1,280 m (4,200 ft)	Greenland (Kingdom of Denmark)	Located in Hans Island
Australian Antarctic Territory (Australia)	N/A	French Southern and Antarctic Lands (France)	Located in Antarctica. Most countries do not recognize Antarctic territorial claims
British Antarctic Territory (U.K.)	N/A	French Southern and Antarctic Lands (France)	Located in Antarctica. Most countries do not recognize Antarctic territorial claims
Queen Maud Land (Norway)	N/A	French Southern and Antarctic Lands (France)	Located in Antarctica. Most countries do not recognize Antarctic territorial claims
Ross Dependency (New Zealand)	N/A	French Southern and Antarctic Lands (France)	Located in Antarctica. Most countries do not recognize Antarctic territorial claims
Argentine Antarctica (Argentina)	N/A	French Southern and Antarctic Lands (France)	Located in Antarctica. Most countries do not recognize Antarctic territorial claims
Chilean Antarctic Territory (Chile)	N/A	French Southern and Antarctic Lands (France)	Located in Antarctica. Most countries do not recognize Antarctic territorial claims

=== Disputed territory ===
The northern part of Cyprus is legally part of the EU, but the terms of the acquis communautaire, the EU's body of laws, have been suspended due to it being under the control of the Turkish Republic of Northern Cyprus, a self-proclaimed de facto state which is recognized only by Turkey. The two entities are separated by the United Nations Buffer Zone in Cyprus, which serves as a de facto boundary between them.

== Border status and cooperation ==
In 2004 the European Union developed the European Neighbourhood Policy (ENP) for the promotion of cooperation between the EU and its neighbours to the east and south of the European territory of the EU (i.e., excluding its outermost regions outside of Europe), which, in part, includes the Cross-Border Cooperation programme aimed at the promotion of economic development in border areas and ensuring border security.

== External border control ==
The Border and Coast Guard Agency, more commonly known as Frontex, was established in 2004. Its main task is external border control of the Schengen Area. Most of its activities are coordinated with the coast and border guards of member states.

== See also ==
- Schengen Area
- Frontex
