= Kuzman Kolarić =

Serbian painter

Kuzman Kolarić was a Serbian painter who worked in the lands under the dominion of the Habsburg dynasty during the late baroque and early Rococo periods of the eighteenth century.

Kolarić is credited to have worked on many icons in churches and monasteries in Fruška Gora and the villages and towns of Berkasovo, Šid, Tekija, Petrovaradin.

Kuzman Kolarić's work is on the monasteries of Staro Hopovo, Novo Hopovo, Privina Glava, and Lepavina.
