= Ruthenian Court, Šid =

Ruthenian Court
- Руски двор (Serbian); Руски двор (Pannonian Rusyn)
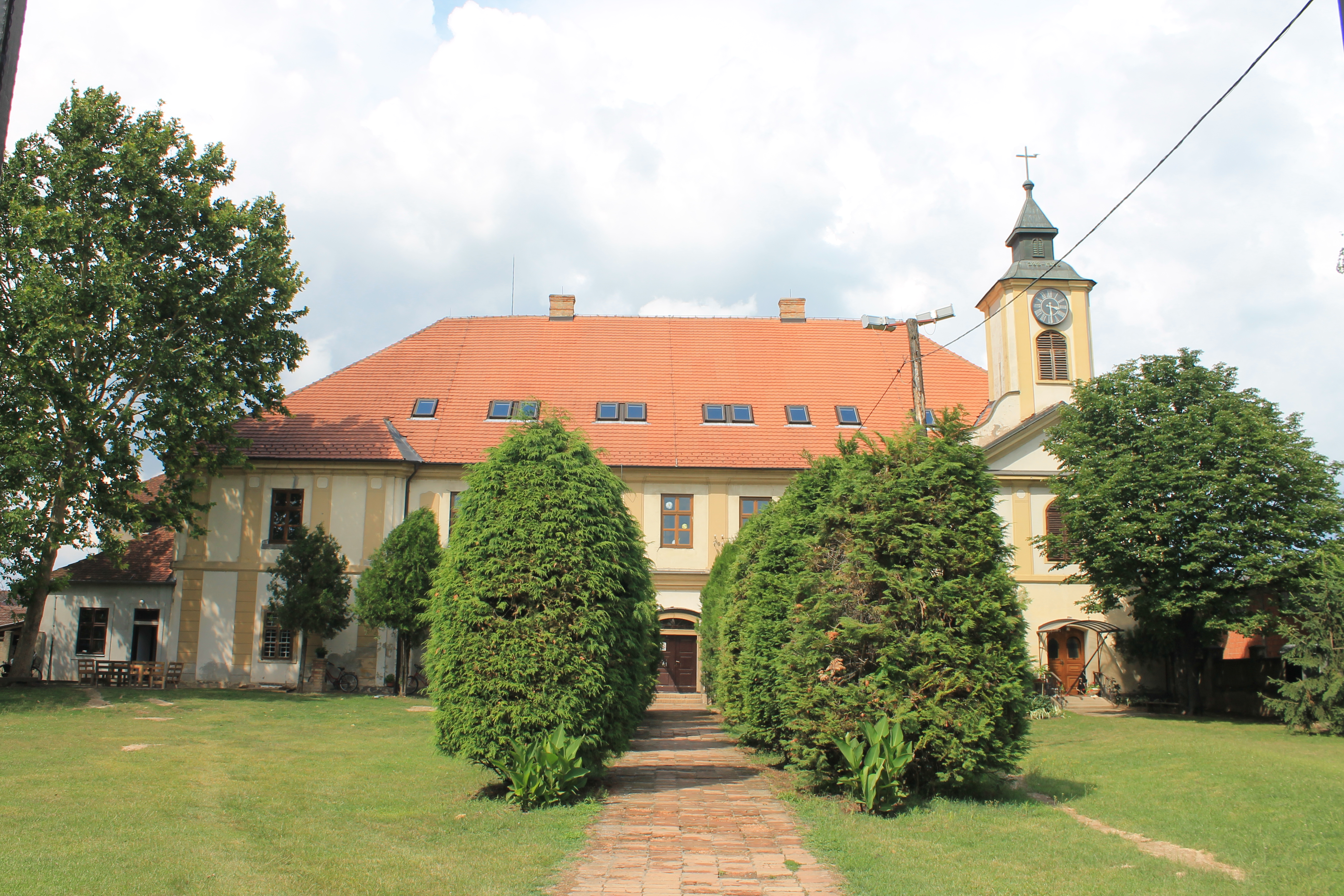
- Interactive map of the Ruthenian Court area

General information
- Architectural style: baroque
- Location: Šid, Vojvodina, Serbia
- Coordinates: 45°08′11″N 19°14′03″E
- Year built: 1780

Cultural Heritage of Serbia
- Type: Cultural Monument of Great Importance
- Designated: 14 March 1967
- Reference no.: СК 1358

The Ruthenian Court (Serbo-Croatian: Руски двор, Ruski dvor, Pannonian Rusyn: Руски двор) in Šid in Vojvodina, Serbia is a representative building constructed as a summer residence for the Greek Catholic Eparchy of Križevci. The name of the building is sometimes mistranslated as a Russian Palace due to the archaic homonyms used for the possessive adjectives related to the local Pannonian Rusyns (predominantly Greek Catholic community) and ethnic Russians.

== Background ==
The building was completed in 1780 and granted to the eparchy by the royal decree of Maria Theresa. It was protected as a cultural heritage building in 1967 and received the designation Immovable Cultural Heritage of Great Importance in 1991.

A female monastery was opened in the building in the 1930s, and during World War II in Yugoslavia, it served as a hospital for Yugoslav Partisans, which had a stronghold on the nearby Fruška Gora.

== See also ==
- Greek Catholic Church of Croatia and Serbia
