= Gibarac =

Gibarac Гибарац (Serbian)
- Village (Selo)
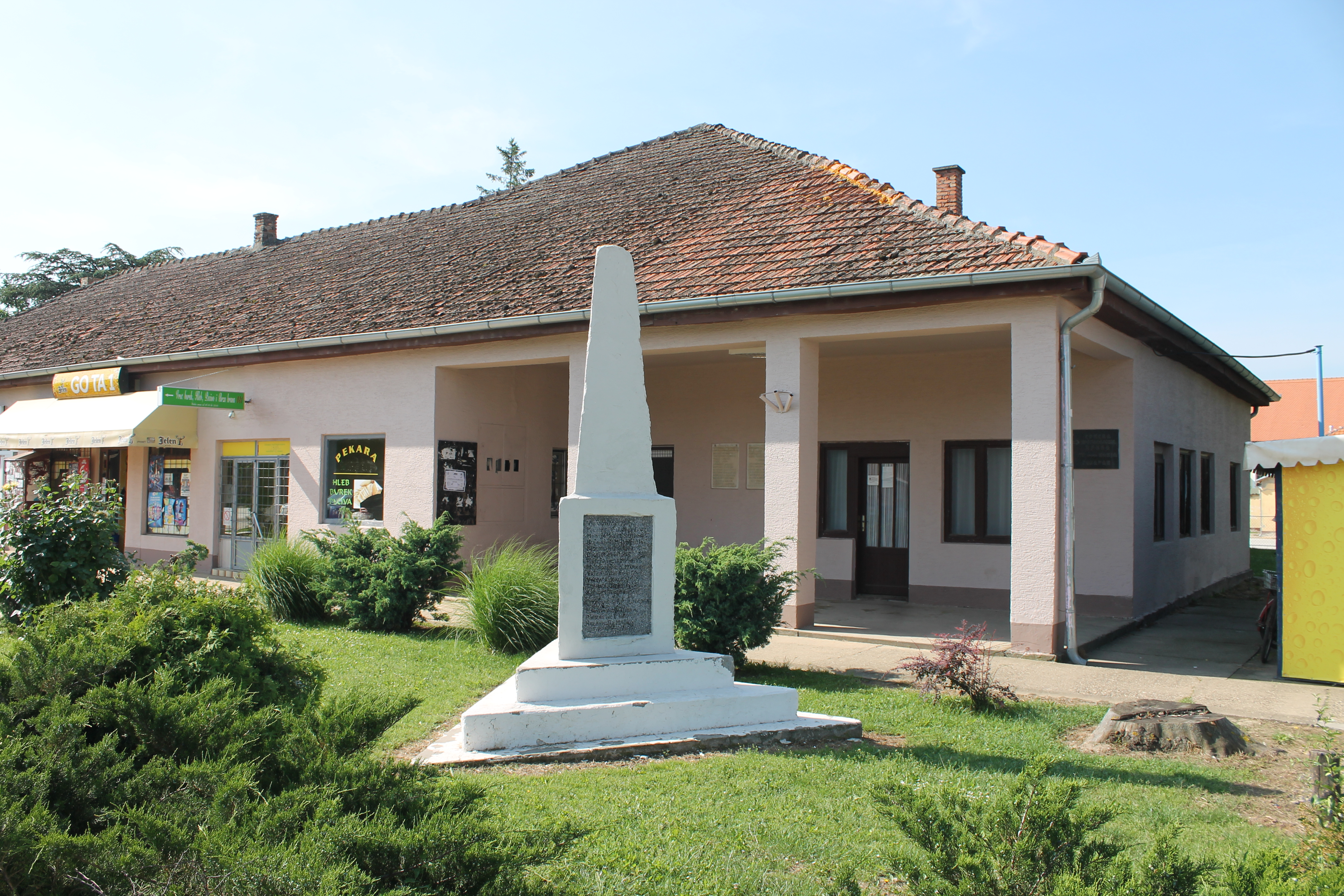

- Location within Vojvodina Location within Serbia Location within Europe
- Coordinates: 45°06′N 19°16′E
- Country: Serbia
- Province: Vojvodina
- Region: Syrmia
- District: Srem
- Municipality: Šid

Population (2002)
  - Total: 1,158
- Time zone: UTC+1 (CET)
  - Summer (DST): UTC+2 (CEST)

Gibarac (Serbian Cyrillic: Гибарац) is a village in Serbia. It is situated in the Šid municipality, in the Srem District, Vojvodina province. The village has a Serb ethnic majority and its population numbering 1,158 people (2002 census).

== History ==
According to demographic research, Gibarac exists under this same name since 1370. Before the Yugoslav wars, the village had Croat ethnic majority.

== See also ==
- List of places in Serbia
- List of cities, towns and villages in Vojvodina
