= Church of St. Nicholas, Šid =

Church of St. Nicholas
- Храм светог Николе
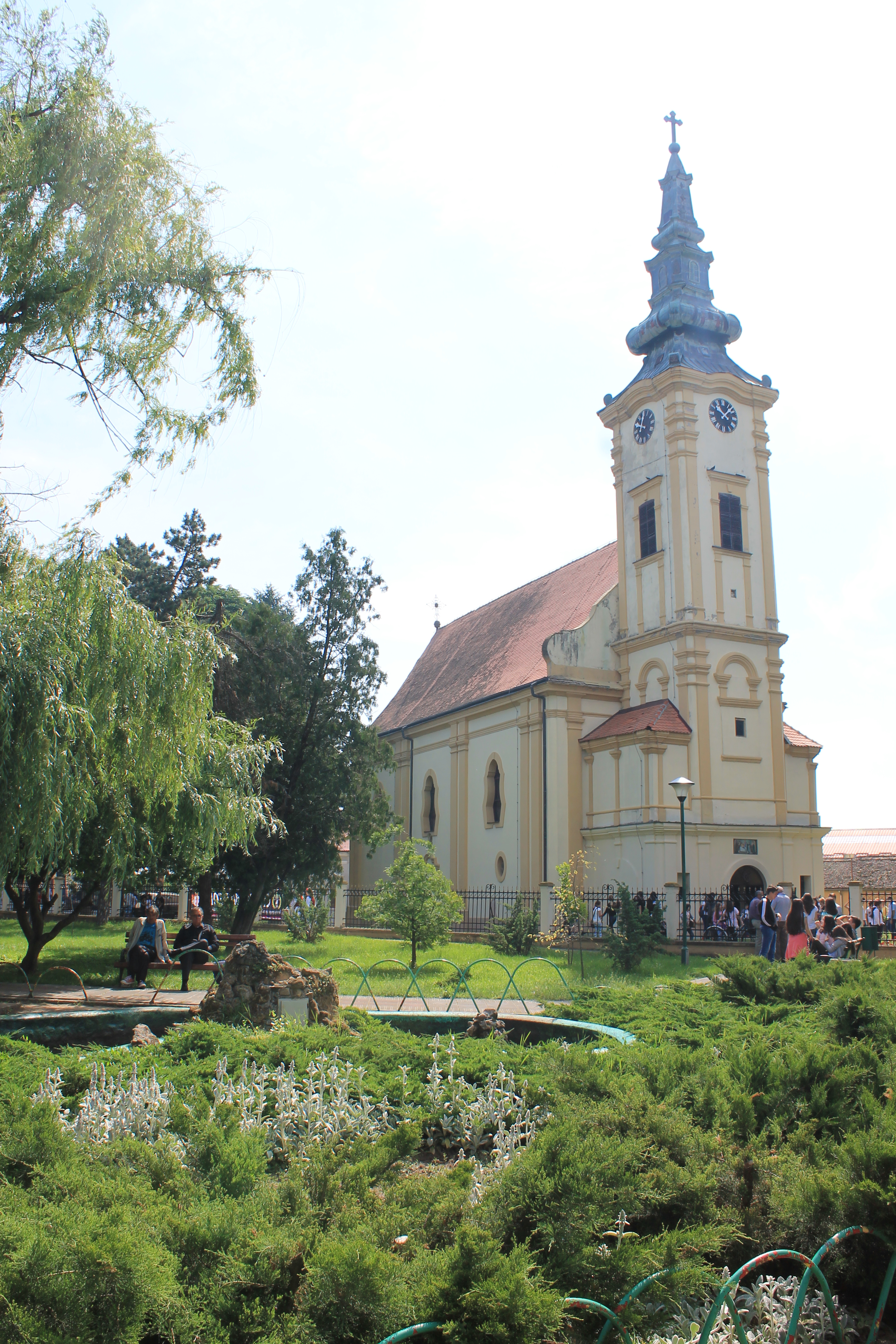
- Church of St. Nicholas
- Church of St. Nicholas
- 45.1278°N 19.2279°E

Cultural Heritage of Serbia
- Type: Cultural Monument of Great Importance
- Designated: 30 December 1997
- Reference no.: СК 1357
- Location: Šid
- Country: Serbia
- Denomination: Serbian Orthodox

History
- Dedication: Saint Nicholas

Architecture
- Style: Baroque and Classicism
- Years built: 1780

Administration
- Archdiocese: Eparchy of Srem

The Church of St. Nicholas (Serbian Cyrillic: Храм светог Николе) in Šid is Serbian Orthodox church in Vojvodina, Serbia. The church is dedicated to Saint Nicholas. It is the primary centrally located Eastern Orthodox church in the town and a protected cultural monument. The building was constructed in the second half of the 18th century and completed in 1780. At the time, modern day Vojvodina was a part of the Habsburg monarchy in which Šid was located close to the Ottoman Serbia. At the time of the construction of the Eastern Orthodox church in Šid, Habsburg Monarchy (nominally protector of the Roman Catholic church ever since the time of Counter-Reformation) implemented numerous legal reforms such as Declaratory Rescript of the Illyrian Nation and Patent of Toleration which improved legal standing of the Eastern Orthodox subjects.

The church in Šid is a single-nave building with a semicircular apse and a high bell tower. The iconostasis was painted in 1767 by Grigorije Nikolić, a painter from Zemun. Sombor painter Jovan Nedeljković was invited to renew the iconostasis in 1825. The building is facing east-west direction with entry door and bell tower at the western wall.

== Gallery ==
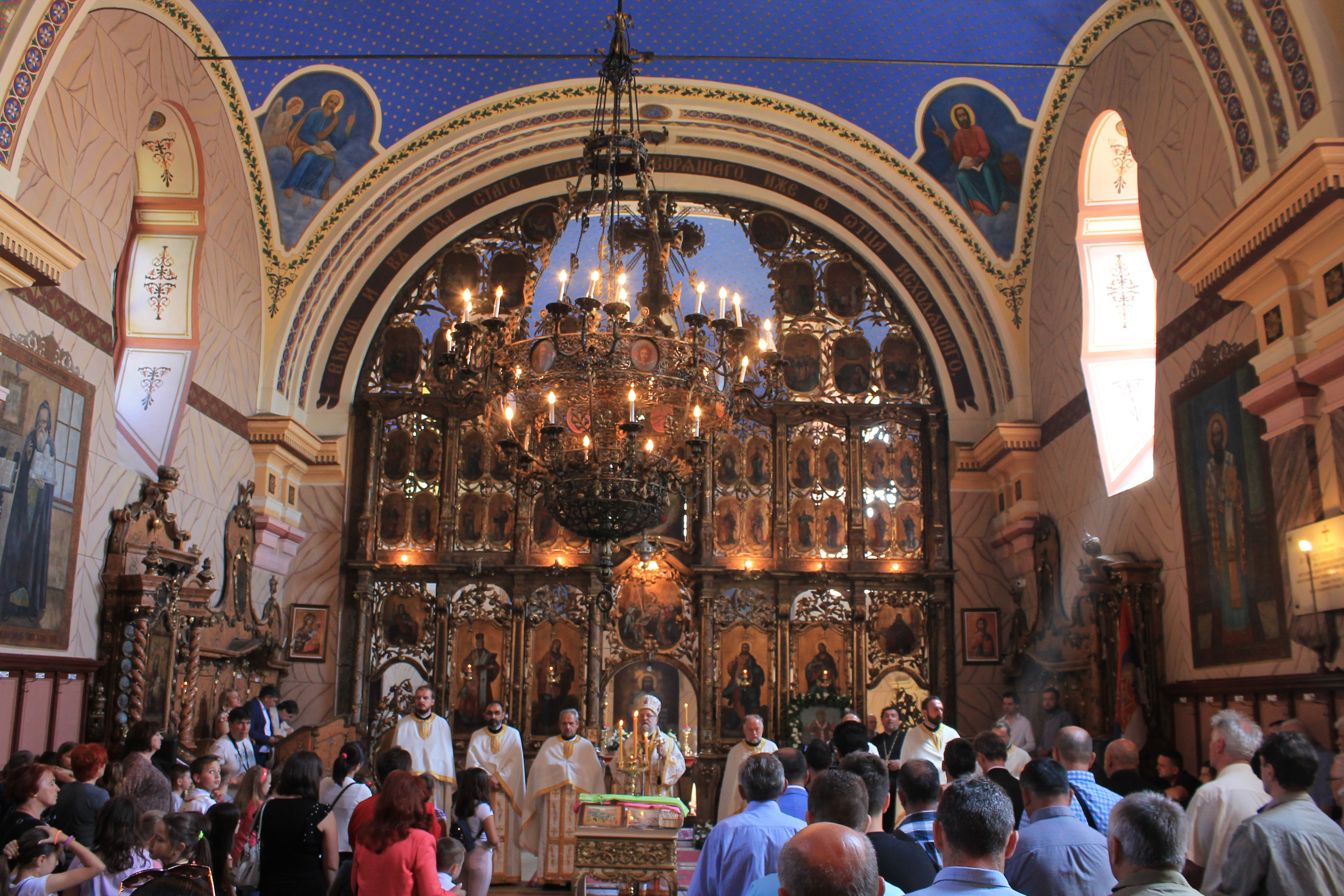
Interior

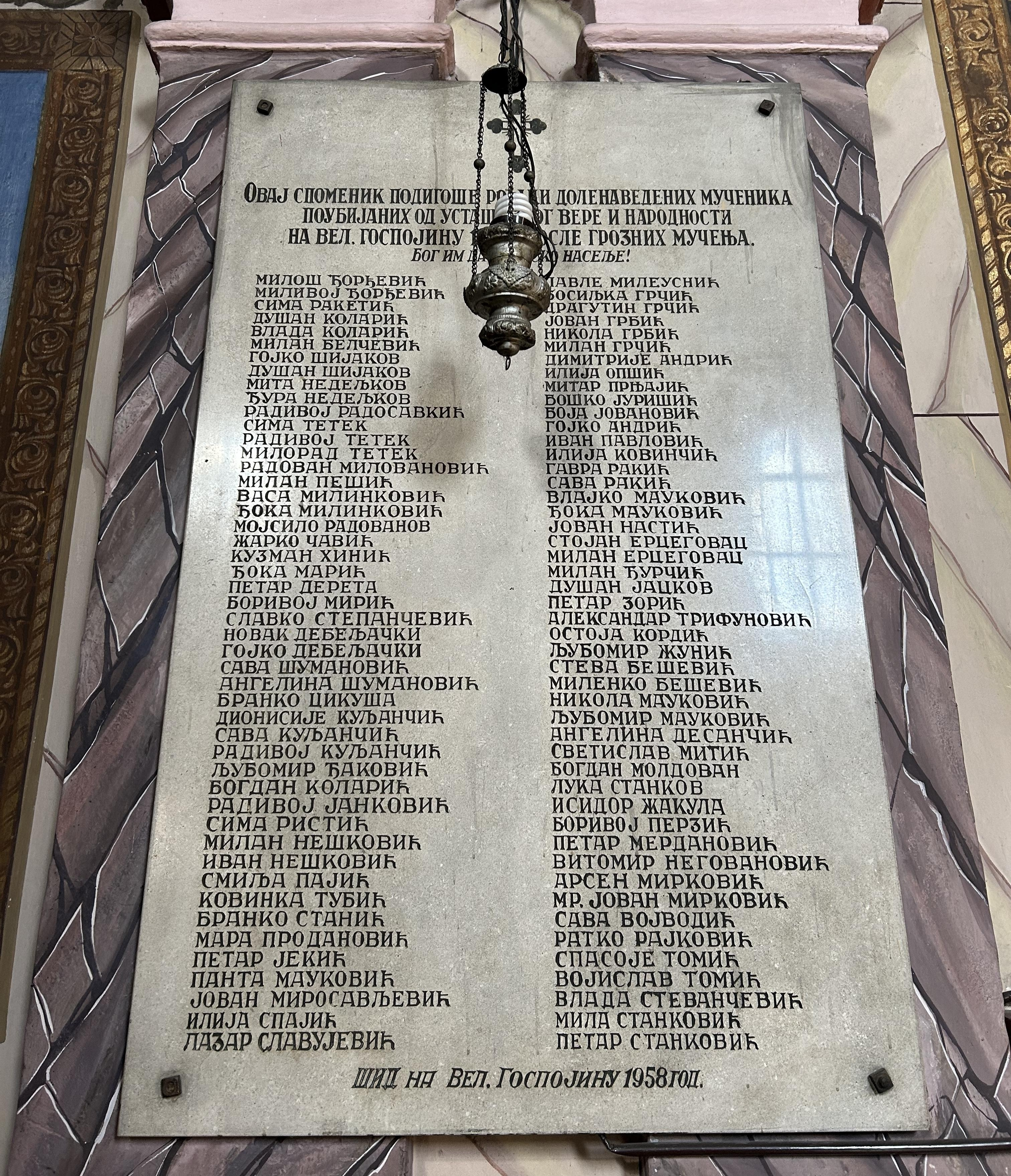
Plaque commemorating local Serbs who were killed by the Ustashe.

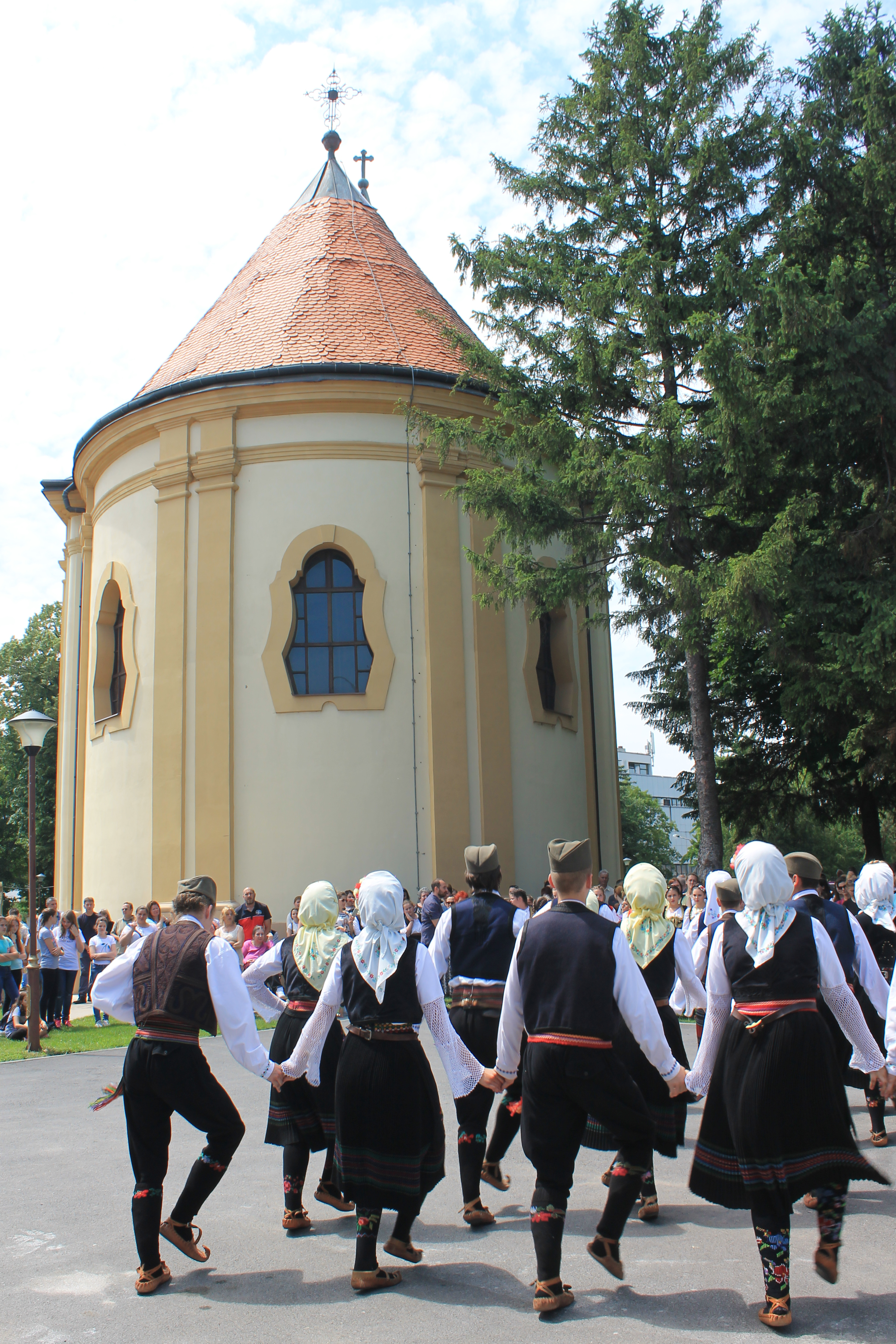
Traditional dance next to the church building

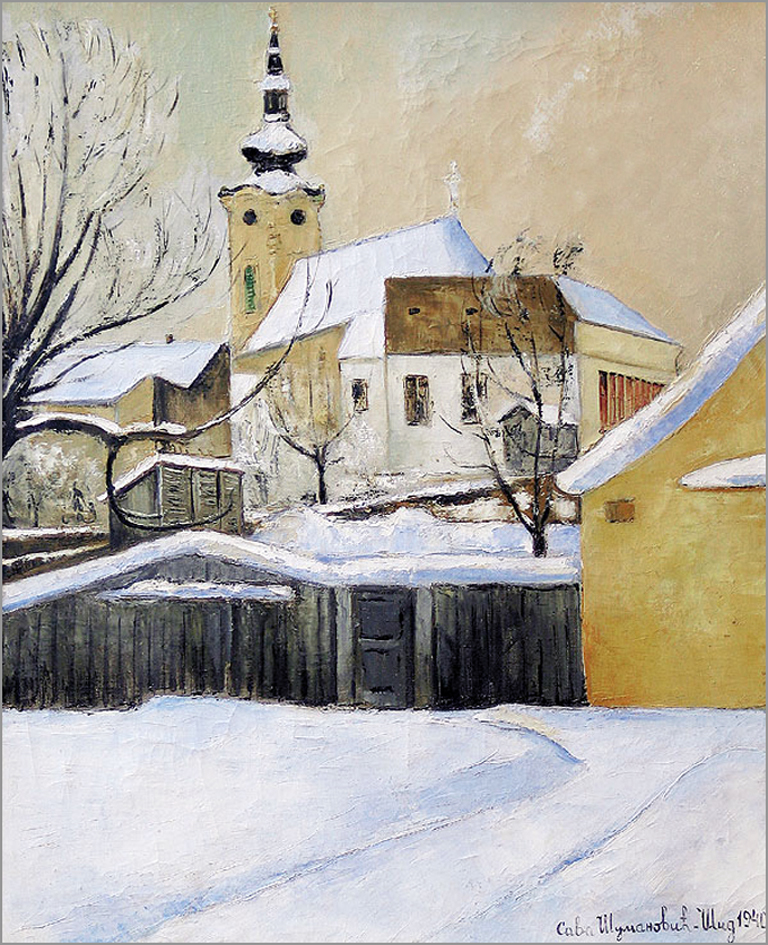
Šid Church on the painting of Sava Šumanović

== See also ==
- Privina Glava Monastery
- Eparchy of Srem
- Syrmia
- Serbs of Vojvodina
