= Adaševci =

Adaševci Адашевци (Serbian)
- Village (Selo)
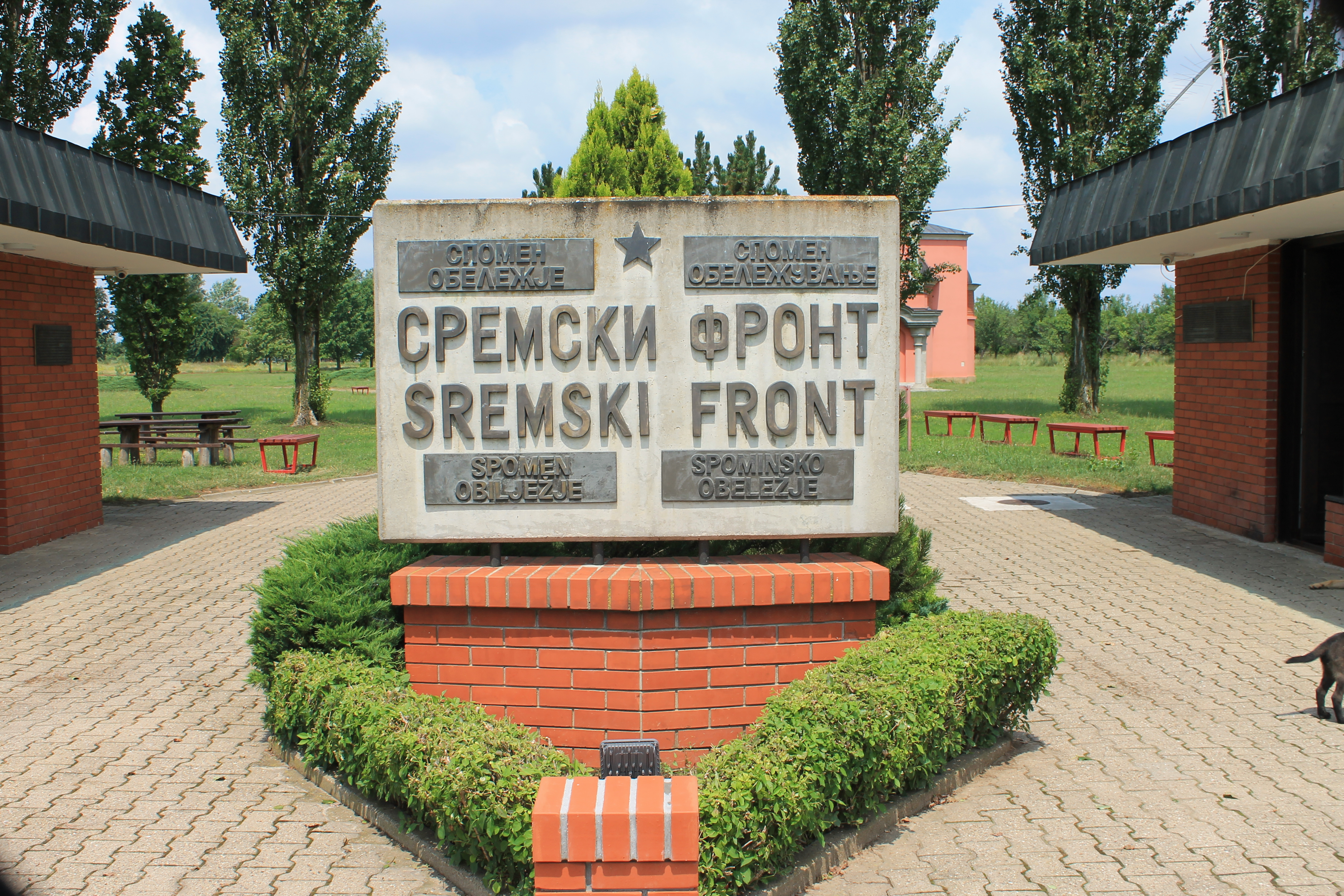
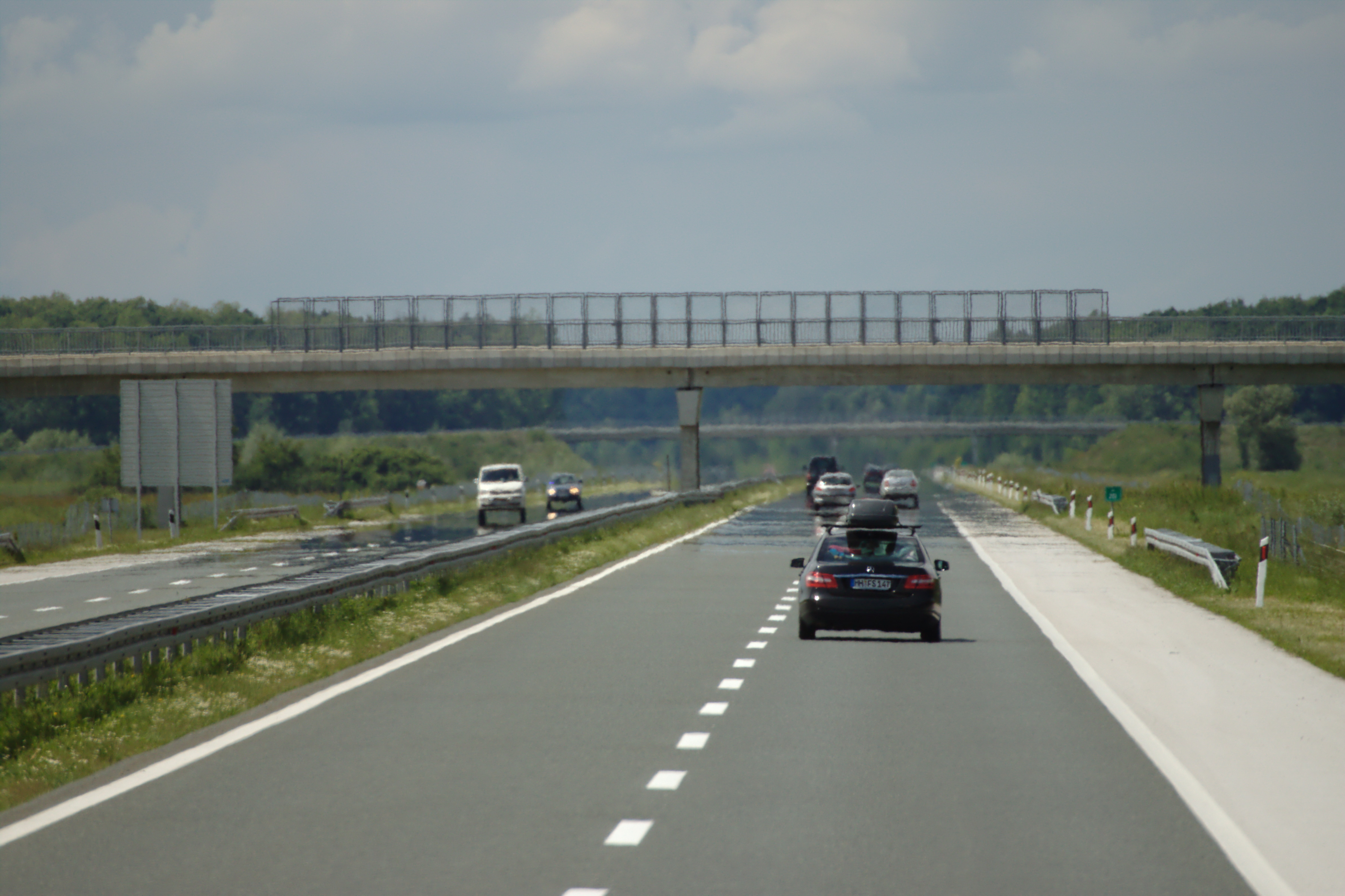
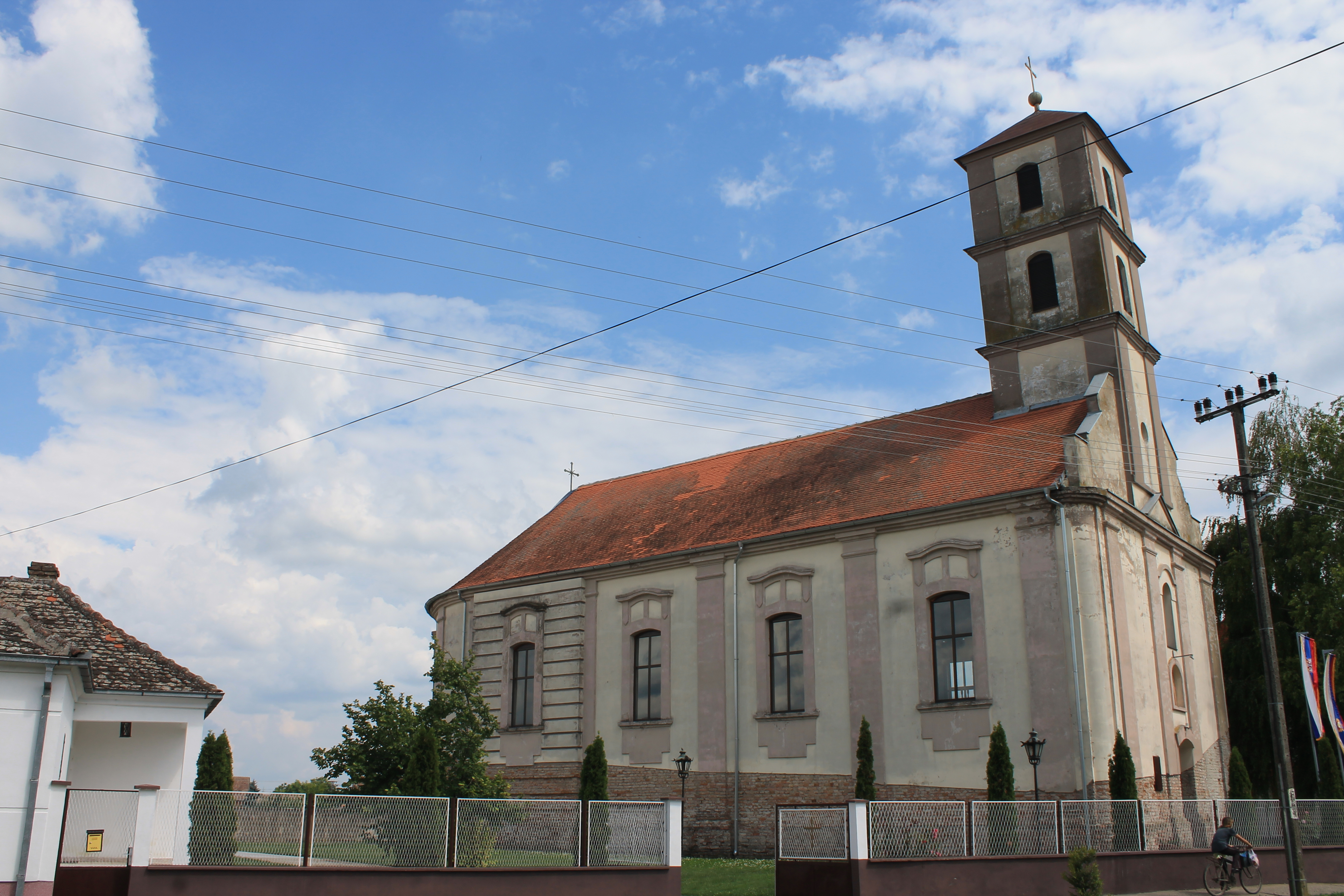
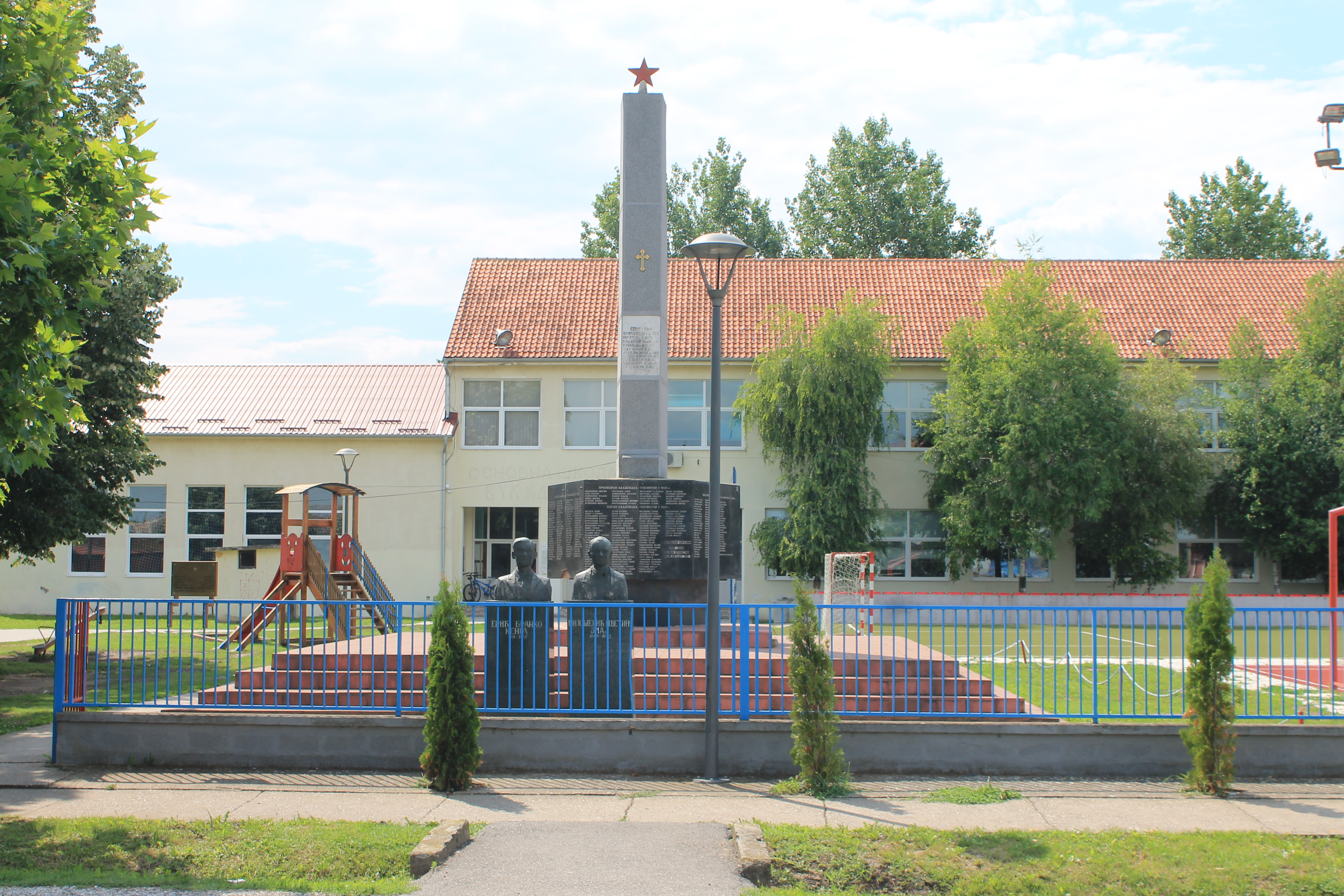
- Adaševci

- Location within Vojvodina Location within Serbia Location within Europe
- Coordinates: 45°5′N 19°13′E
- Country: Serbia
- Province: Vojvodina
- Region: Syrmia
- District: Srem
- Municipality: Šid

Area
  - Total: 53.68 km^{2} (20.73 sq mi)

Population (2011)
  - Total: 1,919
  - Density: 35.75/km^{2} (92.59/sq mi)
- Time zone: UTC+1 (CET)
  - Summer (DST): UTC+2 (CEST)

Adaševci (Serbian Cyrillic: Адашевци) is a village located in the municipality of Šid, Srem District, Vojvodina, Serbia. The village has a Serb ethnic majority and its population numbering 1,919 people (2011 census).

Adaševci is located 5 kilometers south of Šid, in large part on the west side bordering the river Bosut, near the village there is an international highway. In the village there is a memorial "Sremski Front", as well as a source of thermal water. Today, Adaševci is one of the largest villages in the municipality of Šid. In the village there is a cultural centre which can accommodate about 500 guests and is used for various cultural and sporting events. The largest number of young people gathers F.K. "Adaševci", founded in 1924, which compete in the municipal league. Adaševci have a primary school built in 1952, which today has 400 pupils. Mostly the agricultural town have its own water supply with 12 kilometers of water supply network, with regular supply of quality drinking water. Adaševci with its geographical location have great potential for tourism development and improving quality of life.

== Name ==
The name of the village in Serbian is plural.

== History ==
Pendants with duck heads from the 8th century BC were found in the town in 1955.

== Demographics ==
Historical population

- 1961: 2,562
- 1971: 2,566
- 1981: 2,363
- 1991: 2,080
- 2002: 2,166
- 2011: 1,919

== See also ==
- List of places in Serbia
- List of cities, towns and villages in Vojvodina
