= Milenka Subić =

Serbian politician

- Born: 1970 (age 55–56); Šid, Serbia
- Occupations: Politician, economist
- Known for: Member, National Assembly of Serbia

Milenka Subić (Serbian Cyrillic: Миленка Субић; born 1970) is a politician in Serbia. She has served in the National Assembly of Serbia since 2020 as a member of the Serbian Progressive Party.

== Private career ==
Subić was born in Šid, Vojvodina, in what was then the Socialist Republic of Serbia in the Socialist Federal Republic of Yugoslavia. She earned a bachelor's degree in economics. In 2018, she was appointed to a municipal committee in Šid on the evaluation of projects in the field of public information. She has also served as coordinator for Roma issues in the municipality.

== Politician ==
Subić is a member of the Progressive Party's board in Šid. She received the 145th position on the party's Aleksandar Vučić — For Our Children electoral list in the 2020 Serbian parliamentary election and was elected to the national assembly when the list won a landslide majority with 188 out of 250 mandates. She is a member of the assembly committee on labour, social issues, social inclusion, and poverty reduction; a deputy member of the committee on finance, state budget, and control of public spending; a deputy member of the agriculture, forestry, and water management committee; and a member of Serbia's parliamentary friendship groups with Bosnia and Herzegovina, China, Croatia, Cyprus, Greece, Ireland, Italy, North Macedonia, Poland, Portugal, Russia, and Turkey.
