= St Catherine Church, Sot =

St Catherine Church
- Župna crkva Svete Katarine
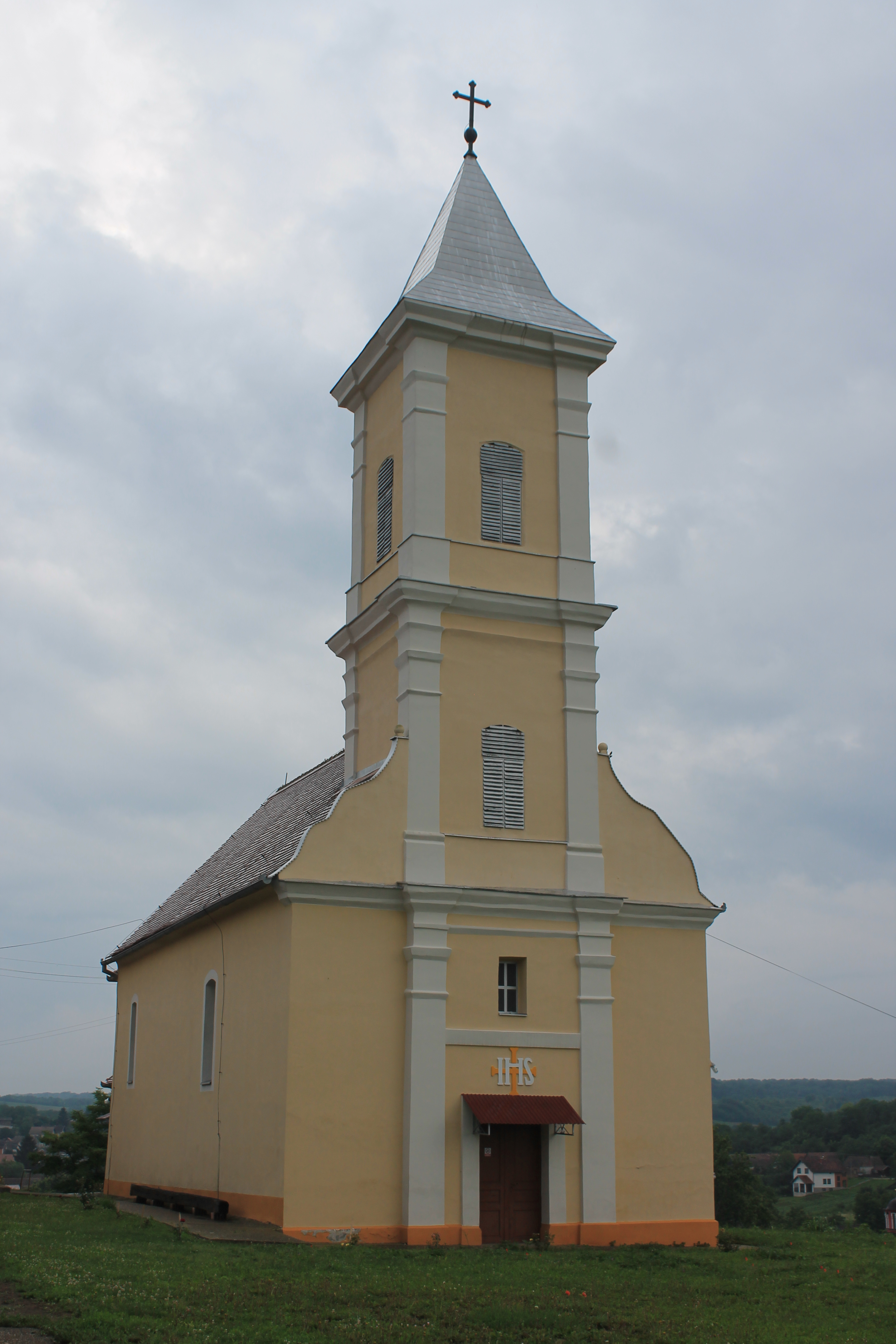
- St Catherine Church
- St Catherine Church
- 45°09′34″N 19°19′01″E
- Location: Sot, Vojvodina

Cultural Heritage of Serbia
- Type: Cultural Monument of Great Importance
- Designated: 30 December 1997
- Reference no.: СК 1365
- Country: Serbia
- Denomination: Roman Catholic

History
- Dedication: St Catherine of Alexandria

Architecture
- Style: Neoclassicism
- Years built: 1747

Administration
- Diocese: Srijem

The Church of Saint Catherine (Serbo-Croatian: Crkva svete Katarine) is a Catholic parish church in the village of Sot in Vojvodina, Serbia, part of Roman Catholic Diocese of Srijem.

The church building was constructed in 1747. The building is protected as the Monument of Culture of Great Importance. As one of the older standing religious buildings in Syrmia region, the building has undergone several modifications and extensions during its existence.
