= Šid =

Šid Шид (Serbian) Šíd (Slovak) Шид (Pannonian Rusyn)
- Town and municipality
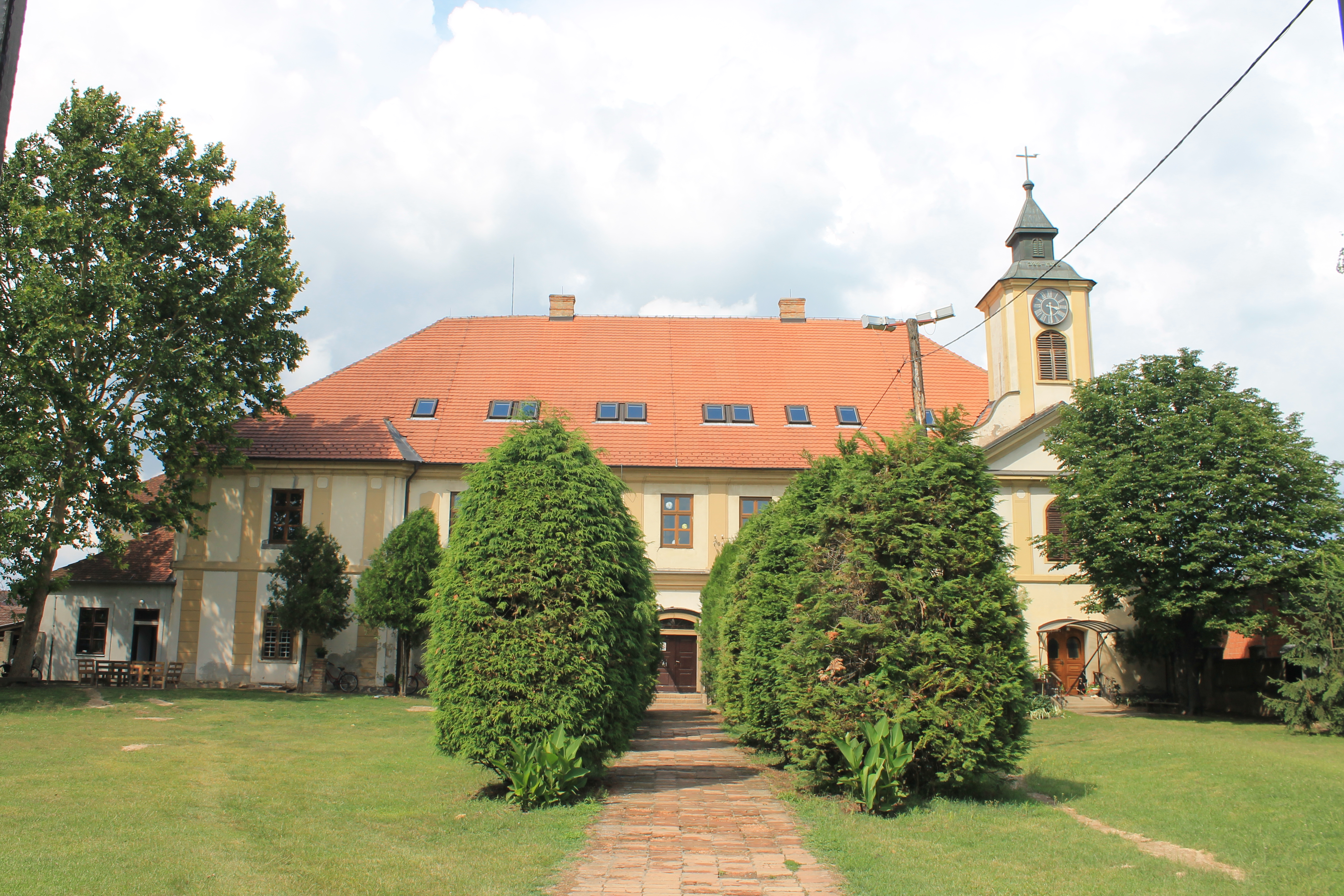
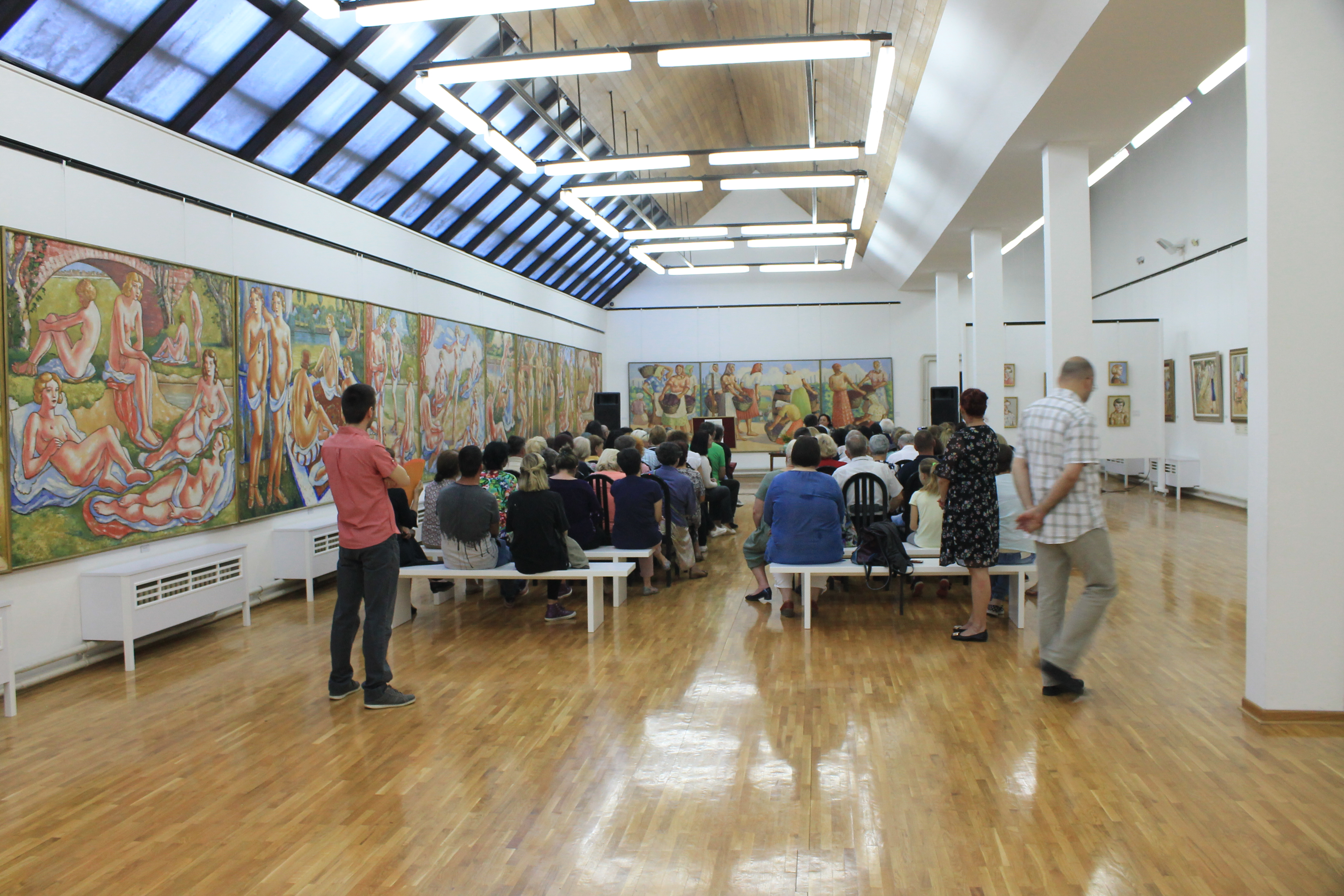
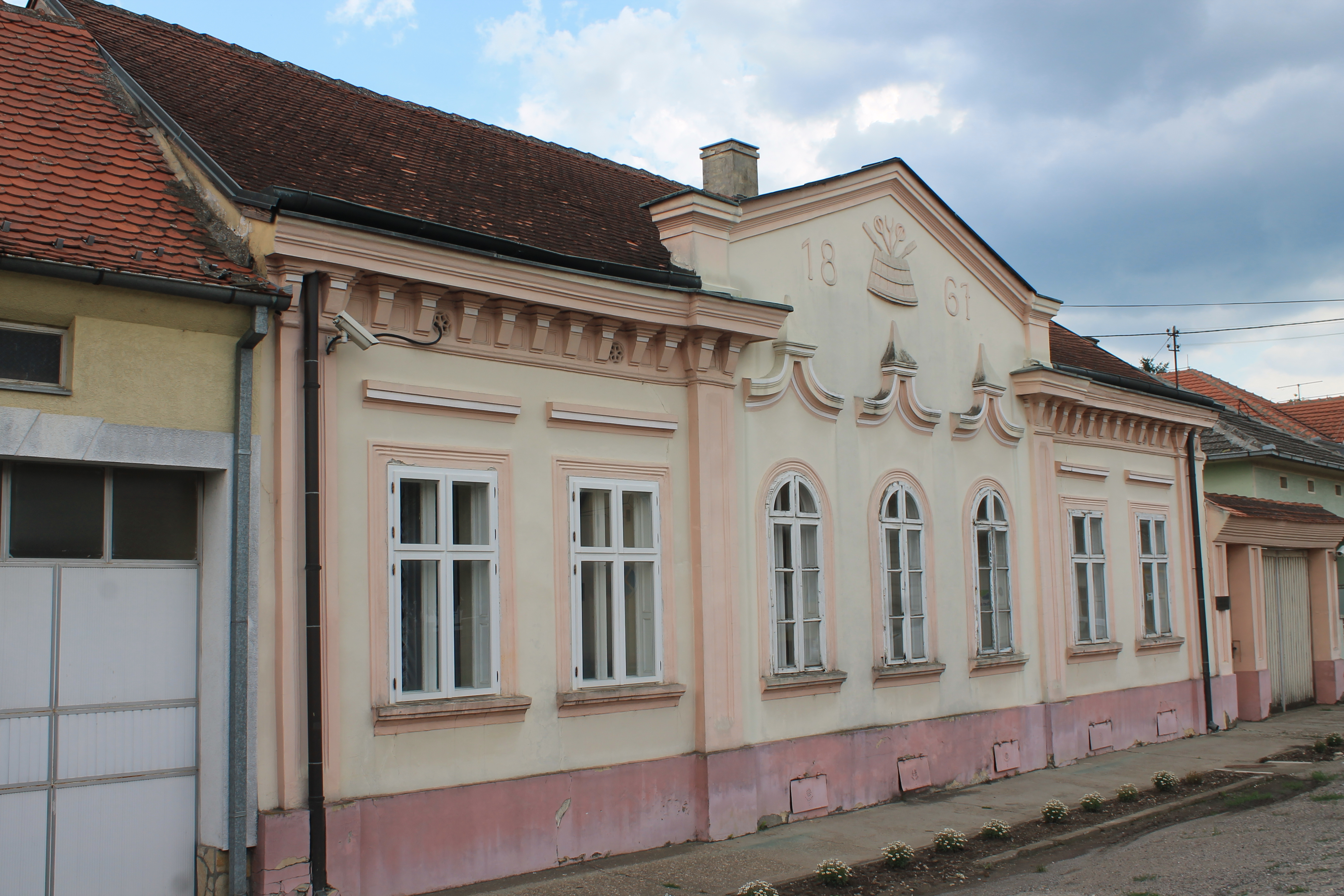
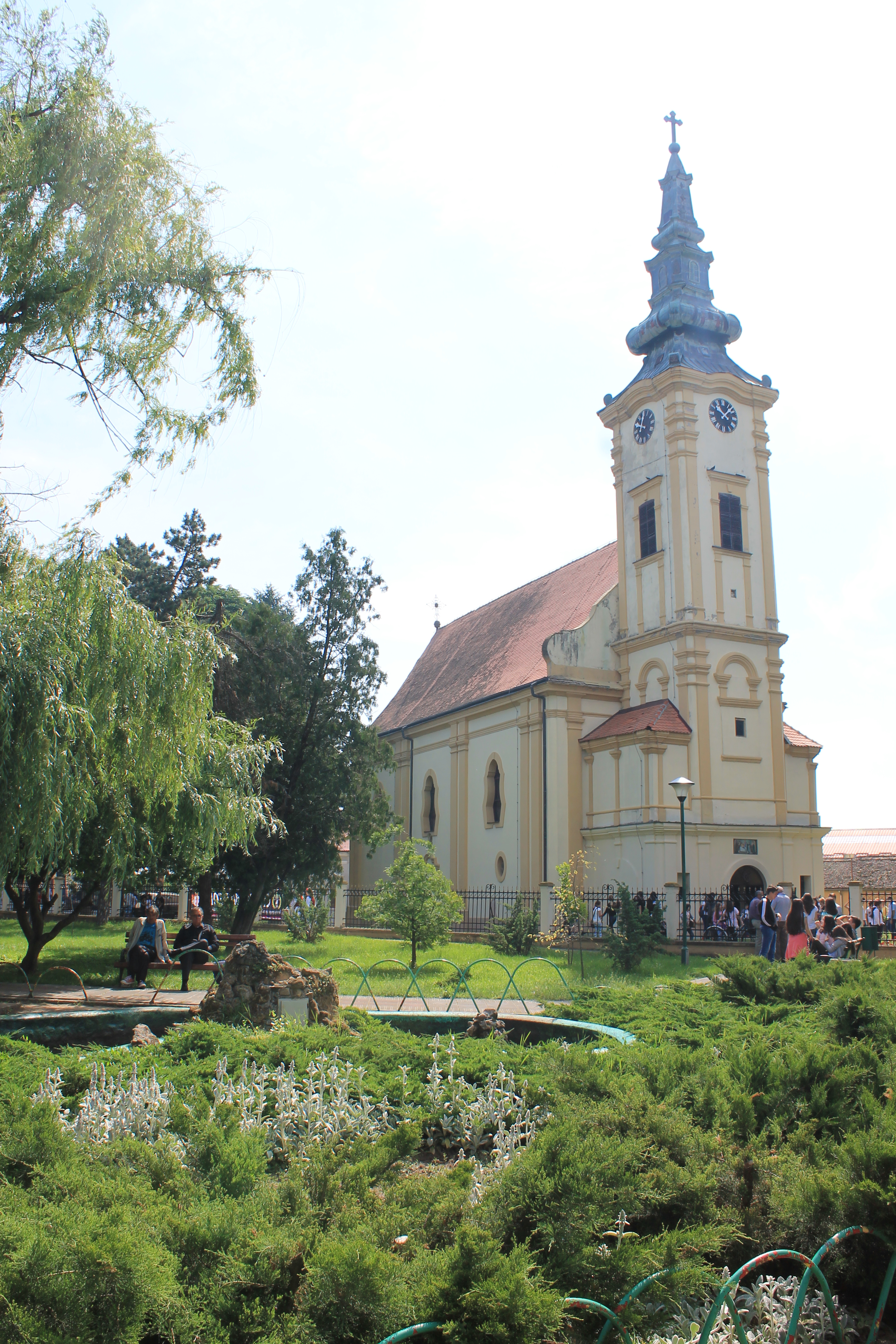
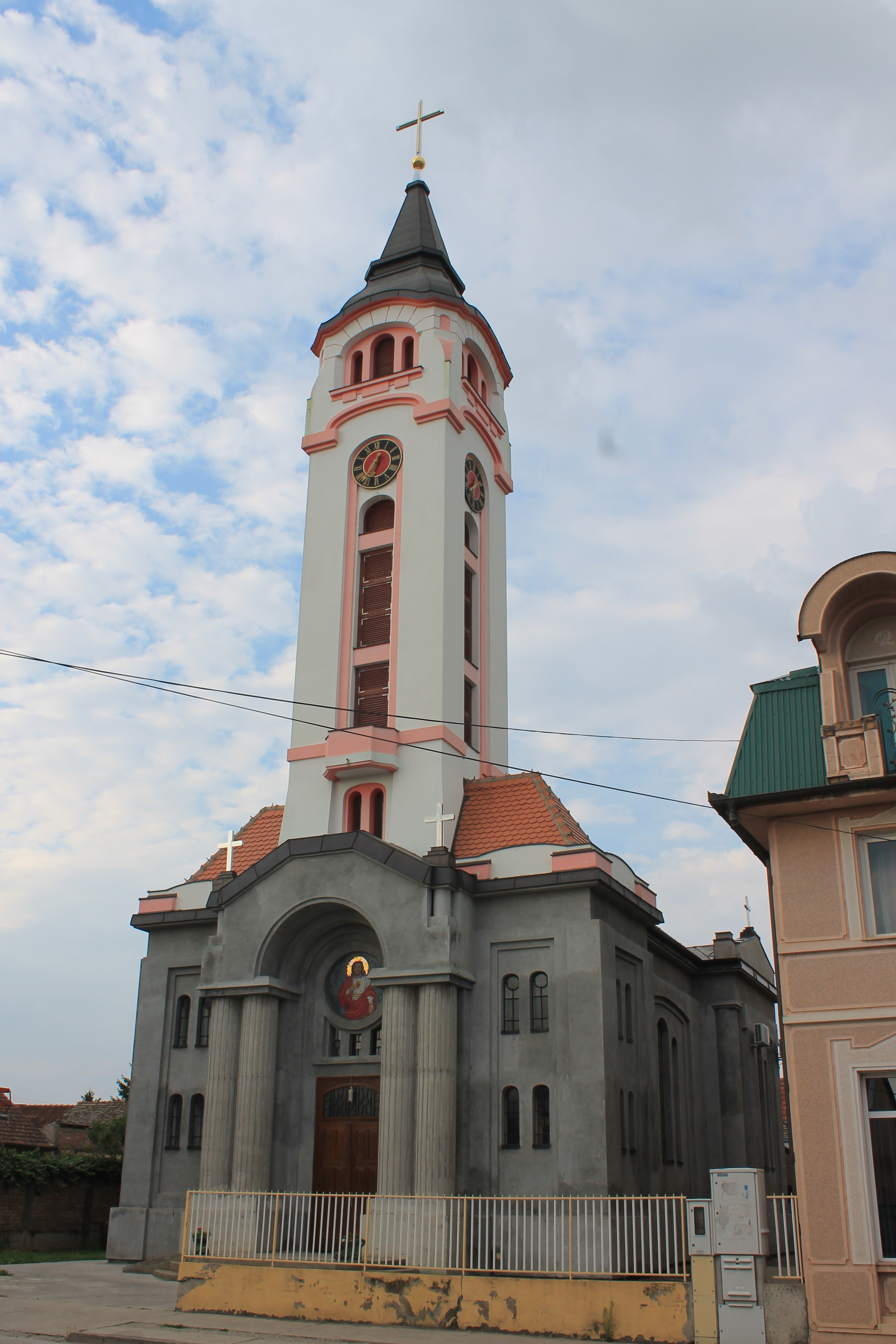
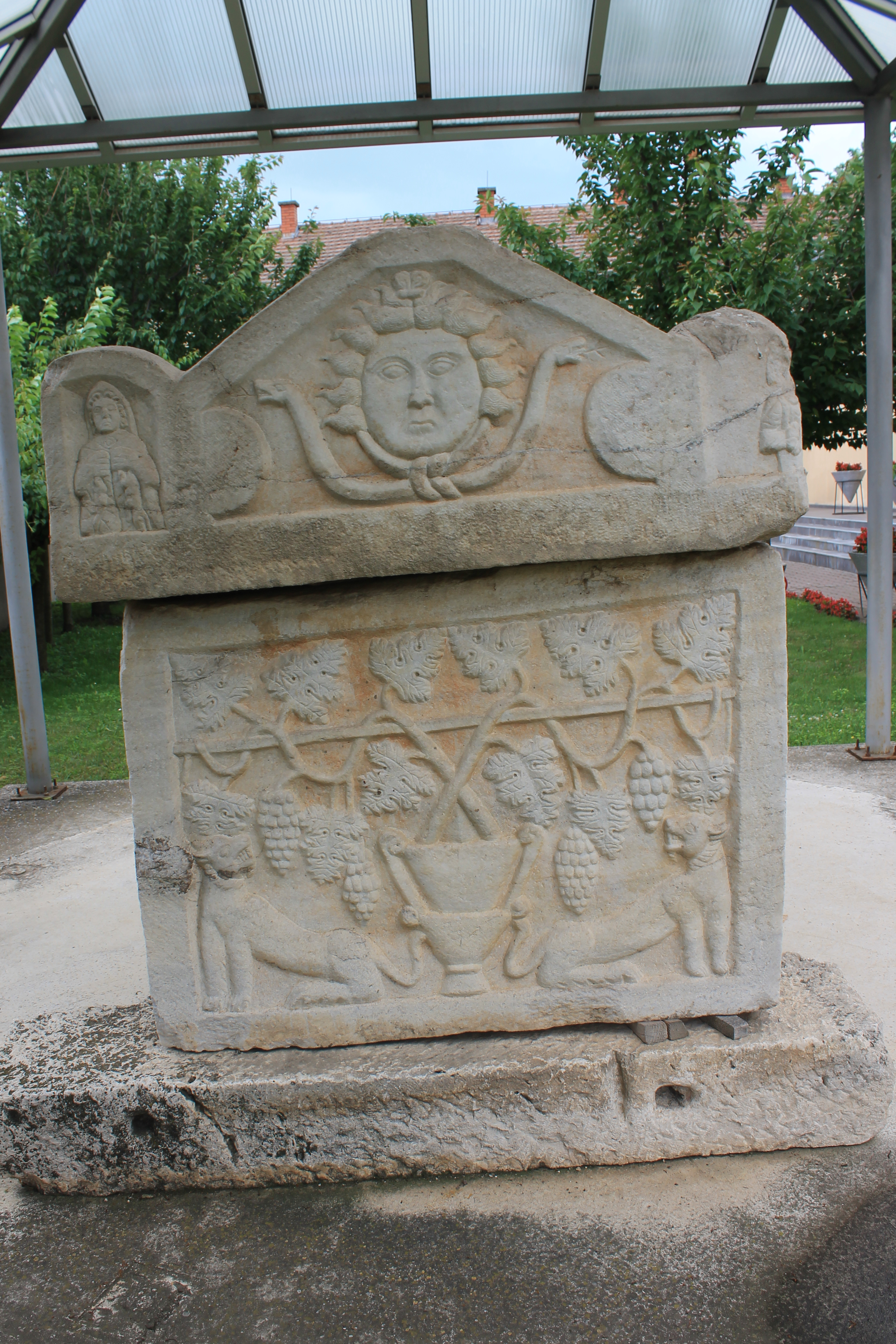
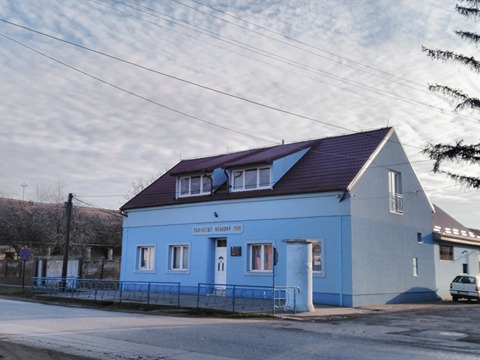
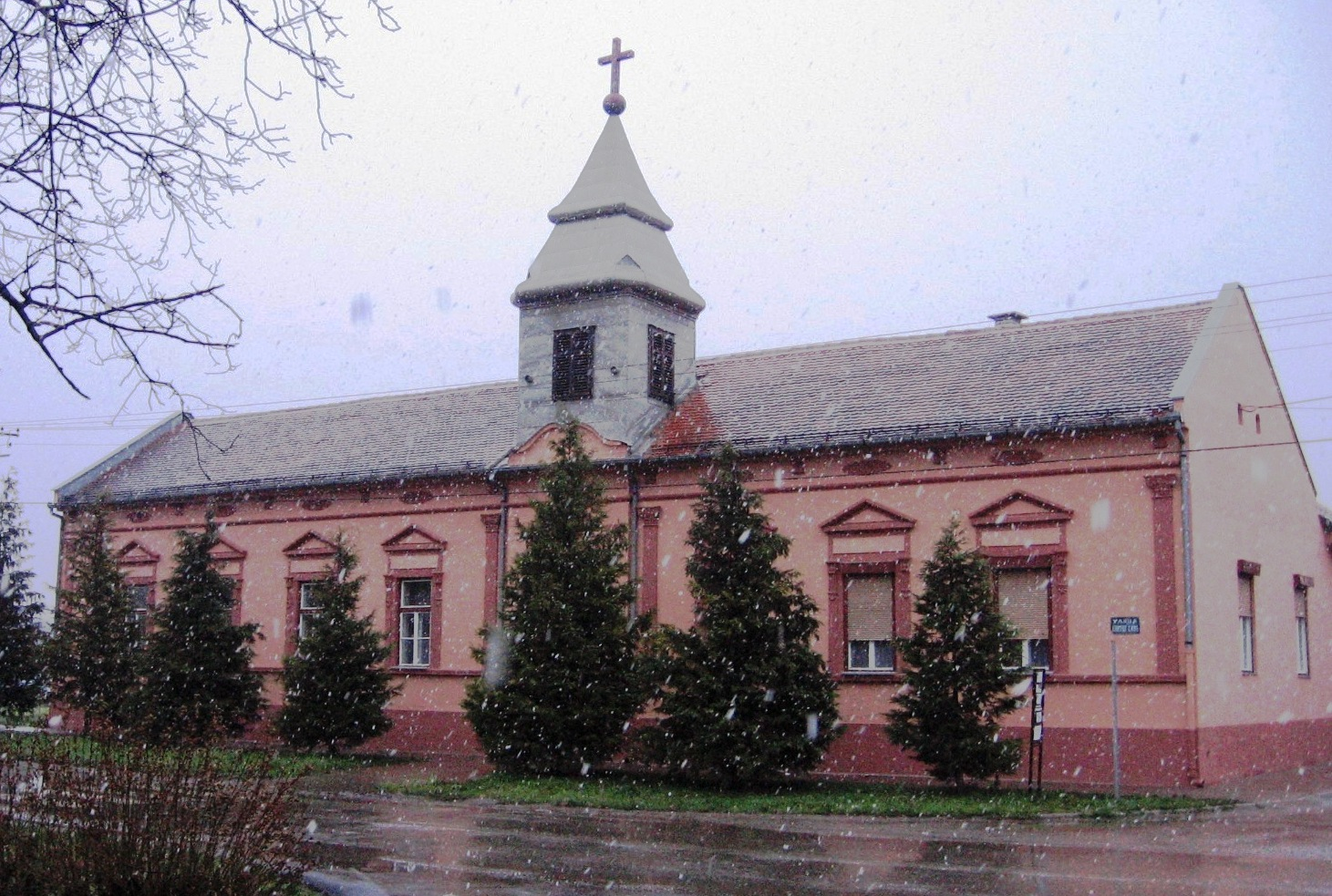
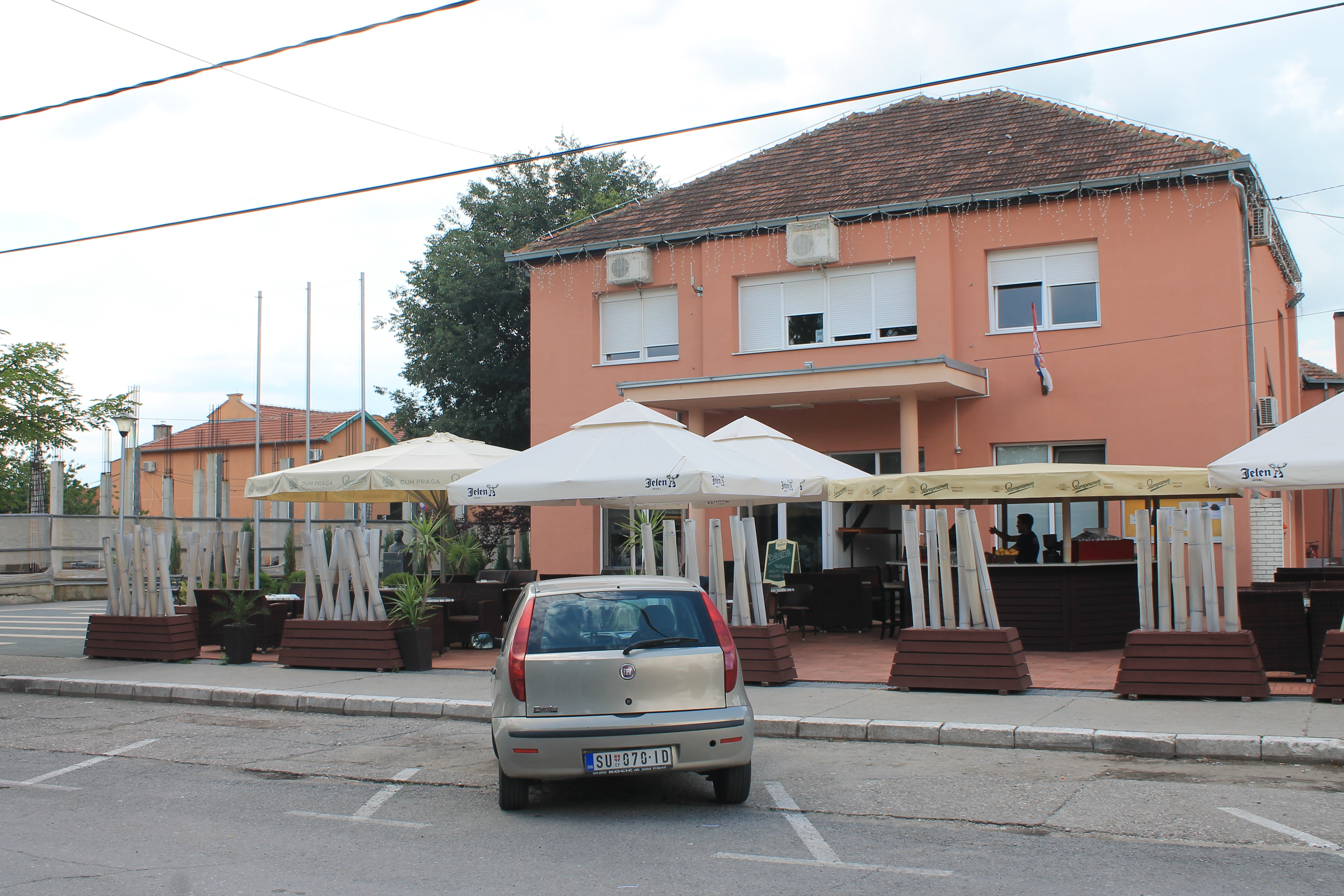
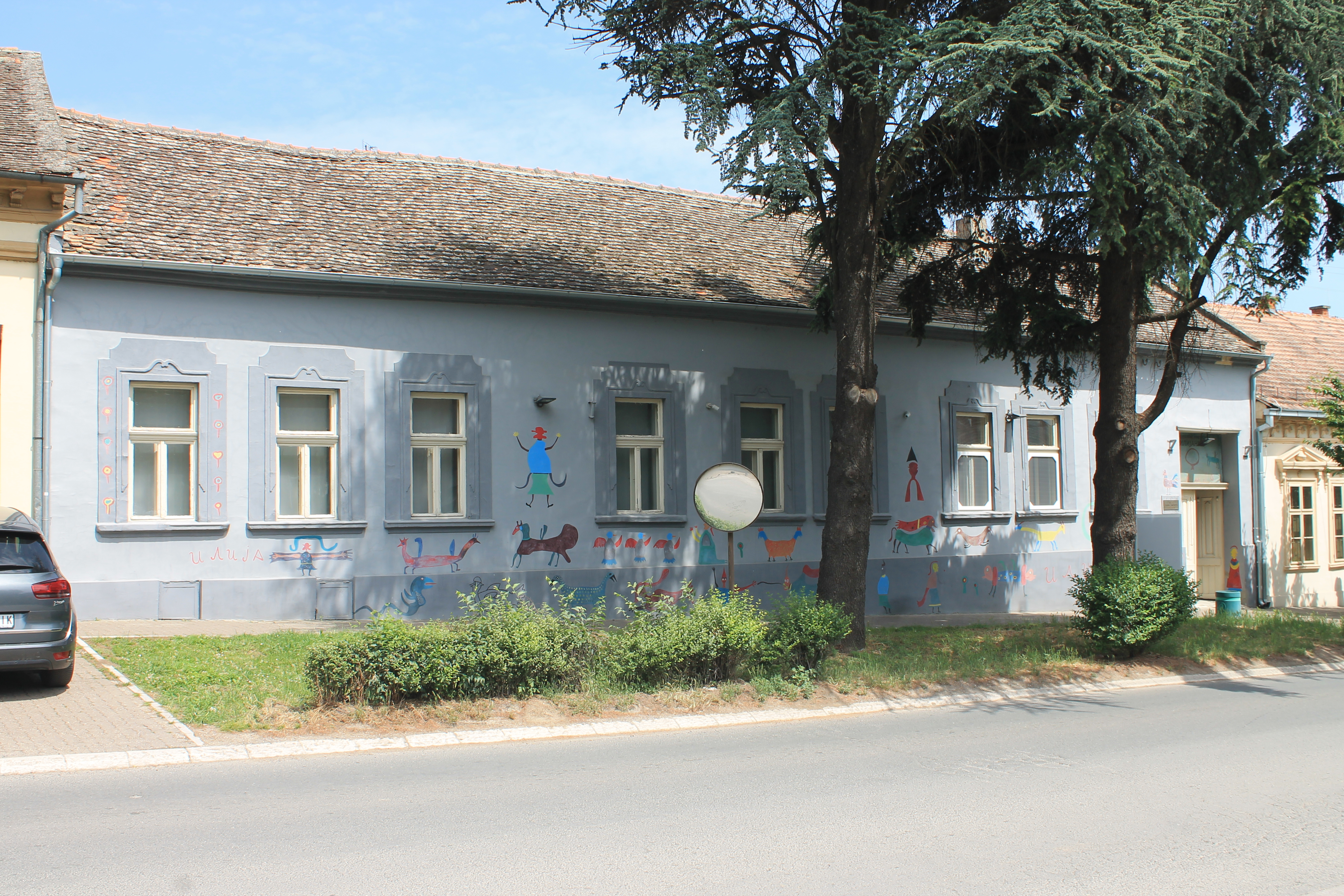
- Ruthenian Court Sava Šumanović Gallery Sava Šumanović's Birth House Church of St. Nicholas Church of the Sacred Heart of Jesus Beljnjača Necropolis Slovak Centre Slovak Evangelical Church Šid Cultural Centre Naive Art Museum

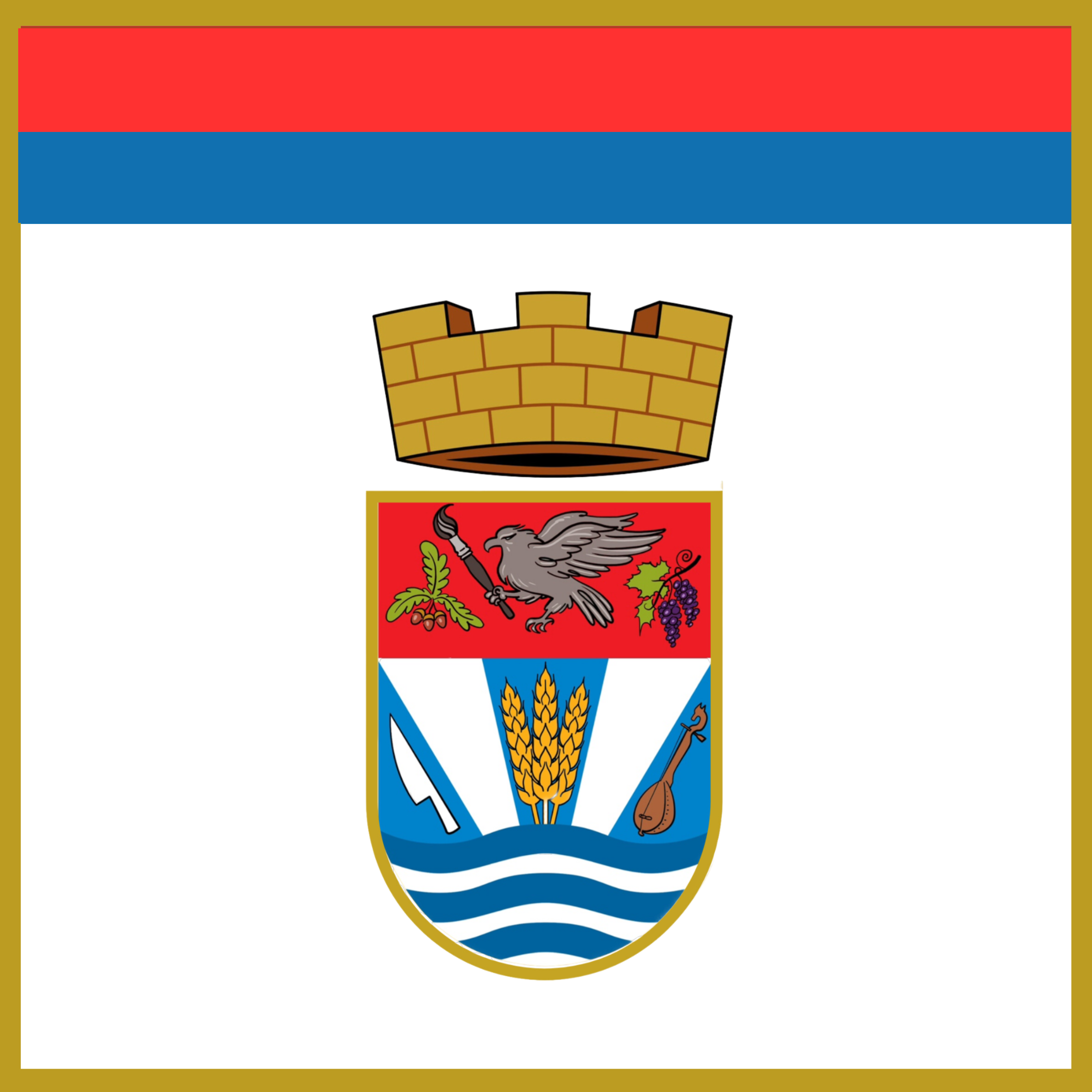
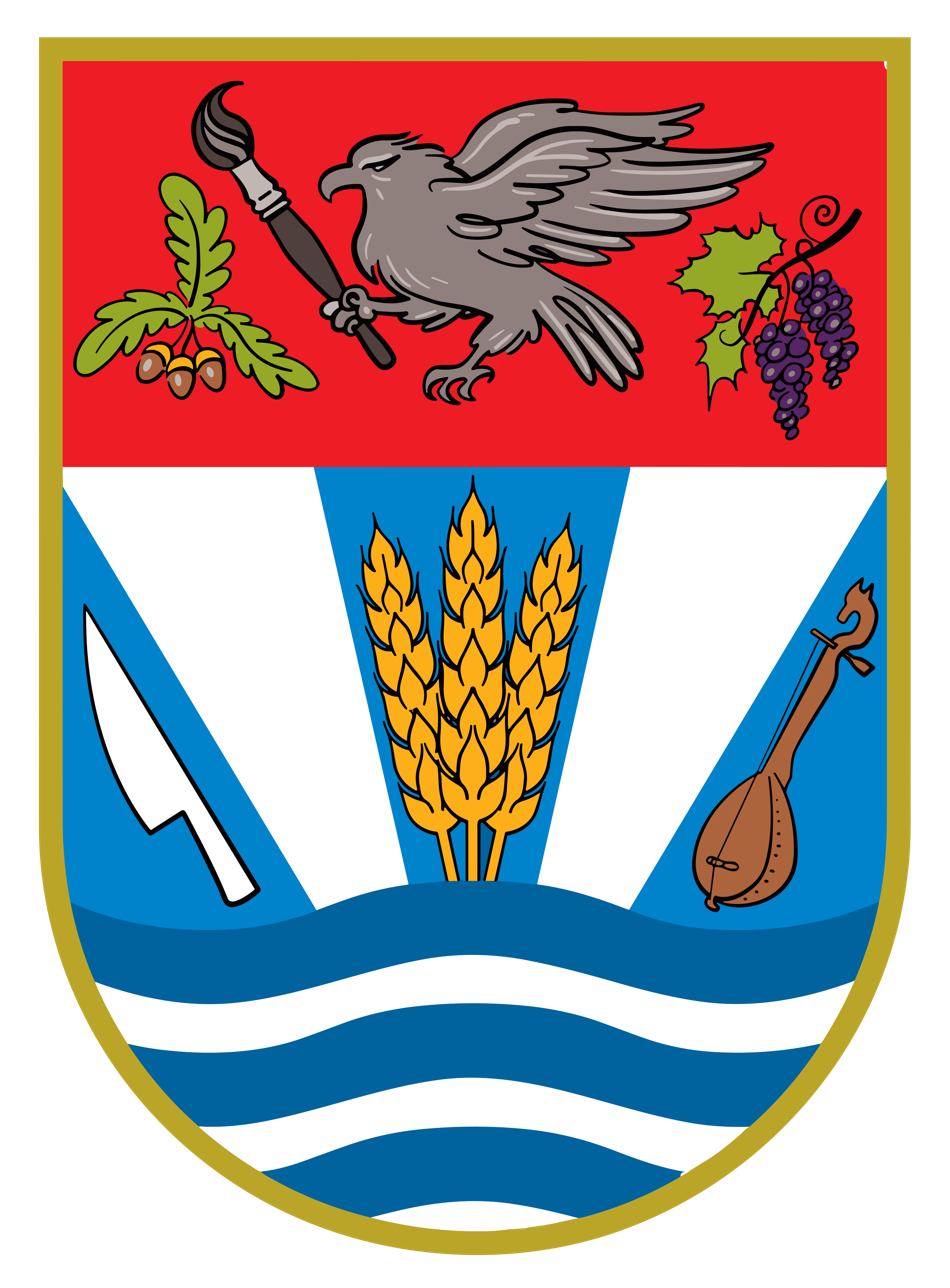
- Flag Coat of arms

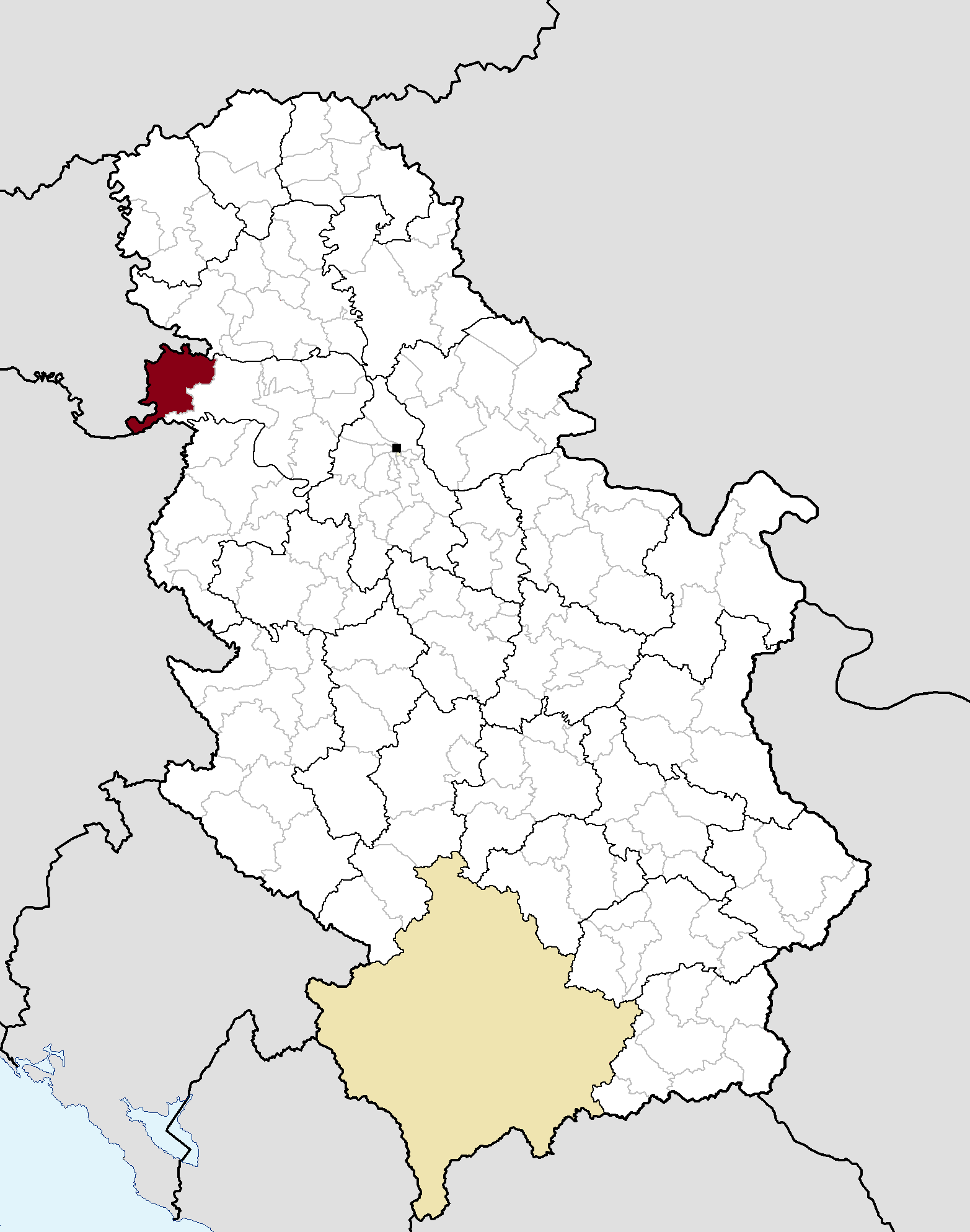
- Location of the municipality of Šid within Serbia

- Location in Serbia
- Coordinates: 45°07′N 19°14′E
- Country: Serbia
- Province: Vojvodina
- Region: Syrmia
- District: Srem
- Settlements: 19

Government
  - Mayor: Zoran Semenović (SNS)

Area
  - Town: 47.30 km^{2} (18.26 sq mi)
  - Municipality: 687.07 km^{2} (265.28 sq mi)
- Elevation: 98 m (322 ft)

Population (2022 census)
  - Town: 12,618
  - Town density: 266.8/km^{2} (690.9/sq mi)
  - Municipality: 27,894
  - Municipality density: 40.598/km^{2} (105.15/sq mi)
- Demonym(s): Šiđanin (♂) Šiđanka (♀) (per grammatical gender)
- Time zone: UTC+1 (CET)
  - Summer (DST): UTC+2 (CEST)
- Postal code: 22240
- Area code: +381(0)22
- Car plates: ŠI
- Official languages: Official language: Serbian; In official-use languages: Serbian, Slovak and Pannonian Rusyn in the entire municipality and Serbian and Croatian in Batrovci and Sot and language facilities in Ljuba
- Website: www.sid.rs

Šid (Serbian Cyrillic: Шид, pronounced [ʃîːd]; Hungarian: Sid) is a town and municipality located in the Srem District of the province of Vojvodina, Serbia. It has a population of 12,628, while the municipality has 27,894 inhabitants (2022 census). A border crossing between Serbia and Croatia is located in the town.

== Name ==
In Serbian, the town is known as Šid (Шид), in Hungarian as Sid, in German as Schid, in Slovak as Šíd, and in Rusyn as Шид.

== History ==
Šid was firstly mentioned in 1702. At first, settlement was part of Danubian Military Frontier, but since the middle of the 18th century, it was part of the Syrmia County of the Habsburg Kingdom of Slavonia. In 1848–1849, Šid was part of Serbian Vojvodina, and in 1849–1860 part of Voivodeship of Serbia and Banat of Temeschwar. After the abolishment of the voivodeship in 1860, Šid was again incorporated into Syrmia County of the Kingdom of Slavonia.

In 1868, Kingdom of Slavonia was joined with the Kingdom of Croatia into the Kingdom of Croatia-Slavonia, which was part of the Kingdom of Hungary and Austria-Hungary. Šid was a district center within Syrmia County. In 1910, ethnic Serbs were in absolute majority in the town, while other sizable ethnic groups included Rusyns, Slovaks and Croats.

In 1918, the town first became part of the State of Slovenes, Croats and Serbs, then part of the Kingdom of Serbia and finally part of the Kingdom of Serbs, Croats and Slovenes. From 1918 to 1922, Šid was part of the Syrmia county, from 1922 to 1929 part of the Syrmia oblast, from 1929 to 1931 part of the Drina Banovina, from 1931 to 1939 part of the Danube Banovina, and from 1939 to 1941 part of the Banovina of Croatia.

=== WWII ===
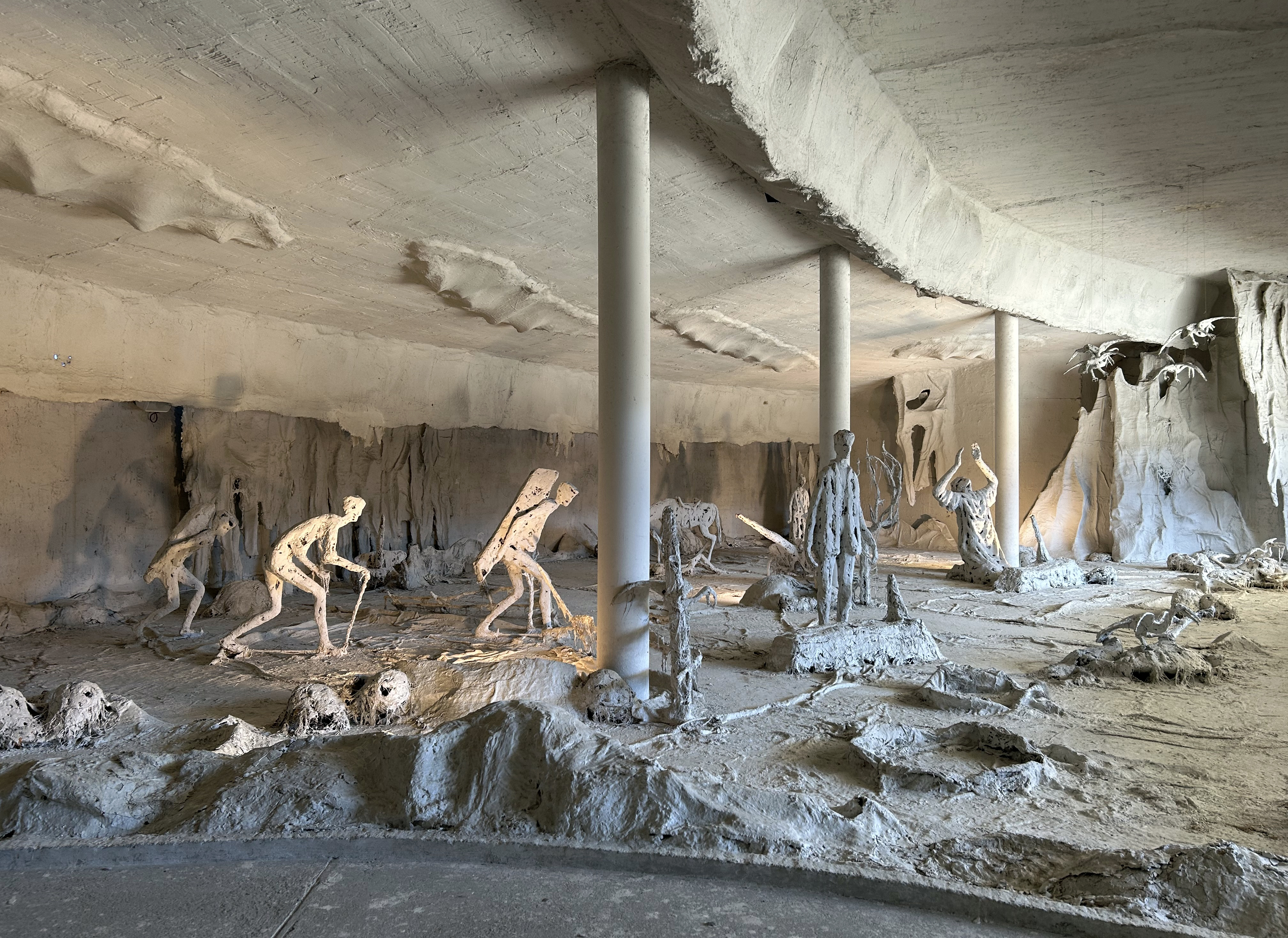
Syrmian Front memorial in Šid

During World War II, from 1941 to 1944, the town was occupied by Axis troops and was included into the Pavelić's Independent State of Croatia. The fascist Ustashe regime systematically murdered Serbs (as part of the Genocide of the Serbs), Jews (The Holocaust), Roma (The Porajmos), and some political dissidents. In August 1942, following the joint military anti-partisan operation in the Syrmia by the Ustashe and German Wehrmacht, it turned into a massacre by the Ustasha militia that left up to 7,000 Serbs dead.

Among those killed was the prominent painter Sava Šumanović, who was arrested along with 150 residents of Šid. In 1944, Šid was liberated by Yugoslav Partisans and until April 1945, a number of battles of the Syrmian Front campaign were fought near the town. The Yugoslav Partisans mined the local Catholic church during the offensive in late 1944.

Since 1944, the town is part of Vojvodina, which (from 1945) was an autonomous province of Serbia and Yugoslavia.

=== Modern period ===
On 5 November 1991, the newly formed Croatian Army launched 15 artillery rockets into the city, killing four people and wounding 12 in what became the first attack on Serbian soil during the Yugoslav Wars. In 2009, Šid was declared mine-free after demining actions to remove explosives dating from the conflict.

== Inhabited places ==
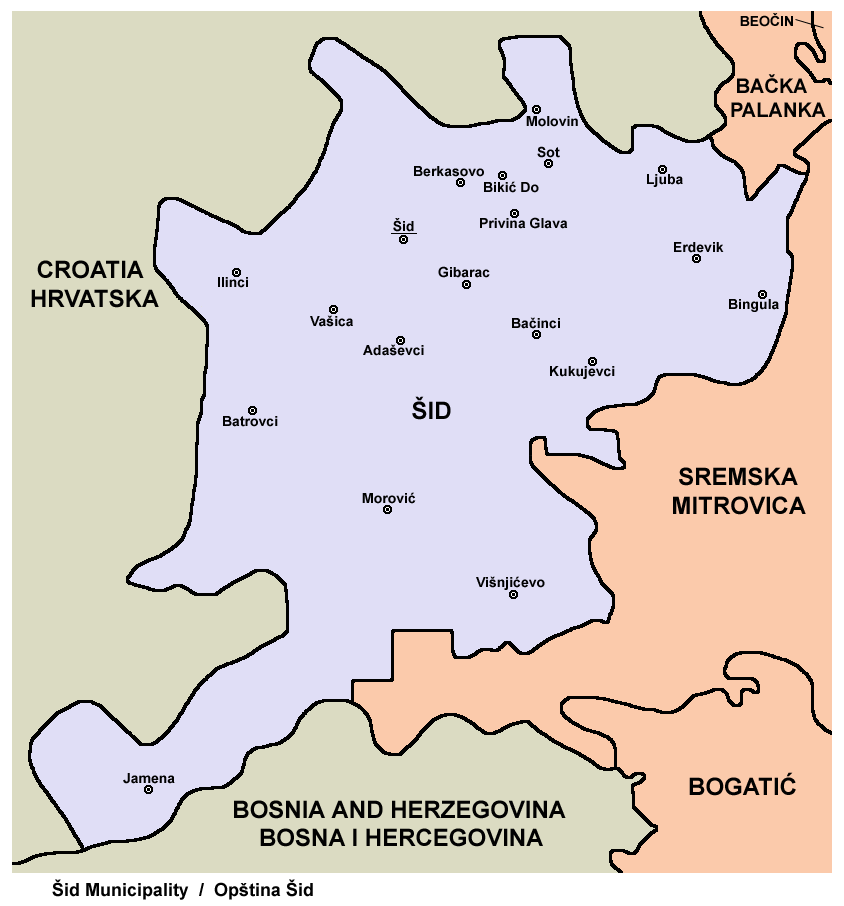
Map of Šid municipality

The municipality of Šid encompasses of town of Šid, and the following villages:

- Adaševci
- Batrovci
- Bačinci
- Berkasovo
- Bikić Do
- Bingula
- Vašica
- Višnjićevo
- Gibarac
- Erdevik
- Ilinci
- Jamena
- Kukujevci
- Ljuba
- Molovin
- Morović
- Privina Glava
- Sot

== Demographics ==
Historical population
Year	Pop.	±% p.a.
1948	32,518	—
1953	34,679	+1.30%
1961	37,430	+0.96%
1971	38,752	+0.35%
1981	37,459	−0.34%
1991	36,317	−0.31%
2002	38,973	+0.64%
2011	34,188	−1.44%
2022	27,894	−1.83%

According to the 2011 census results, the municipality of Šid had 34,188 inhabitants.

=== Ethnic groups ===
Most of the settlements in the municipality have an ethnic Serb majority. The settlement with Slovak ethnic majority is Ljuba. Ethnically mixed settlements are Bikić Do (with relative Rusyn majority) and Sot (with relative Serb majority).

The ethnic composition of the municipality:

Ethnic group	Population	%
Serbs	26,646	77.94%
Slovaks	2,136	6.25%
Croats	1,748	5.11%
Rusyns	1,027	3.00%
Roma	204	0.60%
Hungarians	179	0.52%
Yugoslavs	152	0.44%
Ukrainians	47	0.14%
Macedonians	26	0.08%
Montenegrins	26	0.08%
Muslims	24	0.07%
Russians	17	0.05%
Germans	14	0.04%
Albanians	10	0.03%
Romanians	3	0.01%
Others	1,929	5.65%
Total	34,188	

== Culture ==
Near the Privina Glava village is Privina Glava Monastery. According to the legend, the monastery was founded by the squire Priva in the 12th century.

A museum dedicated to an important Serbian artist Sava Šumanović, and a museum of naïve art "Ilijanum" consisting of more than 300 works of fine art, is located in the municipality.

== Economy ==
The following table gives a preview of total number of registered people employed in legal entities per their core activity (as of 2018):

Activity	Total
Agriculture, forestry and fishing	644
Mining and quarrying	-
Manufacturing	1,760
Electricity, gas, steam and air conditioning supply	18
Water supply; sewerage, waste management and remediation activities	195
Construction	104
Wholesale and retail trade, repair of motor vehicles and motorcycles	1,043
Transportation and storage	588
Accommodation and food services	181
Information and communication	129
Financial and insurance activities	118
Real estate activities	4
Professional, scientific and technical activities	282
Administrative and support service activities	89
Public administration and defense; compulsory social security	858
Education	502
Human health and social work activities	369
Arts, entertainment and recreation	90
Other service activities	101
Individual agricultural workers	508
Total	7,593

== Sports ==
Local football club Radnički 1910 spent one season in the second tier Serbian football under the name Big Bull Radnički.

== Twin towns – sister cities ==
There are three official sister cities of Šid:

- Genoa, Italy
- Andorra la Vella, Andorra
- Kitee, Finland

== Notable people ==
- Mira Banjac
- Željko Fajfrić
- Georgije Magarašević
- Grozdana Olujić
- Simeon Piščević
- Boško Simonović
- Milenka Subić
- Sava Šumanović

== See also ==
- Syrmia District
- Syrmia
- Šid railway station
