= Privina Glava Monastery =

Monastery in Serbia

Coordinates: 45°08′12″N 19°17′55″E

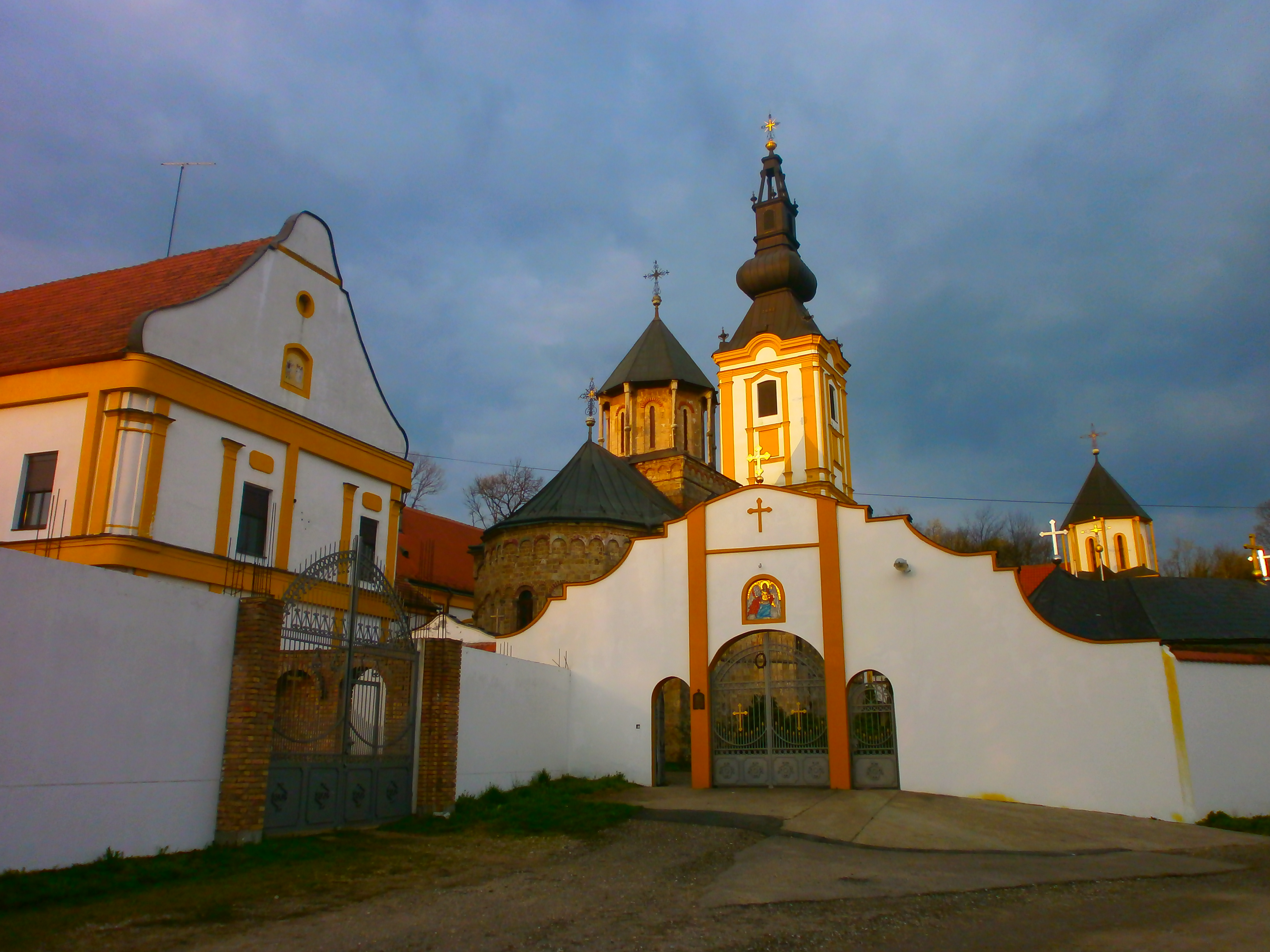
Privina Glava Monastery

The Privina Glava Monastery (Serbian: Манастир Привина Глава, romanized: Manastir Privina Glava) is a Serb Orthodox monastery on the Fruška Gora mountain in northern Serbia, in the province of Vojvodina. According to legend, Privina Glava was founded by a feudal lord whose name was Priba/Priva, in the 12th century while another attribution is the 15th century Srem despots of the Branković family. The earliest historical records about the monastery are dated in 1566/1567. The icons in the altar screen were painted by Andrej Šaltist in 1786, and the wall paintings by Kuzman Kolarić in 1791.

Prvina Glava Monastery was declared Monument of Culture of Exceptional Importance in 1990, and it is protected by the state.

== See also ==
- List of Serbian Orthodox monasteries
