= Ljuba, Šid =

Ljuba Љуба (Serbian) Ľuba (Slovak) Ljuba (Croatian)
- Village (Selo)
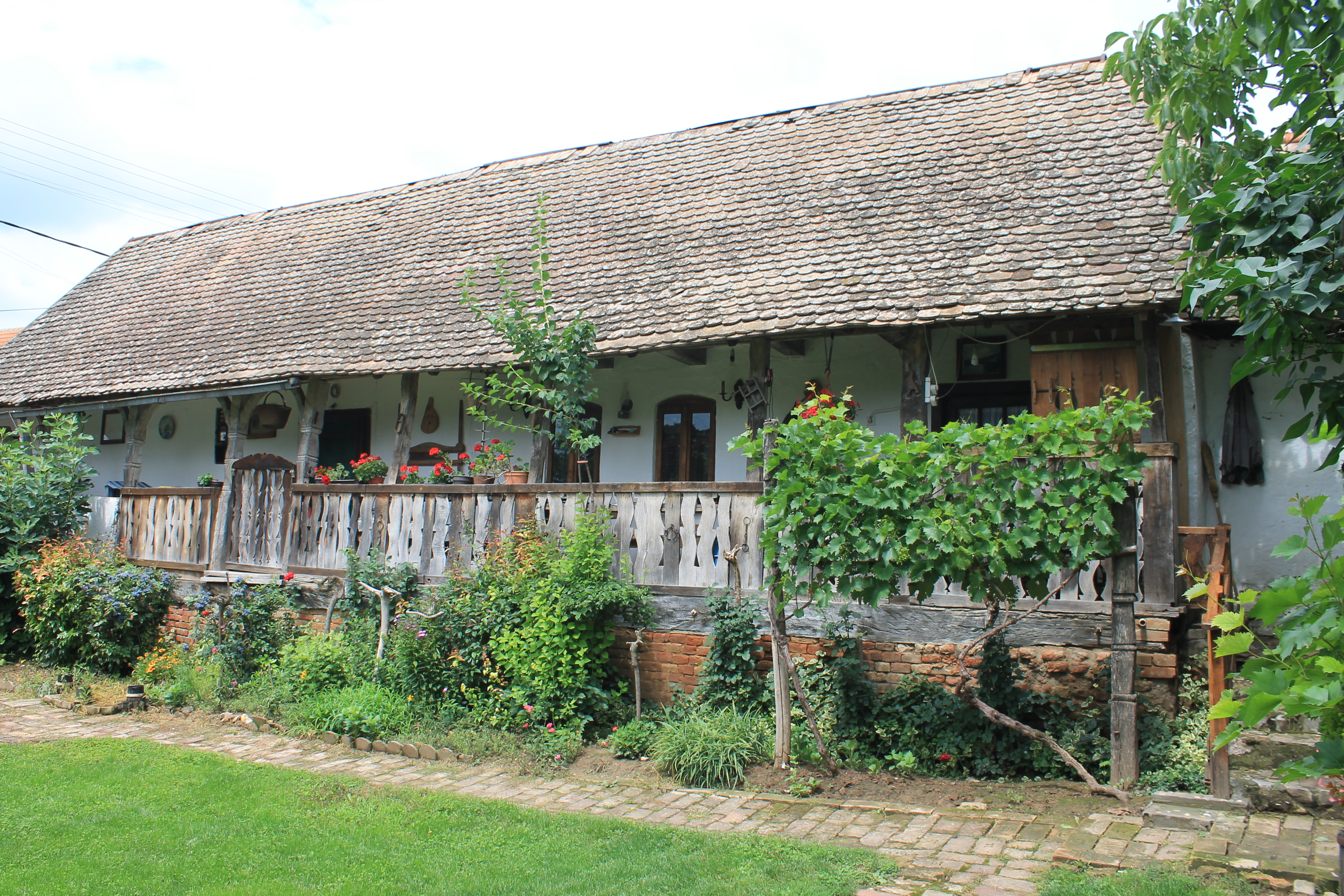
- Interactive map of Ljuba
- Location within Vojvodina Location within Serbia Location within Europe
- Coordinates: 45°09′N 19°23′E
- Country: Serbia
- Province: Vojvodina
- Region: Syrmia
- District: Srem
- Municipality: Šid

Population (2022)
  - Total: 361
- Time zone: UTC+1 (CET)
  - Summer (DST): UTC+2 (CEST)

Ljuba (Serbian Cyrillic: Љуба, Slovak: Ľuba) is a village located in the Šid municipality, Srem District, Vojvodina, Serbia. The village has a population of 361 people (2022 census).

== History ==
Following Ottoman retreat from the region, the Lordship of Ilok and Upper Syrmia was established, and the village became part of its domain.

== Demographics ==
=== Historical population ===
- 1961: 838
- 1971: 757
- 1981: 639
- 1991: 585
- 2002: 558
- 2022: 361

=== Ethnic groups ===
According to data from the 2022 census, ethnic groups in the village include:

- 186 (51.5%) Slovaks
- 86 (23.8%) Croats
- 75 (20.7%) Serbs
- Others/Undeclared/Unknown

== See also ==
- List of places in Serbia
- List of cities, towns and villages in Vojvodina
