= Privina Glava =

Privina Glava Привина Глава (Serbian)
- Village (Selo)
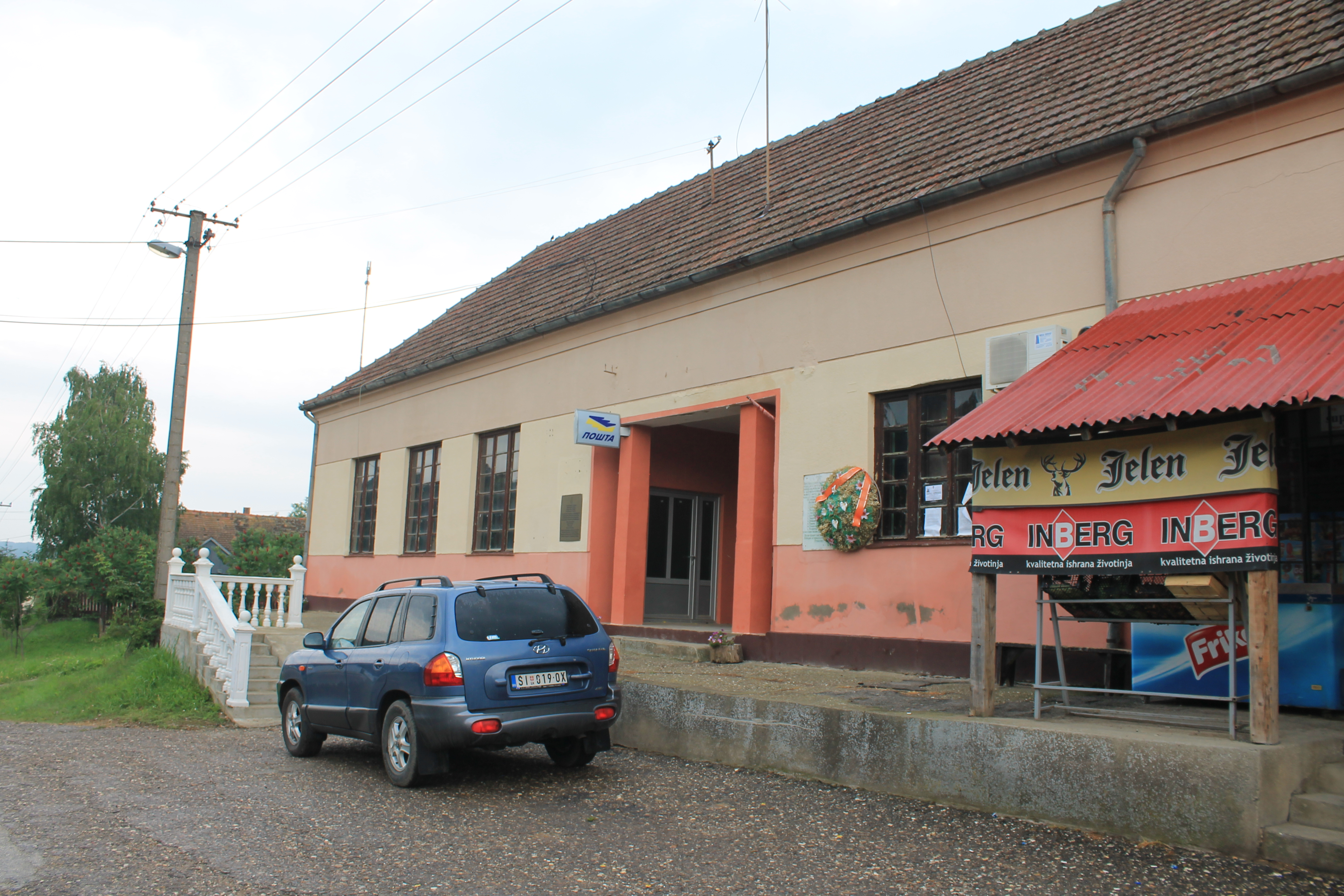

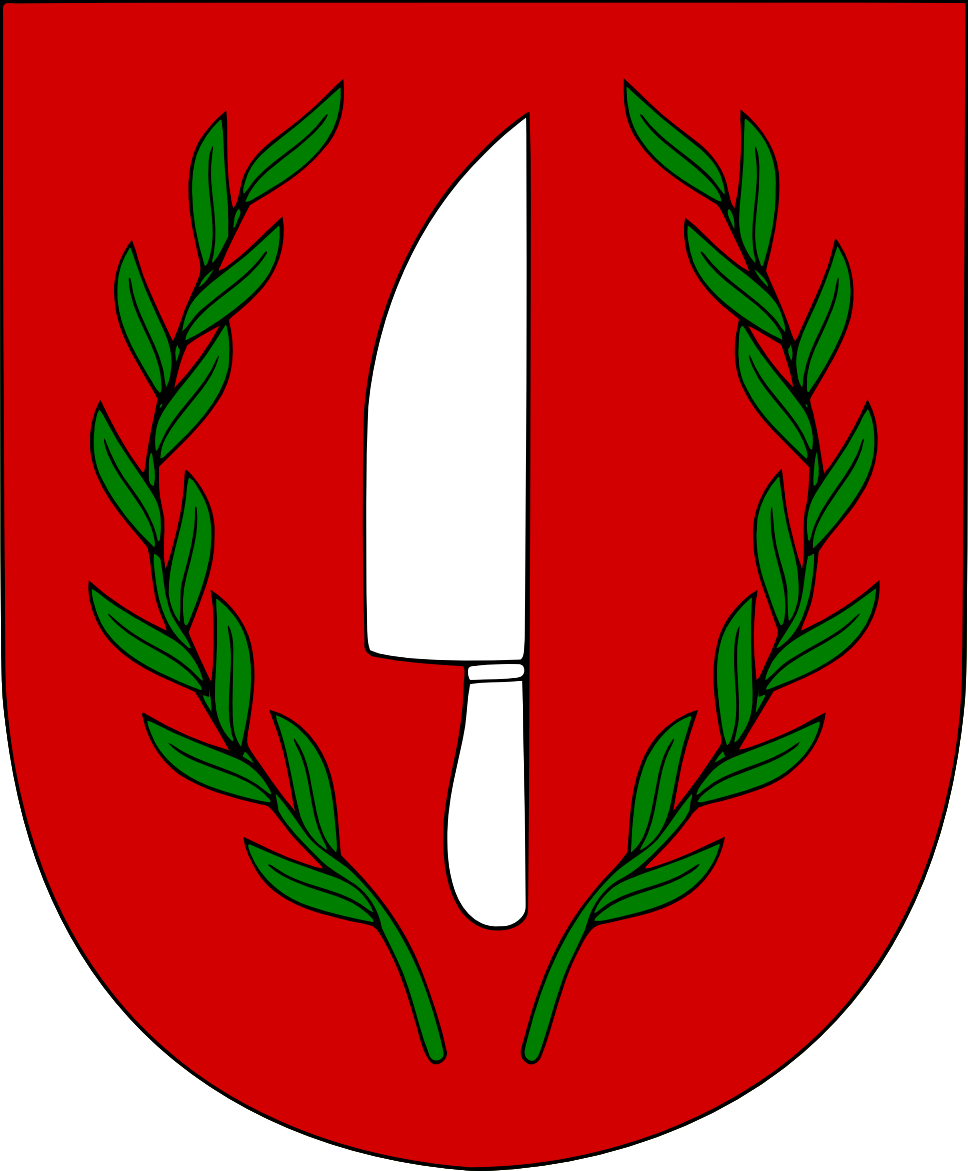
- Seal

- Location within Vojvodina Location within Serbia Location within Europe
- Coordinates: 45°08′29″N 19°17′42″E
- Country: Serbia
- Province: Vojvodina
- Region: Syrmia
- District: Srem
- Municipality: Šid

Population (2002)
  - Total: 221
- Time zone: UTC+1 (CET)
  - Summer (DST): UTC+2 (CEST)

Privina Glava (Serbian: Привина Глава) is a village in Serbia. It is situated in the Šid municipality, in the Srem District, Vojvodina province. The village has a Serb ethnic majority and its population numbering 221 people (2002 census).

== See also ==
- List of places in Serbia
- List of cities, towns and villages in Vojvodina
