= Sot, Šid =

Sot Сот (Serbian) Sot (Slovak) Сот (Pannonian Rusyn) Sot (Croatian)
- Village (Selo)
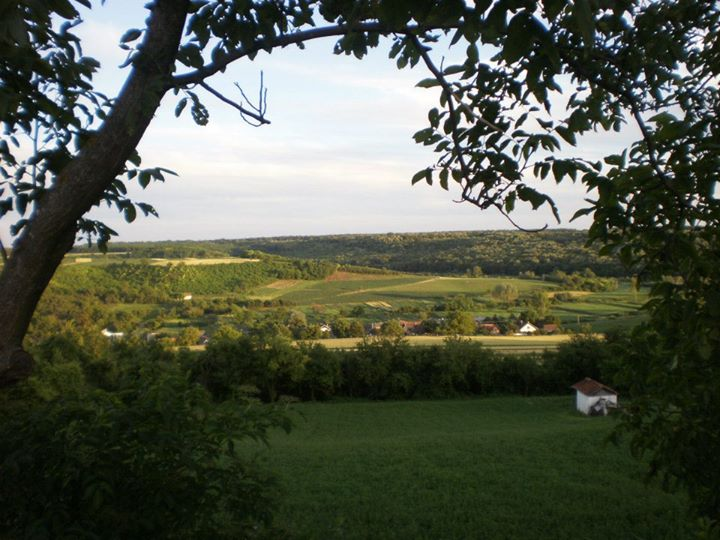
- Interactive map of Sot
- Location within Vojvodina Location within Serbia Location within Europe
- Coordinates: 45°10′N 19°19′E
- Country: Serbia
- Province: Vojvodina
- Region: Syrmia
- District: Srem
- Municipality: Šid

Population (2002)
  - Total: 791
- Time zone: UTC+1 (CET)
  - Summer (DST): UTC+2 (CEST)

Sot (Serbian Cyrillic: Сот) is a village located in Syrmia, Vojvodina, Serbia. It is situated in the Šid municipality, in the Syrmia District. The village is ethnically mixed and its population numbering 791 people (2002 census).

== History ==
Following Ottoman retreat from the region, the Lordship of Ilok and Upper Syrmia was established, and the village became part of its domain.

== Ethnic groups (2002 census) ==
The population of the village include:

- 340 (42.98%) Serbs
- 317 (40.08%) Croats
- 33 (4.17%) Hungarians
- 28 (3.54%) Slovaks
- 15 (1.90%) Yugoslavs
- others.

== Historical population ==
- 1931: 1,949
- 1961: 1,272
- 1971: 1,077
- 1981: 900
- 1991: 819
- 2002: 791

== See also ==
- St Catherine Church, Sot
- List of places in Serbia
- List of cities, towns and villages in Vojvodina
