= State Road 126 (Serbia) =

Road in Serbia

State Road 126
- Serbian: Državni put II reda 126; Serbian Cyrillic: Државни пут II реда 126
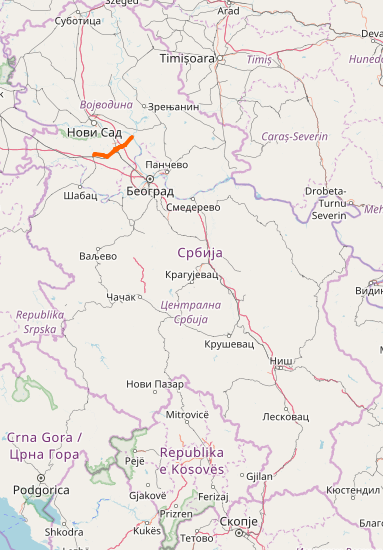

Route information
- Maintained by JP "Putevi Srbije"
- Length: 40.283 km (25.031 mi)

Major junctions
- From: Ruma
- To: Stari Slankamen

Location
- Country: Serbia
- Districts: Srem

Highway system
- Roads in Serbia; Motorways
← 125	→ 127

State Road 126, is an IIA-class road in northern Serbia, connecting Ruma with Stari Slankamen. It is located in Vojvodina.

Before the new road categorization regulation given in 2013, the route wore the following names: P 106, P 109 and M 22.1 (before 2012) / 119, 124 and 102 (after 2012).

The existing route is a regional road with two traffic lanes. By the valid Space Plan of Republic of Serbia the road is not planned for upgrading to main road, and is expected to be conditioned in its current state.

== Sections ==
Section number	Length	Distance	Section name
12601	10.938 km (6.797 mi)	10.938 km (6.797 mi)	Ruma (Putinci) – Putinci
12602	10.006 km (6.217 mi)	20.944 km (13.014 mi)	Putinci – Inđija (Putinci)
10021	0.421 km (0.262 mi)	21.365 km (13.276 mi)	Inđija (Putinci) – Inđija (Novi Karlovci) (overlap with)
12603	6.313 km (3.923 mi)	27.678 km (17.198 mi)	Inđija (Novi Karlovci) – Inđija (link with)
12604	12.605 km (7.832 mi)	40.283 km (25.031 mi)	Inđija (link with) – Stari Slankamen

== See also ==
- Roads in Serbia
