= State Road 127 (Serbia) =

Road in Serbia

State Road 127
- Serbian: Državni put II reda 127; Serbian Cyrillic: Државни пут II реда 127
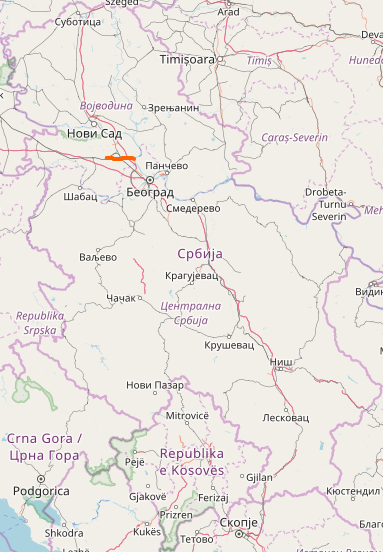

Route information
- Maintained by JP "Putevi Srbije"
- Length: 23.885 km (14.841 mi)

Major junctions
- From: Putinci
- To: Stari Banovci

Location
- Country: Serbia
- Districts: Srem

Highway system
- Roads in Serbia; Motorways
← 126	→ 128

State Road 127, is an IIA-class road in northern Serbia, connecting Putinci with Stari Banovci. It is located in Vojvodina.

Before the new road categorization regulation given in 2013, the route wore the following names: P 106 (before 2012) / 119 (after 2012).

The existing route is a regional road with two traffic lanes. By the valid Space Plan of Republic of Serbia the road is not planned for upgrading to main road, and is expected to be conditioned in its current state.

== Sections ==
Section number	Length	Distance	Section name
12701	6.690 km (4.157 mi)	6.690 km (4.157 mi)	Putinci – Golubinci
12702	7.448 km (4.628 mi)	14.138 km (8.785 mi)	Golubinci – Stara Pazova (centre)
12703	4.463 km (2.773 mi)	18.601 km (11.558 mi)	Stara Pazova (centre) – Stara Pazova interchange
12704	5.284 km (3.283 mi)	23.885 km (14.841 mi)	Stara Pazova interchange – Stari Banovci

== See also ==
- Roads in Serbia
