= Bekrić =

Bekrić is a Bosnian surname. Notable people with the surname include:

- Emir Bekrić (born 1991), Serbian hurdler
- Liam Bekric (born 2001), Australian paralympic swimmer
- Samir Bekrić (born 1985), Bosnian footballer

== See also ==
- Berić
