= State Road 125 (Serbia) =

Road in Serbia

State Road 125
- Serbian: Državni put II reda 125; Serbian Cyrillic: Државни пут II реда 125
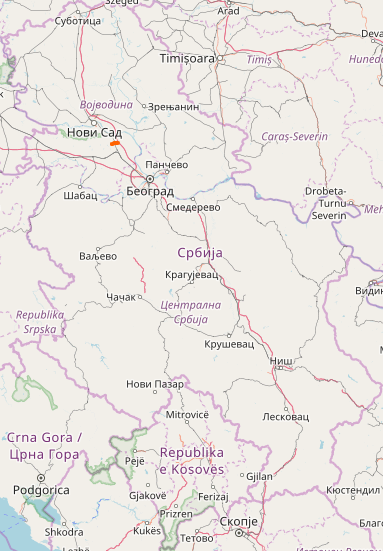

Route information
- Maintained by JP "Putevi Srbije"
- Length: 5.833 km (3.624 mi)

Major junctions
- From: Maradik interchange
- To: Maradik

Location
- Country: Serbia
- Districts: Srem

Highway system
- Roads in Serbia; Motorways
← 124	→ 126

State Road 125, is an IIA-class road in northern Serbia, connecting Maradik interchange with the village itself. It is located in Vojvodina.

Before the new road categorization regulation given in 2013, the route wore the following name: M 22.2 (before 2012).

The existing route is a local road with two traffic lanes. By the valid Space Plan of Republic of Serbia the road is not planned for upgrading to motorway or expressway, and is expected to be conditioned in its current state.

== Sections ==
Section number	Length	Distance	Section name
12501	5.833 km (3.624 mi)	5.833 km (3.624 mi)	Maradik interchange – Maradik (link with)

== See also ==
- Roads in Serbia
