= 2004–05 Red Star Belgrade season =

Red Star Belgrade
2004–05 season
- Chairman: Dragan Džajić
- Manager: Ljupko Petrović (until 17 September); Milovan Rajevac (caretaker); Ratko Dostanić (from 25 September)
- First League of Serbia and Montenegro: 2nd
- Serbia and Montenegro Cup: Runners-up
- UEFA Champions League: Third qualifying round
- UEFA Cup: First round
- Top goalscorer: League: Marko Pantelić (21); All: Marko Pantelić (24)

During the 2004–05 season, Red Star Belgrade participated in the 2004–05 First League of Serbia and Montenegro, 2004–05 Serbia and Montenegro Cup, 2004–05 UEFA Champions League qualifying rounds and 2004–05 UEFA Cup.

== International Football Tournament in Leipzig (IFiZ) ==
16 July 2004	Red Star Belgrade (Serbia and Montenegro)	3–1	(Belgium) Club Brugge	Zentralstadion, Leipzig
	Basta 21'; Perović 52'; Milovanović 78'		Stoica 54'	Attendance: 5,000; Referee: Bibiana Steinhaus

17 July 2004	Werder Bremen (Germany)	2–2 (4–5 p)	(Serbia and Montenegro) Red Star Belgrade	Zentralstadion, Leipzig
	Klose 21', 28'		Pantelić 16', 39'	Attendance: 5,000; Referee: Olaf Blumenstein
	Penalties
	Fahrenhorst (penalty scored); Magnin (penalty missed); Schulz (penalty scored); Ismaël (penalty scored); Borowski (penalty scored)		(penalty scored) Luković; (penalty scored) Stojanović; (penalty scored) Đorđević; (penalty scored) Miladinović; (penalty scored) Pantelić

== Squad ==
Name	First League of Serbia and Montenegro		Serbia and Montenegro Cup		UEFA Champions League		UEFA Cup		Total	
Name	Apps	Goals	Apps	Goals	Apps	Goals	Apps	Goals	Apps	Goals
Goalkeepers
(Serbia and Montenegro) Ivan Ranđelović	20	0	4	0	0	0	0	0	24	0
(Serbia and Montenegro) Zoran Banović	5	0	1	0	0	0	0	0	6	0
Defenders
(Serbia and Montenegro) Aleksandar Luković	25	0	5	0	3	0	2	0	35	0
(Serbia and Montenegro) Milan Dudić	23	1	4	0	4	2	2	0	33	3
(Serbia and Montenegro) Milan Biševac	24	1	4	0	4	0	1	0	33	1
(Serbia and Montenegro) Dušan Basta	23	2	1	0	4	0	1	0	29	2
(Serbia and Montenegro) Slavoljub Đorđević	20	0	5	0	2	0	2	0	29	0
(Serbia and Montenegro) Marjan Marković	12	1	3	0	0	0	2	0	17	1
(Serbia and Montenegro) Bojan Miladinović	4	0	1	0	4	1	2	0	11	1
(Serbia and Montenegro) Dragan Šarac	8	0	0	0	0	0	1	0	9	0
(Serbia and Montenegro) Nebojša Joksimović	3	0	1	0	0	0	0	0	4	0
(Serbia and Montenegro) Nikola Beljić	1	0	0	0	0	0	0	0	1	0
Midfielders
(Serbia and Montenegro) Boško Janković	28	9	4	1	4	1	2	0	38	11
(Serbia and Montenegro) Marko Perović	23	3	4	0	4	0	2	0	33	3
(Serbia and Montenegro) Radovan Krivokapić	24	6	4	1	2	0	1	0	31	7
(Serbia and Montenegro) Nenad Kovačević	22	0	3	0	0	0	2	0	27	0
(Serbia and Montenegro) Dejan Milovanović	18	0	3	0	3	0	1	0	25	0
(Serbia and Montenegro) Vladimir Mudrinić	17	1	4	0	0	0	0	0	21	1
(Serbia and Montenegro) Ardian Đokaj	14	2	2	0	0	0	0	0	16	2
(Serbia and Montenegro) Vladimir Tintor	7	0	0	0	4	0	0	0	11	0
(Serbia and Montenegro) Dragan Stančić	6	0	0	0	3	0	0	0	9	0
Forwards
(Serbia and Montenegro) Marko Pantelić	29	21	5	1	4	1	2	1	40	24
(Serbia and Montenegro) Nikola Žigić	25	15	3	2	3	3	2	0	33	20
(Serbia and Montenegro) Dragan Bogavac	15	0	4	2	0	0	0	0	19	2
(Serbia and Montenegro) Dragan Mrđa	7	0	1	0	0	0	0	0	8	0
Players sold or loaned out during the season
(Serbia and Montenegro) Miroslav Lečić	1	0	0	0	0	0	0	0	1	0
(Serbia and Montenegro) Nenad Stojanović	8	2	2	0	1	0	1	0	12	2
(Serbia and Montenegro) Vladimir Dišljenković	6	0	1	0	4	0	2	0	13	0
(North Macedonia) Goran Popov	0	0	0	0	3	0	0	0	3	0

== Results ==
=== Overview ===
Competition	Record							
Competition	P	W	D	L	GF	GA	GD	Win %
First League of Serbia and Montenegro	30	23	5	2	66	18	+48	76.67
Serbia and Montenegro Cup	5	4	0	1	7	2	+5	80.00
UEFA Champions League	4	2	1	1	8	9	−1	50.00
UEFA Cup	2	0	0	2	1	6	−5	0.00
Total	41	29	6	6	82	35	+47	70.73

=== First League of Serbia and Montenegro ===
Pos	Team	Pld	W	D	L	GF	GA	GD	Pts	Qualification or relegation
1	Partizan (C)	30	25	5	0	81	20	+61	80	Qualification for Champions League second qualifying round
2	Red Star Belgrade	30	23	5	2	66	18	+48	74	Qualification for UEFA Cup second qualifying round
3	Zeta	30	18	5	7	52	30	+22	59	Qualification for UEFA Cup second qualifying round
4	OFK Beograd	30	16	2	12	51	36	+15	50	Qualification for UEFA Cup second qualifying round
5	Zemun	30	12	7	11	31	34	−3	43	Ineligible for 2005–06 European competitions

Source: RSSSF.org
Rules for classification: 1) points; 2) goal difference; 3) number of goals scored.
(C) Champions

Date	Opponent	Venue	Result	Scorers
7 August 2004	Borac Čačak	H	0–1	
29 August 2004	Zemun	H	1–0	Pantelić
11 September 2004	Zeta	A	1–1	Krivokapić
19 September 2004	Hajduk Beograd	H	5–0	Perović, Pantelić, Dudić, Janković, Stojanović
22 September 2004	OFK Beograd	H	4–2	Pantelić, Janković (2), Basta
25 September 2004	Čukarički	A	1–0	Pantelić
3 October 2004	Sutjeska Nikšić	H	3–0	Krivokapić, Pantelić, Žigić
16 October 2004	Partizan	A	0–0	
23 October 2004	Hajduk Kula	H	2–1	Pantelić (2)
30 October 2004	Smederevo	A	2–0	Žigić, Krivokapić
3 November 2004	Vojvodina	A	3–1	Marković, Perović, Žigić
6 November 2004	Radnički Beograd	H	4–0	Pantelić (3), Stojanović
21 November 2004	Budućnost Podgorica	A	3–1	Žigić, Pantelić, Krivokapić
27 November 2004	Obilić	H	4–1	Žigić (3), Pantelić
4 December 2004	Železnik	A	5–3	Žigić (2), Lomić (o.g.), Pantelić, Krivokapić
26 February 2005	Borac Čačak	A	2–0	Janković, Pantelić
12 March 2005	Vojvodina	H	3–0	Biševac, Žigić (2)
19 March 2005	Zemun	A	0–0	
23 March 2005	OFK Beograd	A	1–0	Janković
2 April 2005	Zeta	H	2–1	Pantelić (2)
9 April 2005	Hajduk Beograd	A	4–0	Janković, Basta, Pantelić (2)
16 April 2005	Čukarički	H	5–0	Pantelić (pen.), Žigić (2), Janković, Đokaj
20 April 2005	Sutjeska Nikšić	A	2–1	Mudrinić, Dubljević (o.g.)
23 April 2005	Partizan	H	1–1	Pantelić
30 April 2005	Hajduk Kula	A	1–0	Krivokapić
4 May 2005	Smederevo	H	1–1	Đokaj
7 May 2005	Radnički Beograd	A	1–0	Žigić
14 May 2005	Budućnost Podgorica	H	1–2	Janković
21 May 2005	Obilić	A	1–0	Pantelić
28 May 2005	Železnik	H	3–1	Janković, Perović, Žigić

=== Serbia and Montenegro Cup ===
Date	Opponent	Venue	Result	Scorers
20 October 2004	Mladost Apatin	A	1–0	Žigić
27 October 2004	Javor	H	2–0	Pantelić, Janković
10 November 2004	Smederevo	H	2–1	Bogavac (2)
11 May 2005	Partizan	H	2–0	Žigić, Krivokapić
24 May 2005	Železnik	N	0–1	

=== UEFA Champions League ===
==== Second qualifying round ====
28 July 2004	Young Boys (Switzerland)	2–2	(Serbia and Montenegro) Red Star Belgrade	Hardturm, Zürich
	Chapuisat 6'; Eugster 65'	Report	Žigić 79', 88'	Attendance: 10,350; Referee: Pieter Vink (Netherlands)

4 August 2004	Red Star Belgrade (Serbia and Montenegro)	3–0 (5–2 agg.)	(Switzerland) Young Boys	Red Star Stadium, Belgrade
	Miladinović 39'; Dudić 49'; Žigić 69'	Report		Attendance: 40,000; Referee: Damien Ledentu (France)

==== Third qualifying round ====
11 August 2004	Red Star Belgrade (Serbia and Montenegro)	3–2	(Netherlands) PSV Eindhoven	Red Star Stadium, Belgrade
	Dudić 20'; Janković 39'; Pantelić 59'	Report	Park Ji-sung 8' de Jong 65'	Attendance: 50,000; Referee: Pierluigi Collina (Italy)

25 August 2004	PSV Eindhoven (Netherlands)	5–0 (7–3 agg.)	(Serbia and Montenegro) Red Star Belgrade	Philips Stadion, Eindhoven
	van Bommel 9' (pen.), 56'; Beasley 32' de Jong 57'; Vennegoor of Hesselink 80'	Report		Attendance: 25,000; Referee: Valentin Ivanov (Russia)

=== UEFA Cup ===
==== First round ====
16 September 2004	Zenit Saint Petersburg (Russia)	4–0	(Serbia and Montenegro) Red Star Belgrade	Petrovsky Stadium, Saint Petersburg
	Arshavin 26', 43'; Horshkov 32'; Kerzhakov 53'	Report		Attendance: 22,000; Referee: Peter Fröjdfeldt (Sweden)

30 September 2004	Red Star Belgrade (Serbia and Montenegro)	1–2 (1–6 agg.)	(Russia) Zenit Saint Petersburg	Red Star Stadium, Belgrade
	Pantelić 17'	Report	Spivak 58' (pen.); Makarov 84'	Attendance: 15,000; Referee: Michael Weiner (Germany)

== See also ==
- List of Red Star Belgrade seasons
