= State Road 128 (Serbia) =

Road in Serbia

State Road 128
- Serbian: Državni put II reda 128; Serbian Cyrillic: Државни пут II реда 128
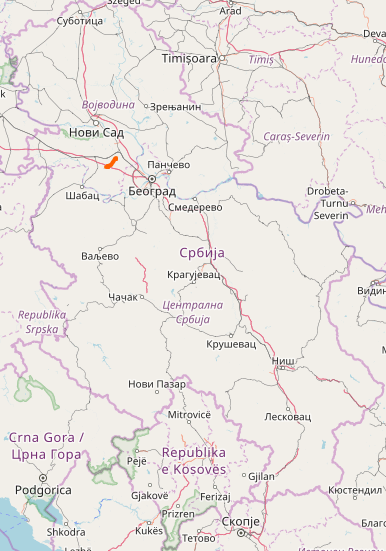

Route information
- Maintained by JP "Putevi Srbije"
- Length: 13.948 km (8.667 mi)

Major junctions
- From: Golubinci
- To: Pećinci

Location
- Country: Serbia
- Districts: Srem

Highway system
- Roads in Serbia; Motorways
← 127	→ 129

State Road 128 is an IIA-class road in northern Serbia, located in Vojvodina, connecting Golubinci with Pećinci.

Before the new road categorization regulation given in 2013, the route wore the following name: P 121 (before 2012).

The existing route is a regional road with two traffic lanes. By the valid Space Plan of Republic of Serbia the road is not planned for upgrading to main road, and is expected to be conditioned in its current state.

== Sections ==
Section number	km	mi	Section name
12801	13.948	8.667	Golubinci – Pećinci (Subotište)

== See also ==
- Roads in Serbia
