= Goran Savić =

- Горан Савић

Director of the Government Fund of Vojvodina
- Incumbent
- Assumed office 2016

Member of the Assembly of Vojvodina
- In office 2016 – 22 July 2016

Personal details
- Born: 1971 (age 54–55) Golubinci, Stara Pazova, Serbia
- Party: Serbian Progressive Party

Goran Savić (Serbian Cyrillic: Горан Савић; born 1971) is a politician and administrator in Serbia. He briefly served in the Assembly of Vojvodina in 2016 as a member of the Serbian Progressive Party. Since 2016, he has been the director of the Government Fund of Vojvodina.

== Private career ==
Savić is a graduated economist. He is from Golubinci in the municipality of Stara Pazova.

== Politician ==
Savić has been vice-president of the Progressive Party's municipal board in Stara Pazova.

He received the thirty-fourth position on the Progressive Party's Let's Get Vojvodina Moving electoral list in the 2012 Vojvodina provincial election. The list won only fourteen mandates, and he was not elected. He later served as assistant to the mayor of Stara Pazova with responsibility for economic development and strategic marketing.

Savić was given the fifty-sixth position on the Progressive-led list in the 2016 provincial election and was elected when the list won a majority victory with sixty-three out of 120 mandates. He was appointed to the assembly committee on national equality, the committee for education and science, and the committee on petitions and proposals.

His term in the assembly was, however, very brief. He resigned on 22 July 2016, having been appointed as director of the Government Fund of Vojvodina.

Savić is still the director of the fund as of 2021.
