= State Road 123 (Serbia) =

Road in Serbia

State Road 123
- Serbian: Državni put II reda 123; Serbian Cyrillic: Државни пут II реда 123
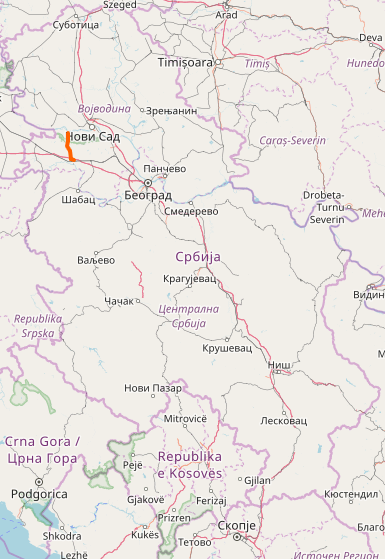

Route information
- Maintained by JP "Putevi Srbije"
- Length: 28.874 km (17.941 mi)

Major junctions
- From: Sviloš
- To: Sremska Mitrovica

Location
- Country: Serbia
- Districts: South Bačka, Srem

Highway system
- Roads in Serbia; Motorways
← 122	→ 124

State Road 123, is an IIA-class road in northern Serbia, connecting Sviloš with Sremska Mitrovica. It is located in Vojvodina.

Before the new road categorization regulation given in 2013, the route wore the following names: P 116 (before 2012) / 125 (after 2012).

The existing route is a regional road with two traffic lanes. By the valid Space Plan of Republic of Serbia the road is not planned for upgrading to main road, and is expected to be conditioned in its current state.

== Sections ==
Section number	Length	Distance	Section name
12301	18.387 km (11.425 mi)	18.387 km (11.425 mi)	Sviloš (Danube) – Manđelos
12302	10.487 km (6.516 mi)	28.874 km (17.941 mi)	Manđelos – Sremska Mitrovica (link with)

== See also ==
- Roads in Serbia
