= Dejan Berić =

Serbian mercenary in the Russian separarist regions of Ukraine (born 1974)

- Дејан Берић
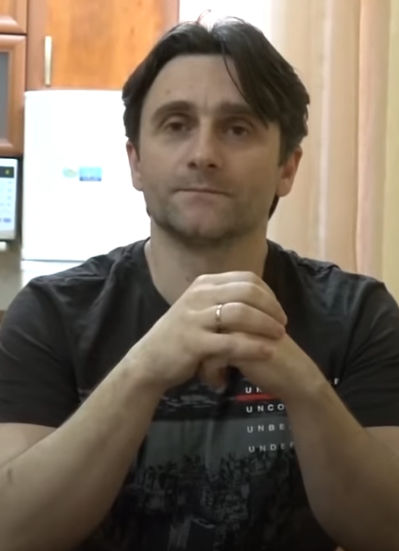
- Berić in 2019
- Born: 25 September 1974 (age 52); Putinci, SFR Yugoslavia
- Military career
- Allegiance: Russia (2014); Donetsk People's Republic
- Branch: DPR People's Militia; 51st Guards Army
- Service years: 2014–present
- Rank: Major
- Nickname: Deki
- Conflicts: Bosnian War; Kosovo War; Annexation of Crimea; War in Donbas
- Awards: Medal "For the Return of Crimea"

Dejan Berić (Serbian Cyrillic: Дејан Берић, Russian: Деян Берич; born 25 September 1974), simply known as Deki (Деки) is a Serbian volunteer in the forces of the Donetsk People's Republic with the rank of Major, who is fighting as a sniper in the ongoing Russo-Ukrainian War.

== Biography ==
=== Early life and business career ===
Berić was born on 25 September 1974 in the village of Putinci in Serbia. Until 2013, Berić owned a carpentry company, which operated for a few years. Allegedly, after it accrued heavy debts, Berić fired the workers and suddenly left the village. His wife and son live in Putinci and support themselves from his mother's pension. His father died a few years earlier in Russia, on the construction site where he worked.

=== Crimea and the war in Donbas ===
Prior to the 2014 Winter Olympics, Berić worked in Sochi on constructing the Olympic Village. Following the Olympics, Berić was recruited by Russian special services, left for Crimea and participated in its subsequent annexation by Russia. For this he was awarded the For the Return of Crimea medal.

After the war in Donbas started, Berić travelled to Ukraine through Sevastopol and joined the forces of the self-proclaimed Donetsk People's Republic as a sniper. According to the Ukrainian government, Berić was a mercenary leader of a sniper squad that has sought to kill members of the Armed Forces of Ukraine at the line of separation. Berić received several decorations from the Donetsk People's Republic for his war merits, such as for killing Ukrainian snipers and shooting down spy drones. He was captured in July 2014 on the road between Lugansk and the Russian-Ukrainian border. His freedom was paid for, so he continued to fight. It was reported that he was wounded in combat in 2018.

The national intelligence agency of Serbia included Berić on the list of war mercenaries and considers him a threat to Serbia's national security, and in accordance with the Serbian laws, Berić could receive a multi-year prison sentence if he returns or if he is arrested and extradited to Serbia.

Berić has appeared in pro-Russian media, inviting young people to join him. After the ceasefire in Donbas, Berić has been away from the front lines and has been increasingly present in the Russian media, including the mainstream media. He is usually presented to the Russian public as a hero and the most highly decorated fighter. He most often comments on the situation in eastern Ukraine and Kosovo, calling the OSCE and the Red Cross spies and NATO a terrorist organization. Berić was present at a press conference by Russian Foreign Ministry spokeswoman Maria Zakharova in Moscow. Berić asked her questions about the conflict in eastern Ukraine and Russia's position on Kosovo.

In March 2021, Berić announced that he is returning to the front lines due to the increased tensions between Ukraine and Russia.

Inspired by his war experiences, he wrote the book "When the Dead Speak", and a documentary film by Olya Schechter, called "A Sniper's War" was filmed about him.

=== 2022 Russian invasion of Ukraine ===
After Russia started its full-scale invasion of Ukraine, Berić was reportedly assigned the task of recruiting new Serbian fighters. In December 2022, Berić met with, and interviewed, alleged newly arrived Serbian volunteers.
