= State Road 122 (Serbia) =

Road in Serbia

State Road 122
- Serbian: Državni put II reda 122; Serbian Cyrillic: Државни пут II реда 122
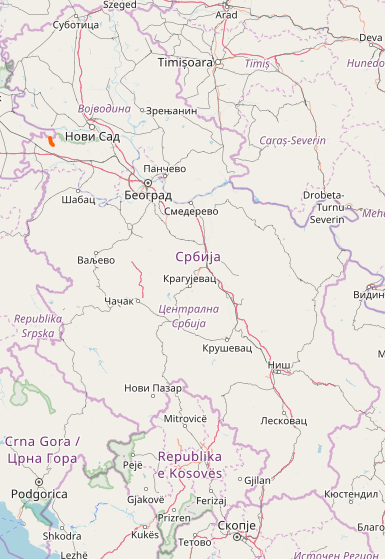

Route information
- Maintained by JP "Putevi Srbije"
- Length: 9.576 km (5.950 mi)

Major junctions
- From: Croatia – Serbia border at Ljuba, Road 46040
- To: Erdevik

Location
- Country: Serbia
- Districts: Srem

Highway system
- Roads in Serbia; Motorways
← 121	→ 123

State Road 122, is an IIA-class road in northern Serbia, connecting Croatia at Ljuba with Erdevik. It is located in Vojvodina.

Before the new road categorization regulation given in 2013, the route wore the following names: M 18 (before 2012) / 118 (after 2012).

The existing route is a regional road with two traffic lanes. By the valid Space Plan of Republic of Serbia the road is not planned for upgrading to main road, and is expected to be conditioned in its current state.

== Sections ==
Section number	Length	Distance	Section name
12201	9.576 km (5.950 mi)	9.576 km (5.950 mi)	Croatia – Serbia border at Ljuba – Erdevik

== See also ==
- Roads in Serbia
