= State Road 121 (Serbia) =

Road in Serbia

State Road 121
- Serbian: Državni put II reda 121; Serbian Cyrillic: Државни пут II реда 121
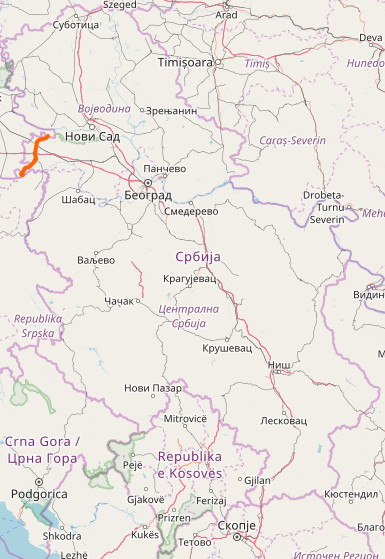

Route information
- Maintained by JP "Putevi Srbije"
- Length: 47.735 km (29.661 mi)

Major junctions
- From: Croatia – Serbia border at Sot, Road 4199
- To: Serbia – Bosnia and Herzegovina border at Jamena

Location
- Country: Serbia
- Districts: Srem

Highway system
- Roads in Serbia; Motorways
← 120	→ 122

State Road 121, is an IIA-class road in northern Serbia, connecting Croatia at Sot with Bosnia and Herzegovina at Jamena. It is located in Vojvodina.

Before the new road categorization regulation given in 2013, the route wore the following names: M 18.1 and P 128 (before 2012) / 117 and 115 (after 2012).

The existing route is a regional road with two traffic lanes. By the valid Space Plan of Republic of Serbia the road is not planned for upgrading to main road, and is expected to be conditioned in its current state.

== Sections ==
Section number	Length	Distance	Section name
12101	12.264 km (7.620 mi)	12.264 km (7.620 mi)	Croatia – Serbia border at Sot – Šid
12102	8.989 km (5.586 mi)	21.253 km (13.206 mi)	Šid – Adaševci interchange
12103	26.482 km (16.455 mi)	47.735 km (29.661 mi)	Adaševci interchange – Serbia–Bosnia and Herzegovina border at Jamena

== See also ==
- Roads in Serbia
