= State Road 124 (Serbia) =

Road in Serbia

State Road 124
- Serbian: Državni put II reda 124; Serbian Cyrillic: Државни пут II реда 124
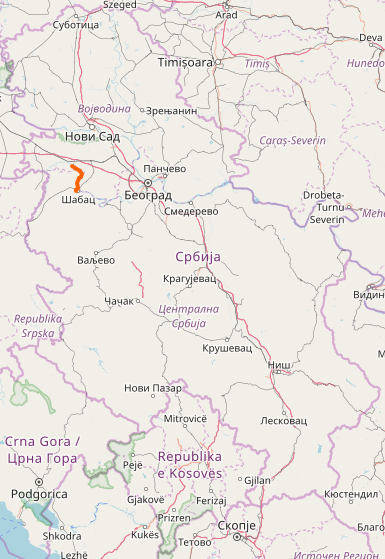

Route information
- Maintained by JP "Putevi Srbije"
- Length: 28.675 km (17.818 mi)

Major junctions
- From: Sremska Mitrovica
- To: Šabac

Location
- Country: Serbia
- Districts: Srem, Mačva

Highway system
- Roads in Serbia; Motorways
← 123	→ 125

State Road 124, is an IIA-class road in northern Serbia, connecting Sremska Mitrovica with Šabac. It is located in Vojvodina and Šumadija and Western Serbia regions.

Before the new road categorization regulation given in 2013, the route did not wear any names.

The existing route is a regional road with two traffic lanes. By the valid Space Plan of Republic of Serbia the road is not planned for upgrading to main road, and is expected to be conditioned in its current state.

== Sections ==
Section number	Length	Distance	Section name
12401	5.110 km (3.175 mi)	5.110 km (3.175 mi)	Sremska Mitrovica (Drenovac) – Vojvodina border (Drenovac)
12402	21.415 km (13.307 mi)	26.525 km (16.482 mi)	Vojvodina border (Drenovac) – Šabac (Glušci)
12403	2.150 km (1.336 mi)	28.675 km (17.818 mi)	Šabac (Glušci) – Šabac (Drenovac)

== See also ==
- Roads in Serbia
