= Berović =

Origin
- Region of origin: Croatia, Serbia, Montenegro and Bosnia and Herzegovina

Other names
- Variant form: Berić

Berović is a surname traditionally used in Croatia, Serbia, Montenegro and Bosnia and Herzegovina. It may refer to:

- Đorđe Berović (1845–1897), Ottoman Serb official
- Maya Berović (born 1987), Bosnian pop singer
- Berović Beton (Construction Company)
- Radivoje Berović (1900–1975), Serbian academic
- Filip Berović (fl. 1850), diplomat and merchant
- Petar Berović (1797–1871),
- Đakomo Berović,
- Joso Berović,
- Rade Berović, Serbian master builder

== See also ==
- Berić
- Perović
