= Jarkovci =

Jarkovci Јарковци (Serbian)
- Village (Selo)
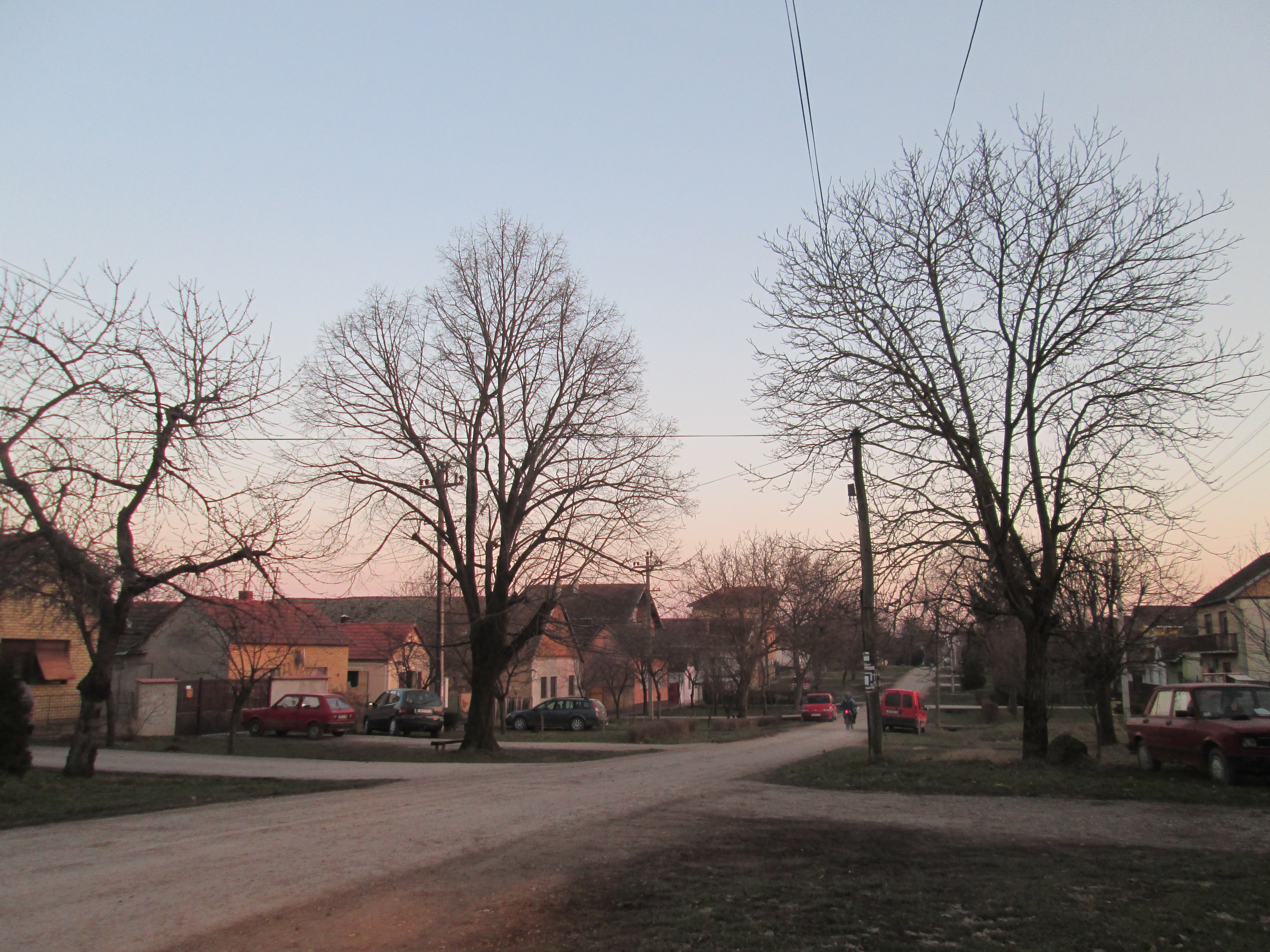

- Location within Vojvodina Location within Serbia Location within Europe
- Coordinates: 45°03′N 20°01′E
- Country: Serbia
- Province: Vojvodina
- District: Srem
- Municipality: Inđija

Population (2002)
  - Total: 604
- Time zone: UTC+1 (CET)
  - Summer (DST): UTC+2 (CEST)

Jarkovci (Serbian Cyrillic: Јарковци) is a village in Serbia. It is situated in the Inđija municipality, in the Srem District, Vojvodina province. The village has a Serb ethnic majority and its population numbering 604 people (2002 census).

== Name ==
The name of the village in Serbian is plural.

== See also ==
- List of places in Serbia
- List of cities, towns and villages in Vojvodina
