= Church of the Presentation of the Theotokos, Inđija =

Church of the Presentation of the Theotokos
- Црква ваведења пресвете Богородице
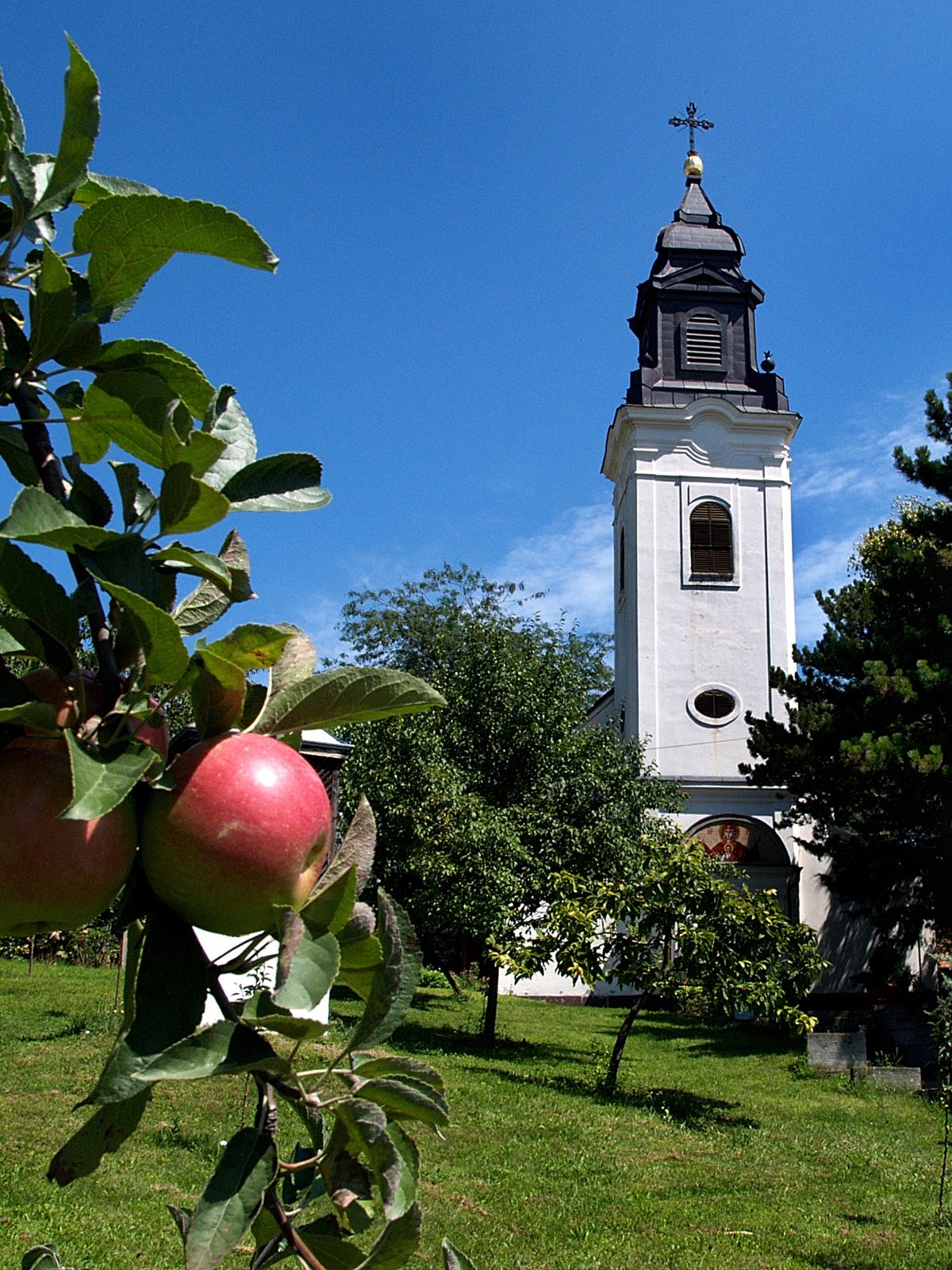
- Church of the Dormition of the Theotokos
- Church of the Presentation of the Theotokos
- 45°02′49″N 20°04′43″E
- Location: Inđija, Vojvodina
- Country: Serbia
- Denomination: Serbian Orthodox

History
- Status: Church
- Dedication: Presentation of the Theotokos

Architecture
- Functional status: Active
- Years built: 1754

Administration
- Archdiocese: Eparchy of Srem

The Church of the Presentation of the Theotokos (Serbian: Црква ваведења пресвете Богородице) is a Serbian Orthodox church in Inđija, Vojvodina, Serbia. The building was constructed between 1754 and 1755. It is a single-nave building with modest dimensions, built in the style of the medieval Raška architectural school. The interior of the church was painted by Jovan Štajner, a painter from Sombor, in the late 19th century. Štajner also gilded the carvings of the iconostasis and restored the icons.

Notable restorations include cleaning and restoration of the iconostasis in 1858, repainting of the Metropolitan throne icons in 1923, and interior painting by Nikodim Brkić in 1954. Major conservation and restoration work on the church was carried out in 1979, during which two rooms for candle lighting were added near the bell tower. The iconostasis was conserved from 1980 to 1986.

== See also ==
- Eparchy of Srem
