= Slankamenački Vinogradi =

Slankamenački Vinogradi Сланкаменачки Виногради (Serbian) Slankamenské Vinohrady (Slovak)
- Village (Selo)
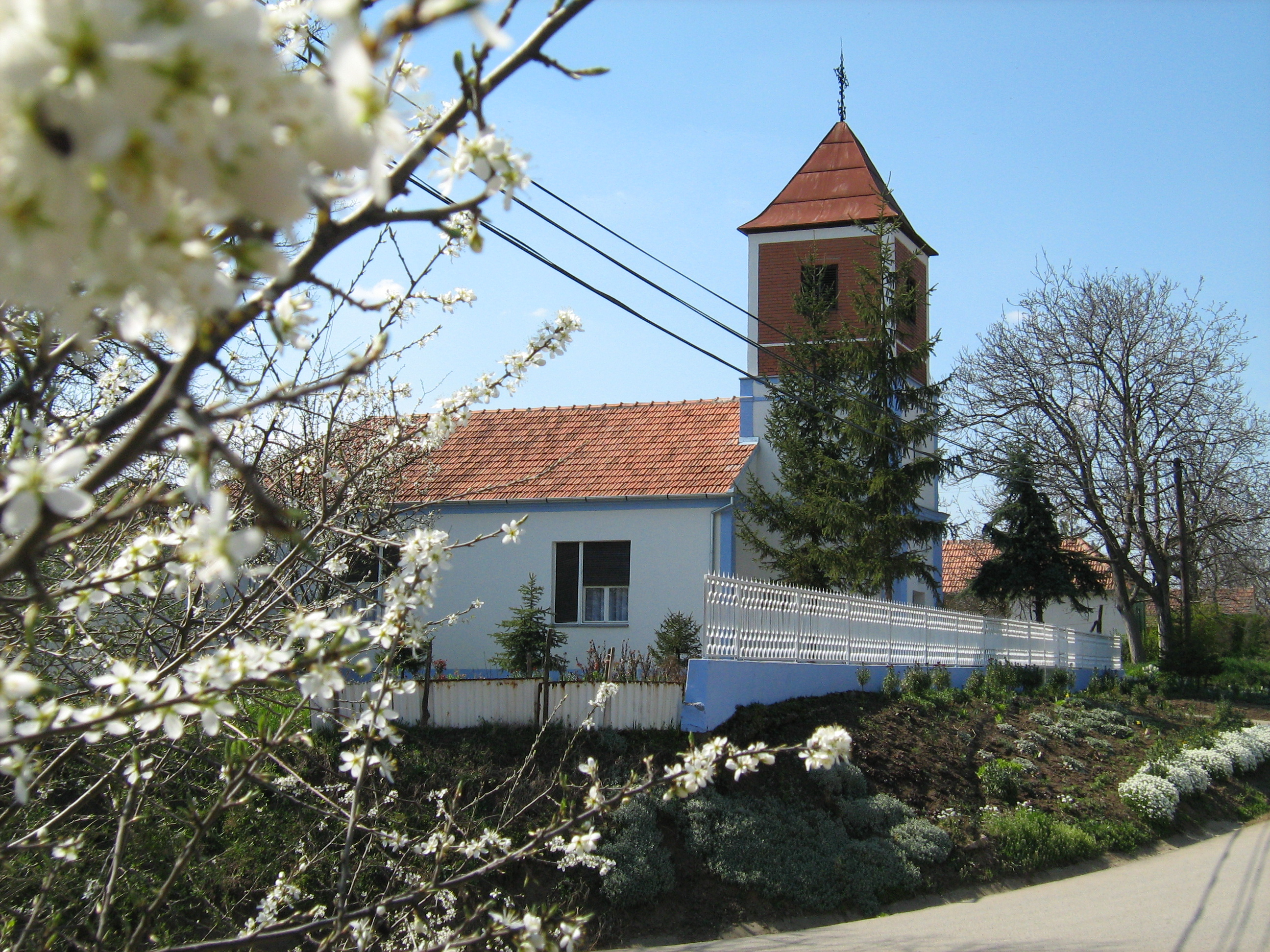
- Slovak Evangelic Church

- Location within Vojvodina Location within Serbia Location within Europe
- Coordinates: 45°09′N 20°11′E
- Country: Serbia
- Province: Vojvodina
- District: Srem
- Municipality: Inđija

Population (2022)
  - Total: 190
- Time zone: UTC+1 (CET)
  - Summer (DST): UTC+2 (CEST)

Slankamenački Vinogradi (Serbian Cyrillic: Сланкаменачки Виногради, Slovak: Slankamenské Vinohrady) is a village located in the Inđija municipality, Srem District, Vojvodina, Serbia. The village has a population of 190 people (2022 census).

== Name ==
The name of the village in Serbian is plural.

== Demographics ==
=== Historical population ===
- 1961: 581
- 1971: 533
- 1981: 493
- 1991: 278
- 2011: 266
- 2011: 253
- 2022: 190

=== Ethnic groups ===
According to data from the 2022 census, ethnic groups in the village include:

- 126 (66.3%) Slovaks
- 34 (17.9%) Serbs
- Others/Undeclared/Unknown

== See also ==
- List of places in Serbia
- List of cities, towns and villages in Vojvodina
