= Bojan Banjac =

Serbian footballer

Personal information
- Full name: Bojan Banjac
- Date of birth: 24 October 1971 (age 55)
- Place of birth: Inđija, SFR Yugoslavia
- Height: 1.78 m (5 ft 10 in)
- Position: Midfielder

Youth career
- Inđija

Senior career*
Years	Team	Apps	(Gls)
1993–1996	Zemun	64	(7)
1996–1998	Lille	38	(1)
- * Club domestic league appearances and goals

Bojan Banjac (Serbian Cyrillic: Бојан Бањац; born 24 October 1971) is a former Serbian association footballer.

== Career ==
After playing with FK Zemun in the First League of FR Yugoslavia, Banjac moved to France in 1996 where he played 23 Ligue 1 games for Lille OSC in 1996–97 season. Banjac had impressed in Zemun's 1996 UEFA Intertoto Cup group stage against Lille's rivals Guingamp, and Jean-Michel Cavalli signed him before the start of the 1996–97 season.
