= Berić =

Berić (Serbian Cyrillic: Берић) is a Serbo-Croatian surname. Notable people with the surname include:

- Aleksandar Berić (1906–1941), Yugoslav military officer
- Dejan Berić (born 1974), Serbian volunteer
- Miroslav Berić (born 1973), Serbian basketball player
- Robert Berić (born 1991), Slovenian footballer

== See also ==
- Berović
