= Ljukovo =

Ljukovo Љуково (Serbian)
- Village (Selo)
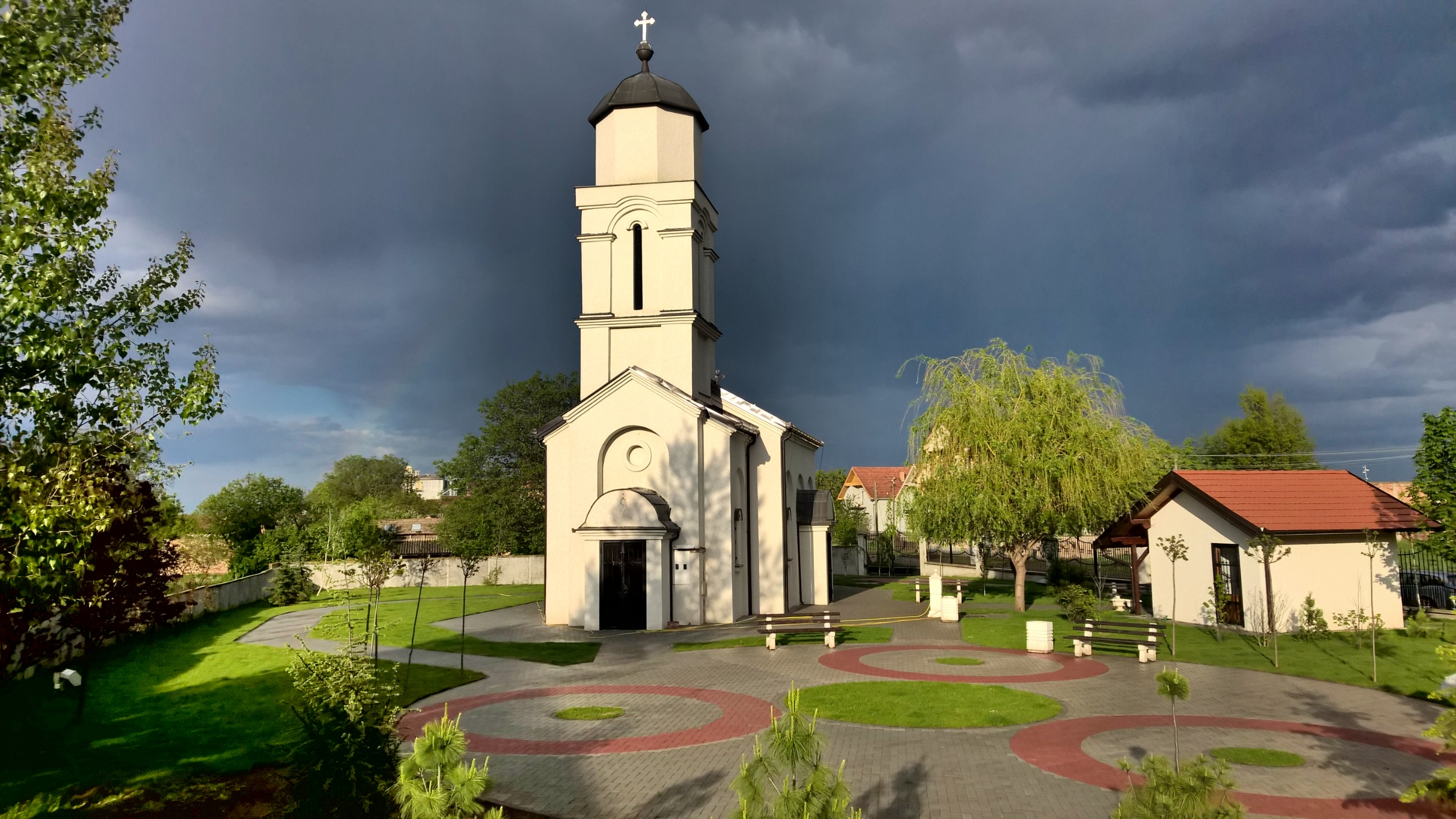
- The new Orthodox church.

- Location within Vojvodina Location within Serbia Location within Europe
- Coordinates: 45°02′N 20°01′E
- Country: Serbia
- Province: Vojvodina
- District: Srem
- Municipality: Inđija

Population (2011)
  - Total: 1,525
- Time zone: UTC+1 (CET)
  - Summer (DST): UTC+2 (CEST)

Ljukovo (Serbian Cyrillic: Љуково) is a village in the Inđija municipality, in Serbian northern province of Vojvodina. The village has a population numbering 1,525 people (2011 census).

The village was formed in 1927 by workers on the nearby large Jojkić farm, settled from the Lika region in today's Croatia. Located around 5 km west of Inđija, it was named after the nearby stream of Ljukovo. After the World War II it had recorded population of around 500. It was mainly settled by migrants from Lika, Bosnia and Kordun. After the Yugoslav wars of 1990s, they were joined by the wave of refugees from Kninska krajina, Cazin and Sanski Most. The villagers were mainly employed in industrial facilities in Inđija, chiefly the once great "Yugoslav Fur Factory". Today, most residents are involved in agriculture.

Foundations of the village's Orthodox church were laid in 1992, and it was completed in 2003. It is dedicated to the Ascension of Mary (Uspenje presvete Bogorodice).

Ljukovo became famous for its "Liars' Club" (Клуб Лажова), whose president was the local jokester Mirko Bera, and after his death, his son Stamenko took over.

== Historical population ==
- 1961: 897
- 1971: 967
- 1981: 1,191
- 1991: 1,301
- 2002: 1,604
- 2011: 1,525

== See also ==
- List of places in Serbia
- List of cities, towns and villages in Vojvodina
