= Maradik =

Maradik Марадик (Serbian) Maradék (Hungarian)
- Village (Selo)
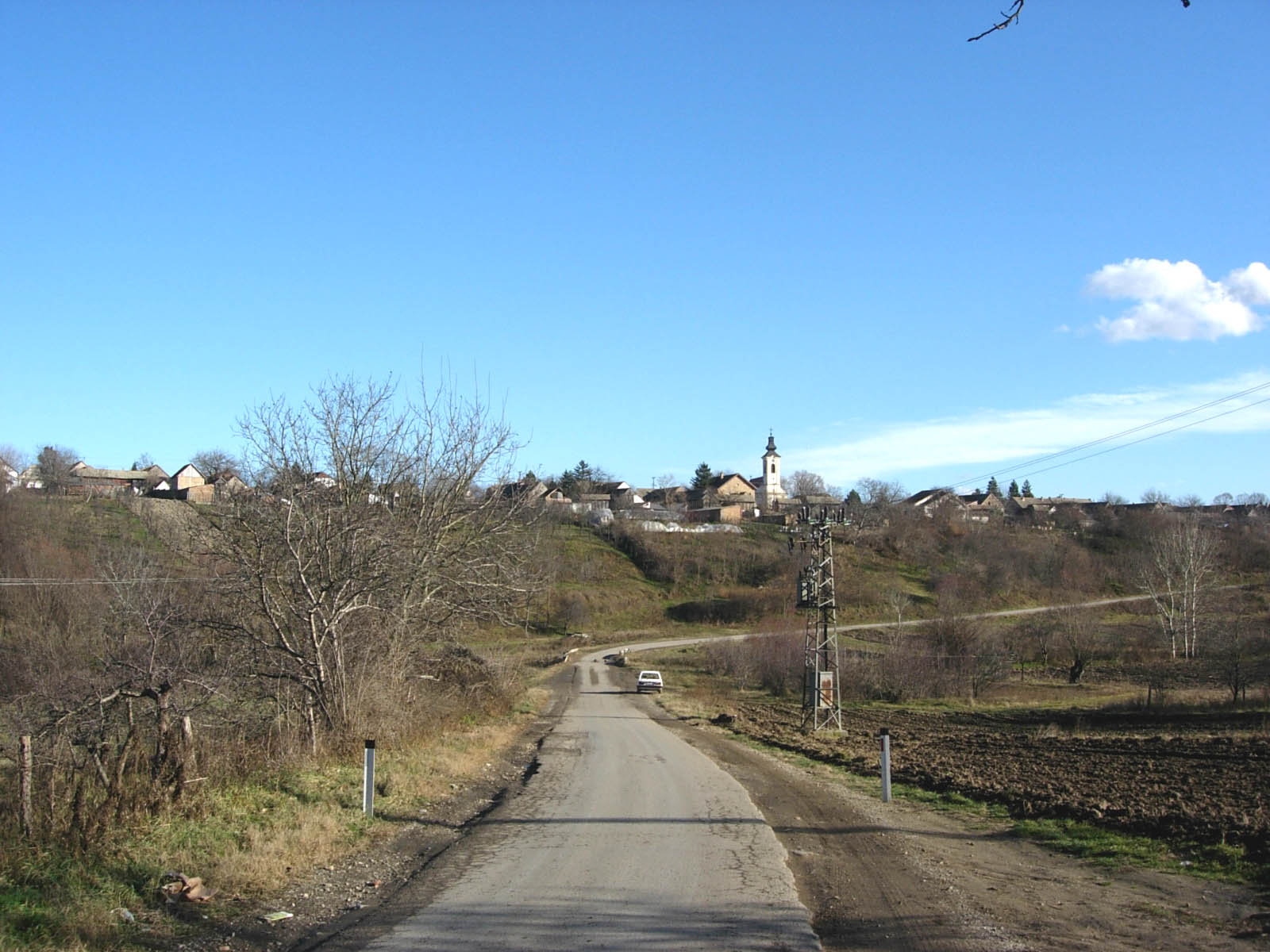
- View of the village

- Location within Vojvodina Location within Serbia Location within Europe
- Coordinates: 45°06′N 20°00′E
- Country: Serbia
- Province: Vojvodina
- Region: Syrmia
- District: Srem
- Municipality: Inđija

Population (2002)
  - Total: 2,095
- Time zone: UTC+1 (CET)
  - Summer (DST): UTC+2 (CEST)

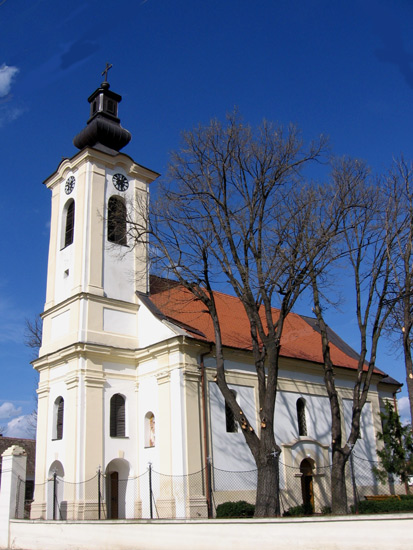
Serbian Orthodox church

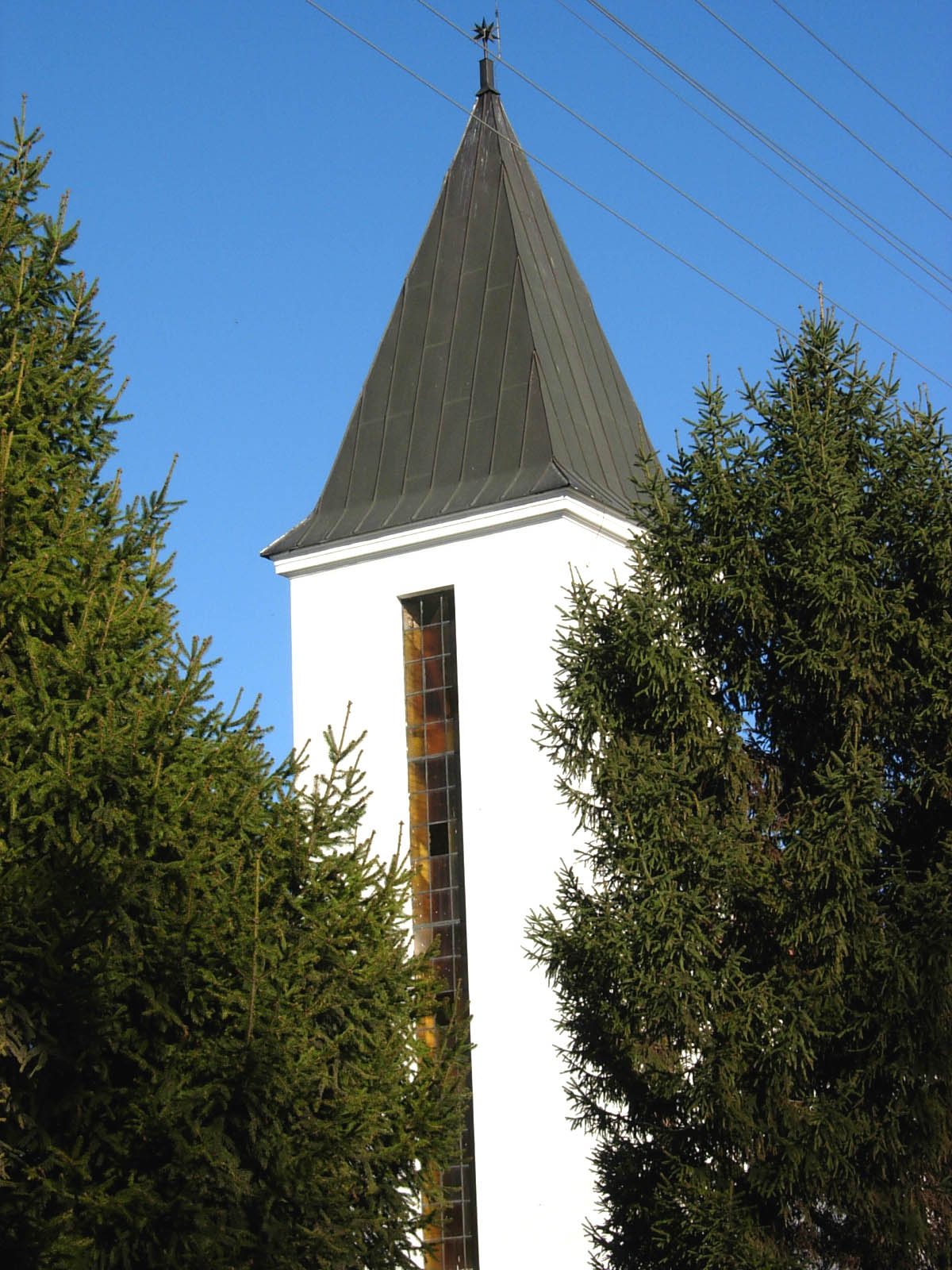
The Calvinist church.

Maradik (Serbian Cyrillic: Марадик) is a village in Serbia. It is situated in the Autonomous Province of Vojvodina, in the region of Syrmia (Syrmia District), in Inđija municipality. Maradik is located about 10 km west of Inđija. The village has a 60% Serb ethnic majority and its total population in 2011 was 2,095.

== Name ==
In Serbian, the village is known as Maradik or Марадик, in Croatian as Maradik, and in Hungarian as Maradék.

== History ==
After Hungarian Roman Catholic residents of the village were rejected by bishop Josip Juraj Strossmayer in their request to get Hungarian language speaking priest, their representatives went to Budapest to meet reformed bishop to request collective conversion to Protestantism.

== Ethnic groups (2002 census) ==
- Serbs = 1,394 (60.66%)
- Hungarians = 552 (24.02%)
- Croats = 105 (4.57%)
- Yugoslavs = 90 (3.92%)

== Historical population ==
- 1961: 2,651
- 1971: 2,350
- 1981: 2,255
- 1991: 2,120
- 2002: 2,298
- 2011: 2,095

== Sources ==
- Slobodan Ćurčić, Broj stanovnika Vojvodine, Novi Sad, 1996.

== See also ==
- List of places in Serbia
- List of cities, towns and villages in Vojvodina
