= Vladimir Tintor (footballer) =

Serbian footballer and coach

Personal information
- Date of birth: 1 September 1979 (age 47)
- Place of birth: Inđija, SFR Yugoslavia
- Height: 1.82 m (5 ft 11 1/2 in)
- Position: Midfielder

Youth career
- 1995–1997: Inđija
- 1997–1998: Red Star Belgrade
- Baćevac

Senior career*
Years	Team	Apps	(Gls)
1998–1999	Železnik	18	(5)
1999–2001	Budućnost Banatski Dvor	45	(13)
2001	Vojvodina	0	(0)
2002–2004	Budućnost Banatski Dvor	68	(16)
2004–2005	Red Star Belgrade	7	(0)
2005–2006	Rad	17	(4)
2006–2007	Inđija	35	(5)
2007	Bodens BK		
2008	Napredak Kruševac	6	(0)
2009	Zhetysu	4	(1)
2009	Čukarički	10	(1)
2010	Berane	15	(2)
2011	Dinamo Vranje	17	(7)
2011–2012	Novi Sad	12	(1)
- * Club domestic league appearances and goals

Vladimir Tintor (Serbian Cyrillic: Bлaдимиp Tинтop; born 1 September 1979) is a Serbian retired football midfielder and now he is working as a football coach in Serbia with UEFA Pro Licence.

== Career ==
After playing in the youth tams of his hometown club FK Inđija, his talent was spotted by the giants Red Star Belgrade that insisted he moved to their youth team. In the next years he would play in a number of Serbian top league clubs, namely, FK Železnik, FK Budućnost Banatski Dvor, FK Vojvodina, Red Star Belgrade, FK Rad, FK Inđija, FK Napredak Kruševac, FK Čukarički, but also in Swedish Bodens BK, Kazakh FC Zhetysu and in Montenegrin FK Berane.
