= Inđija =

Inđija Инђија
- Town and municipality
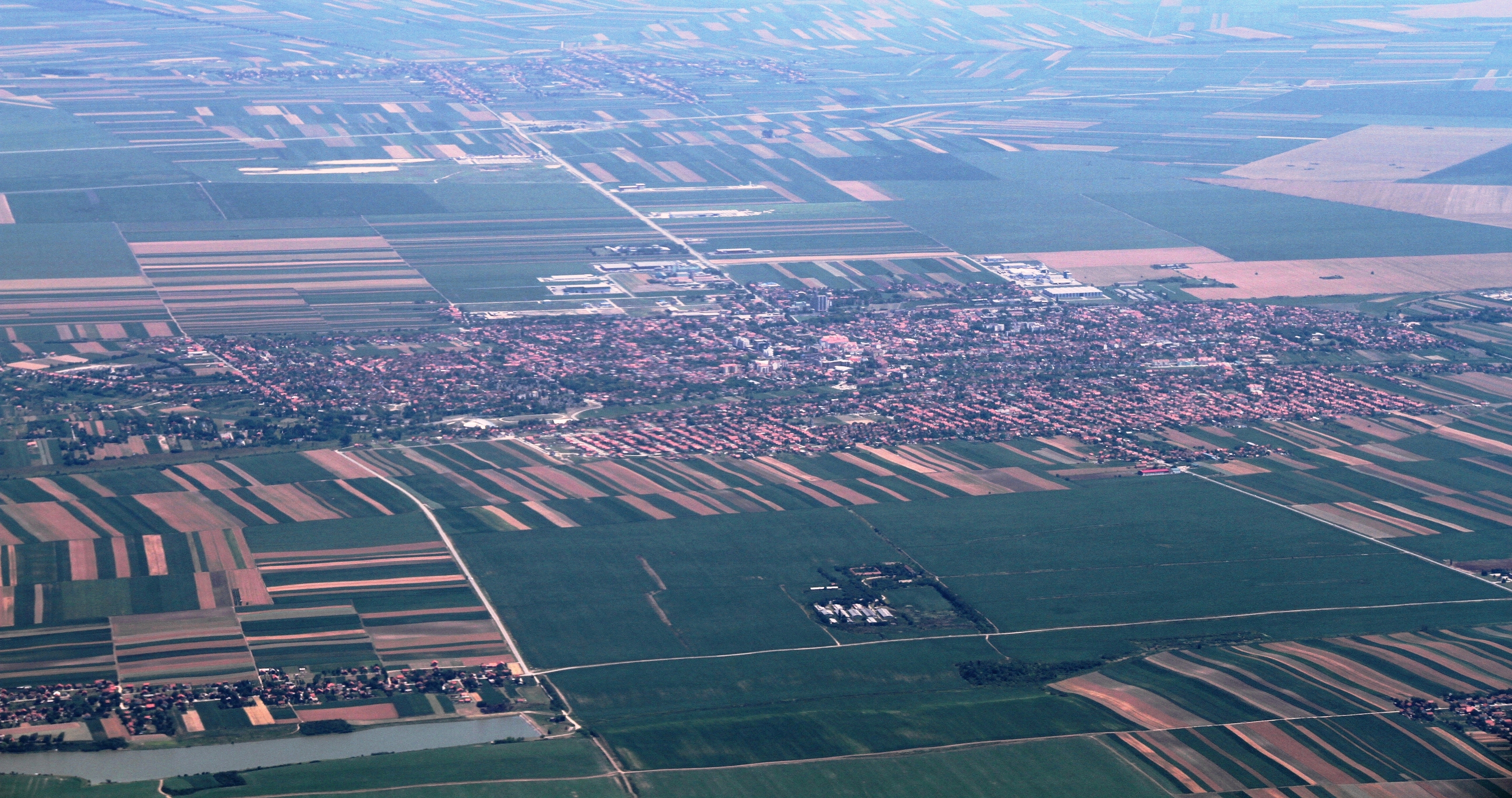
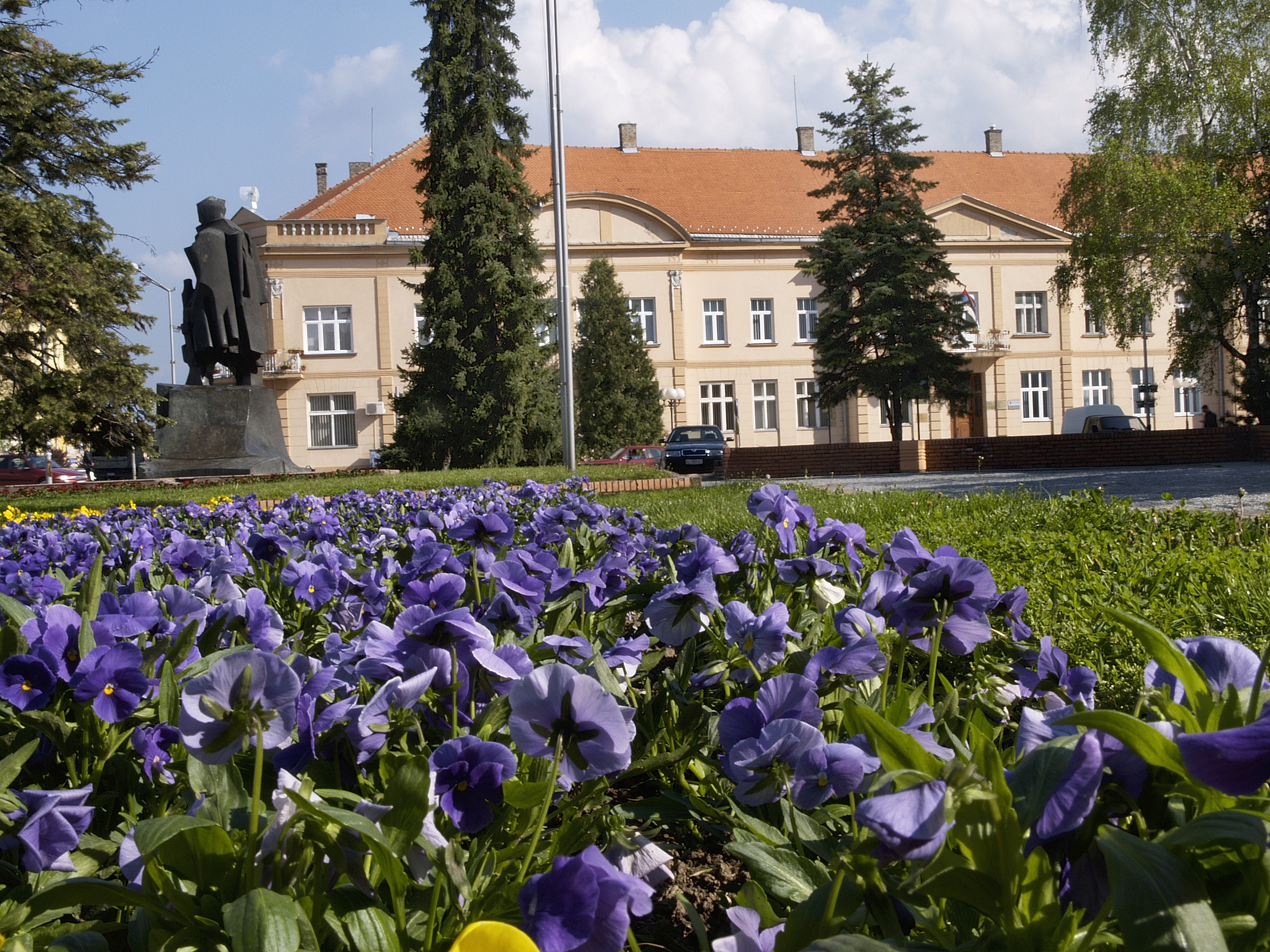
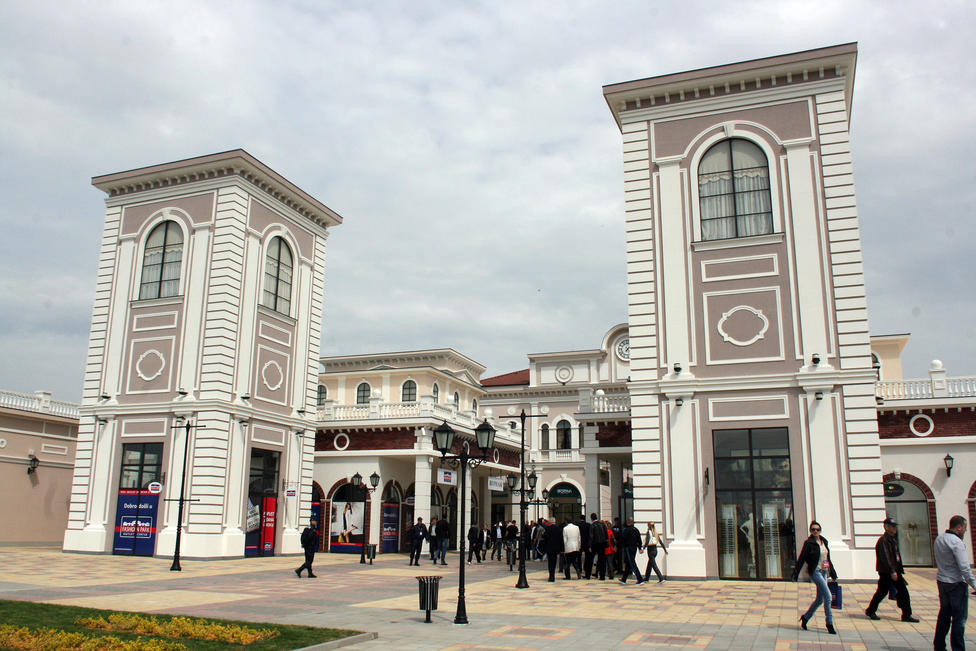
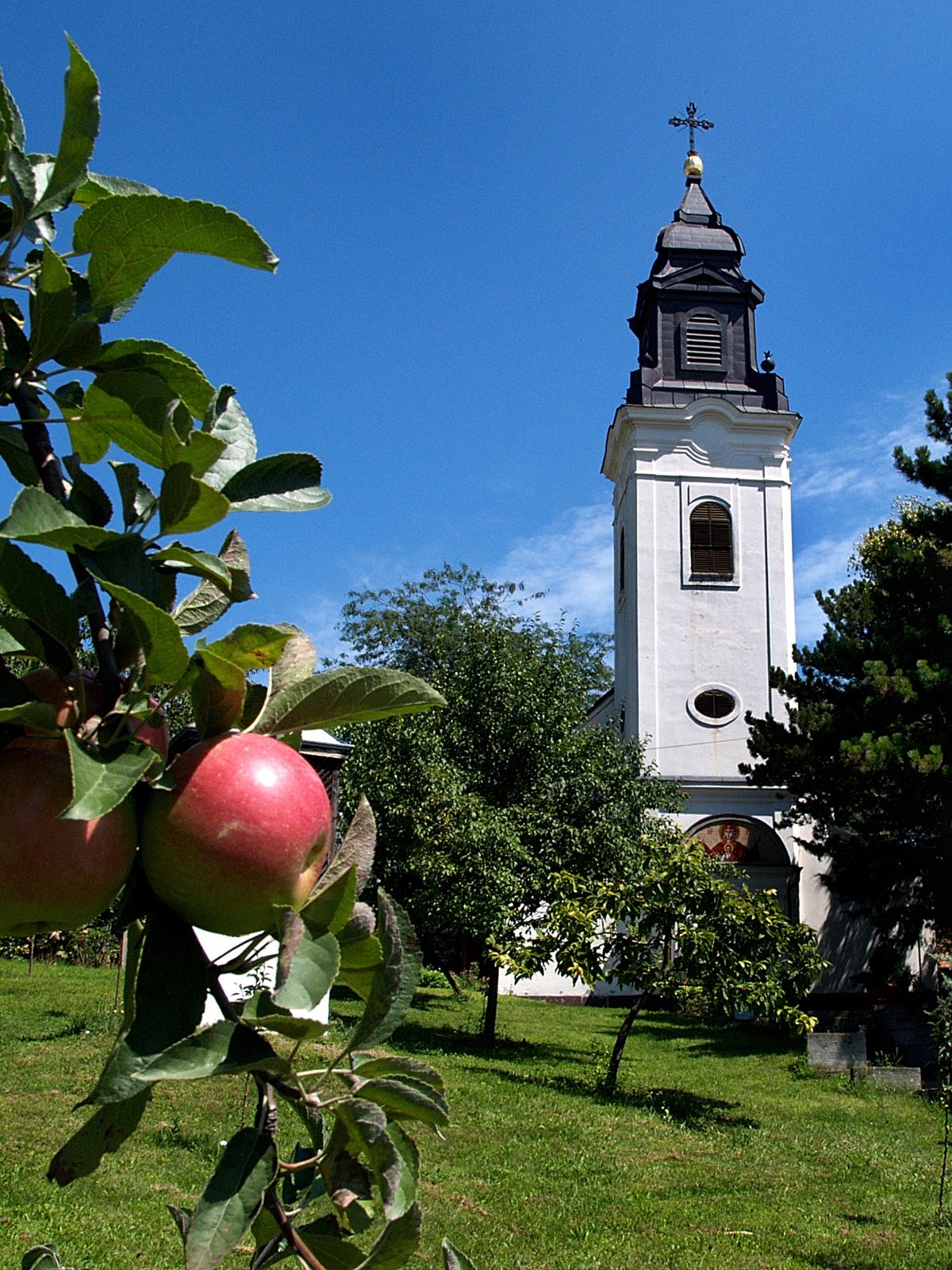
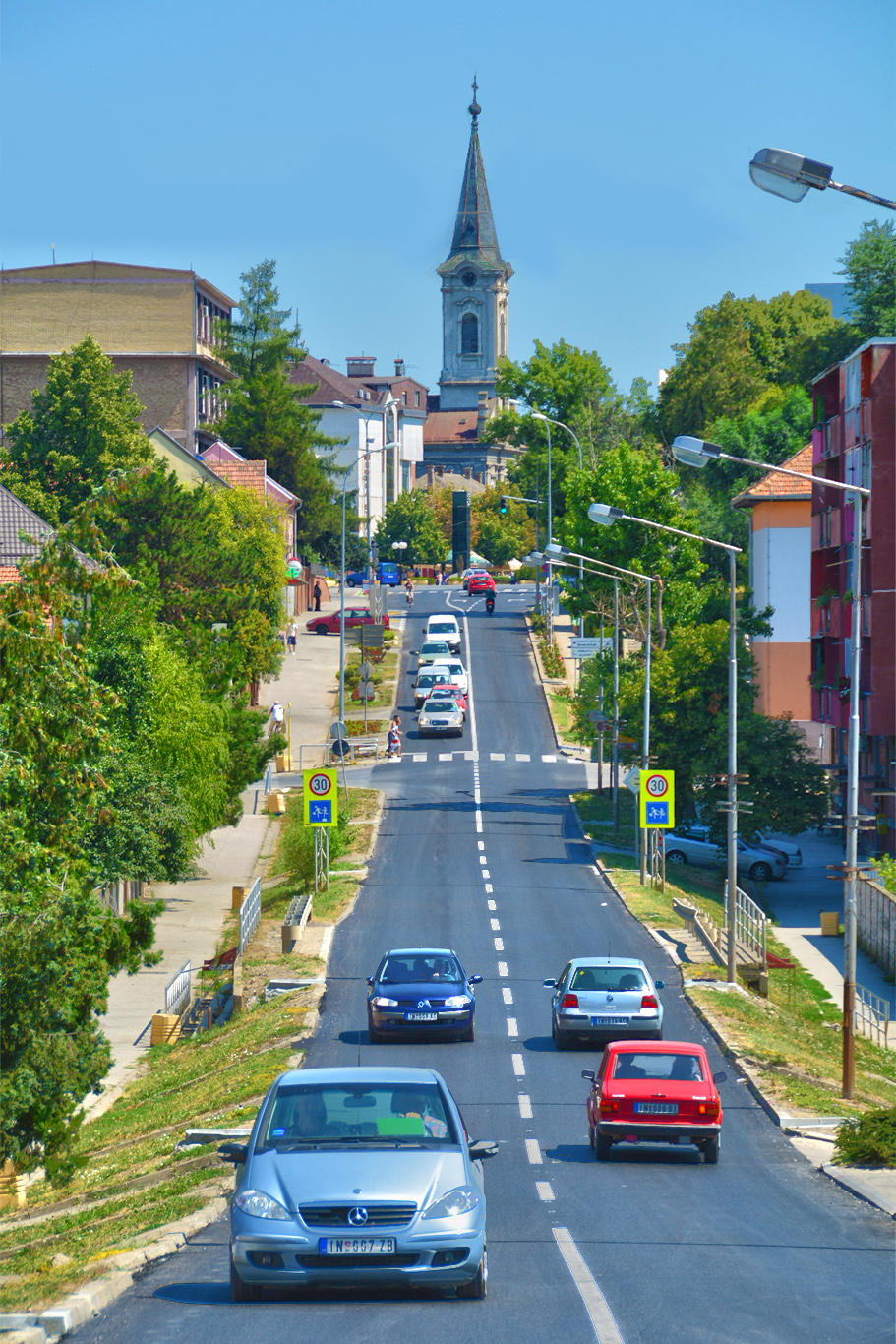
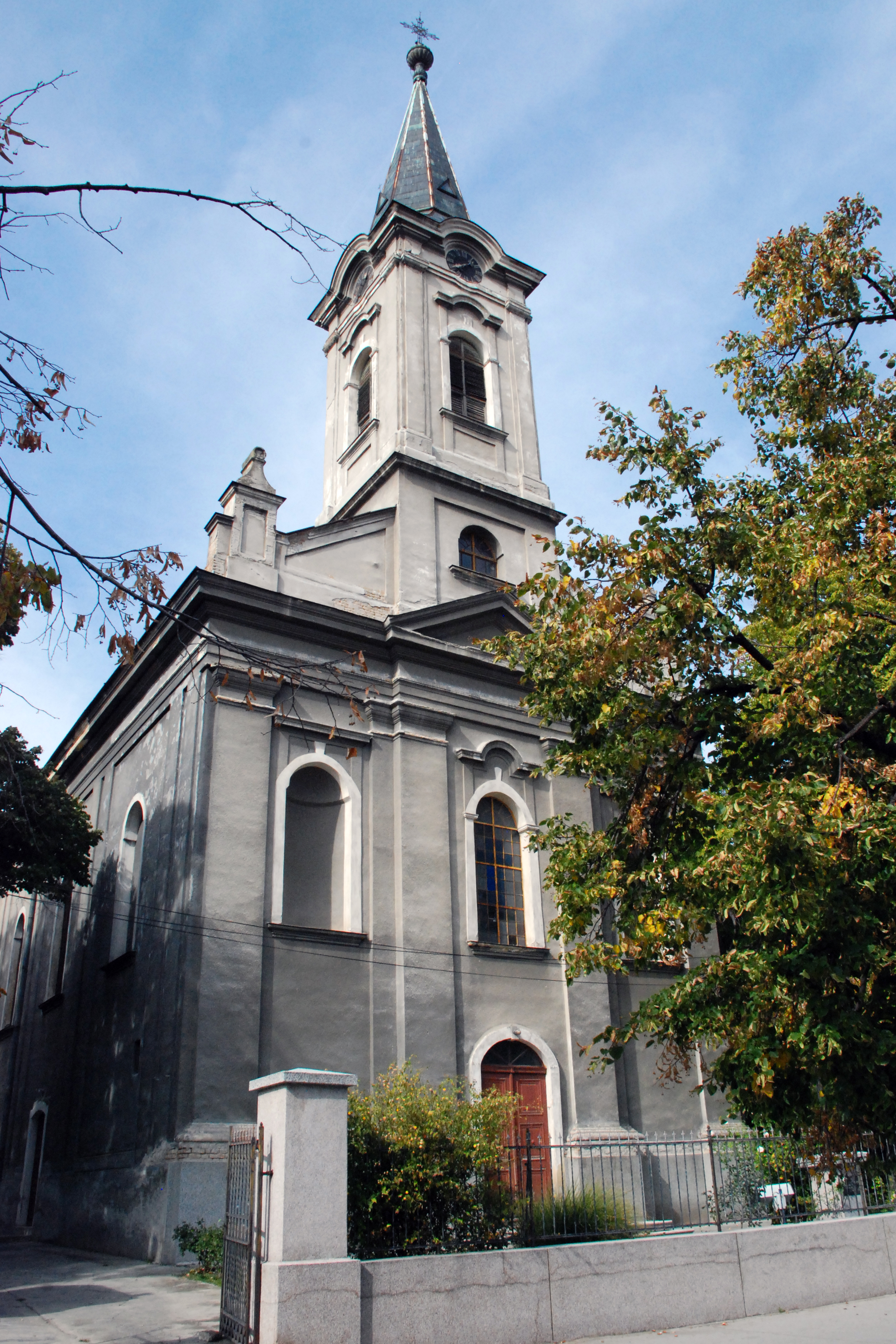
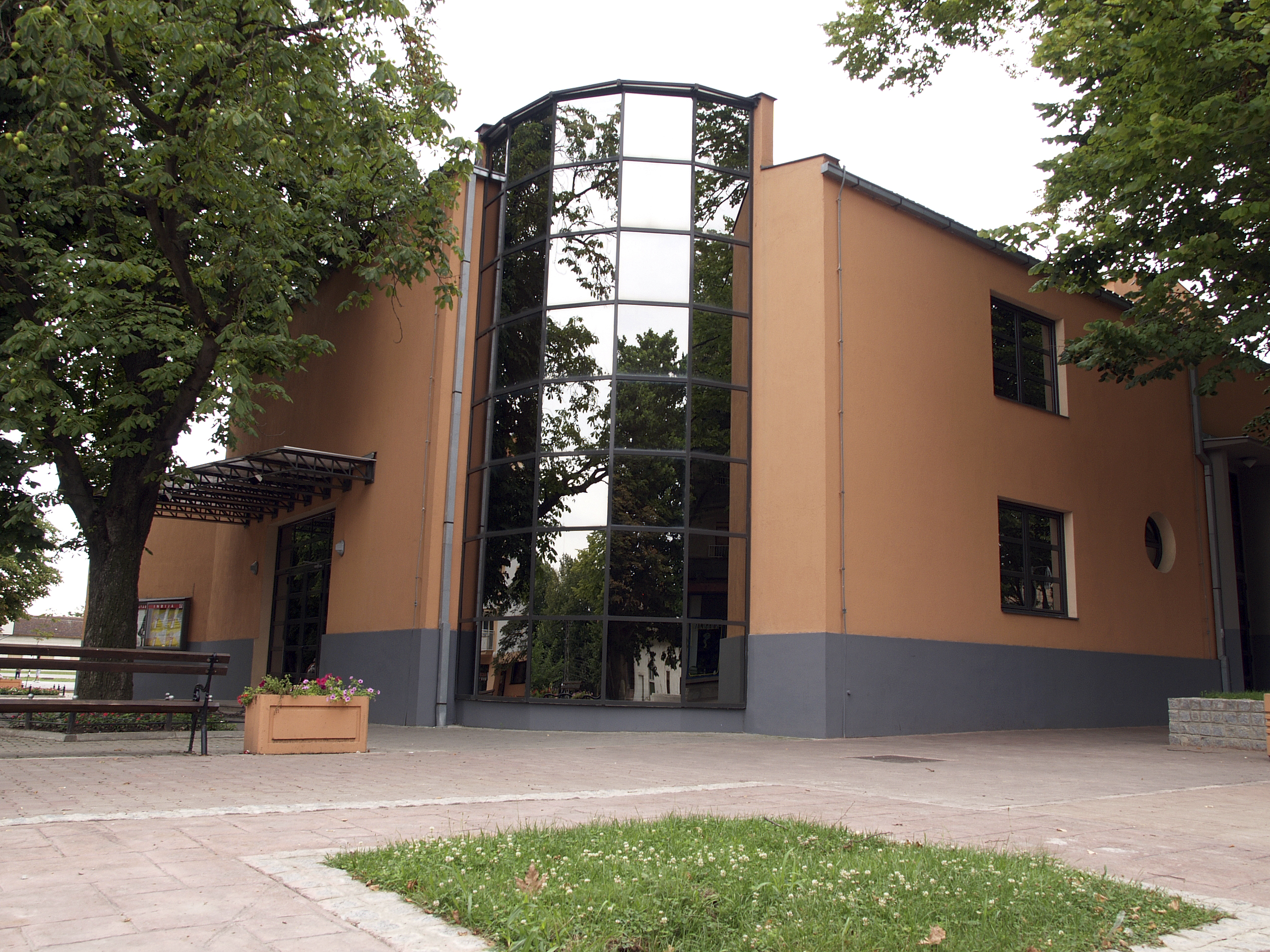
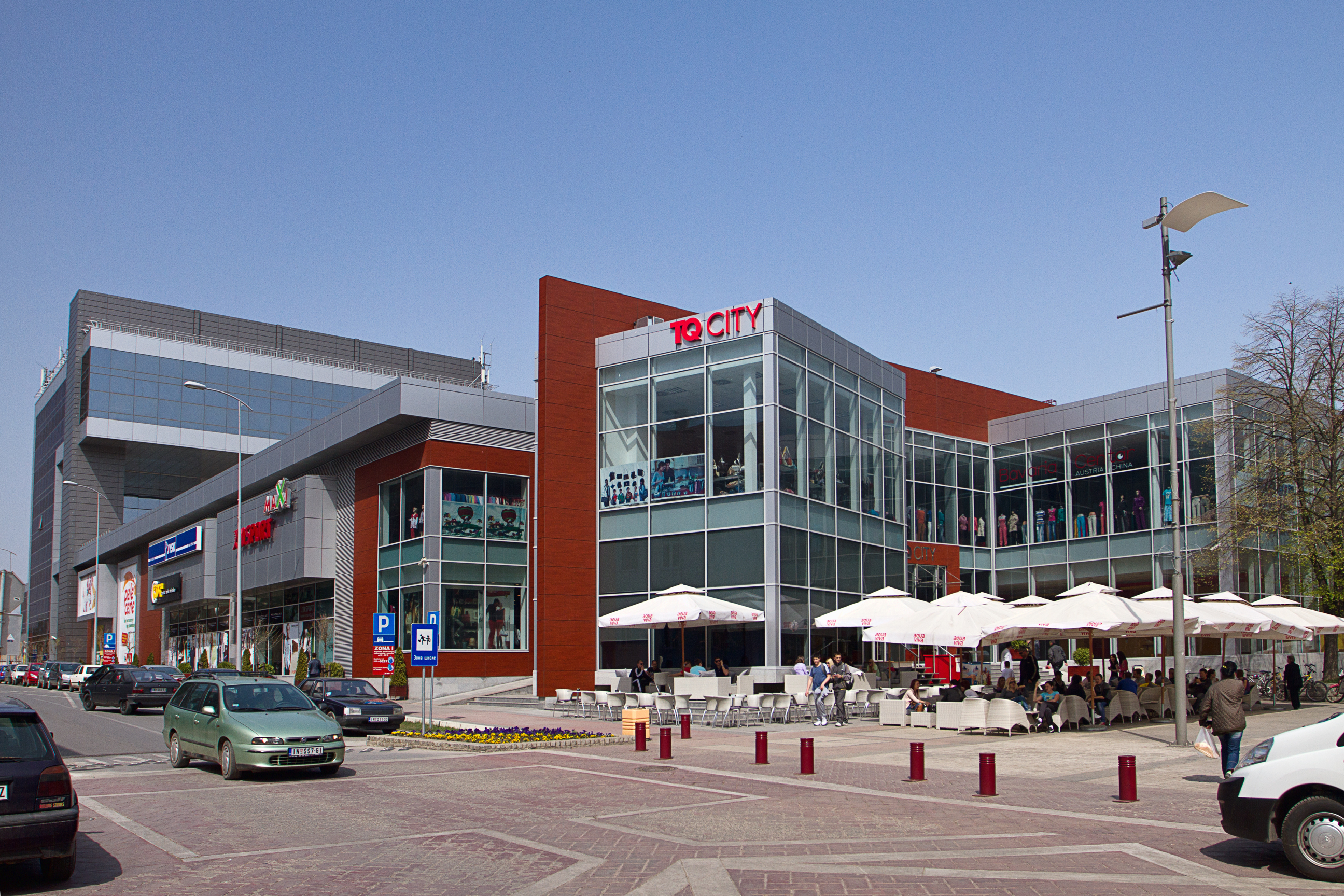
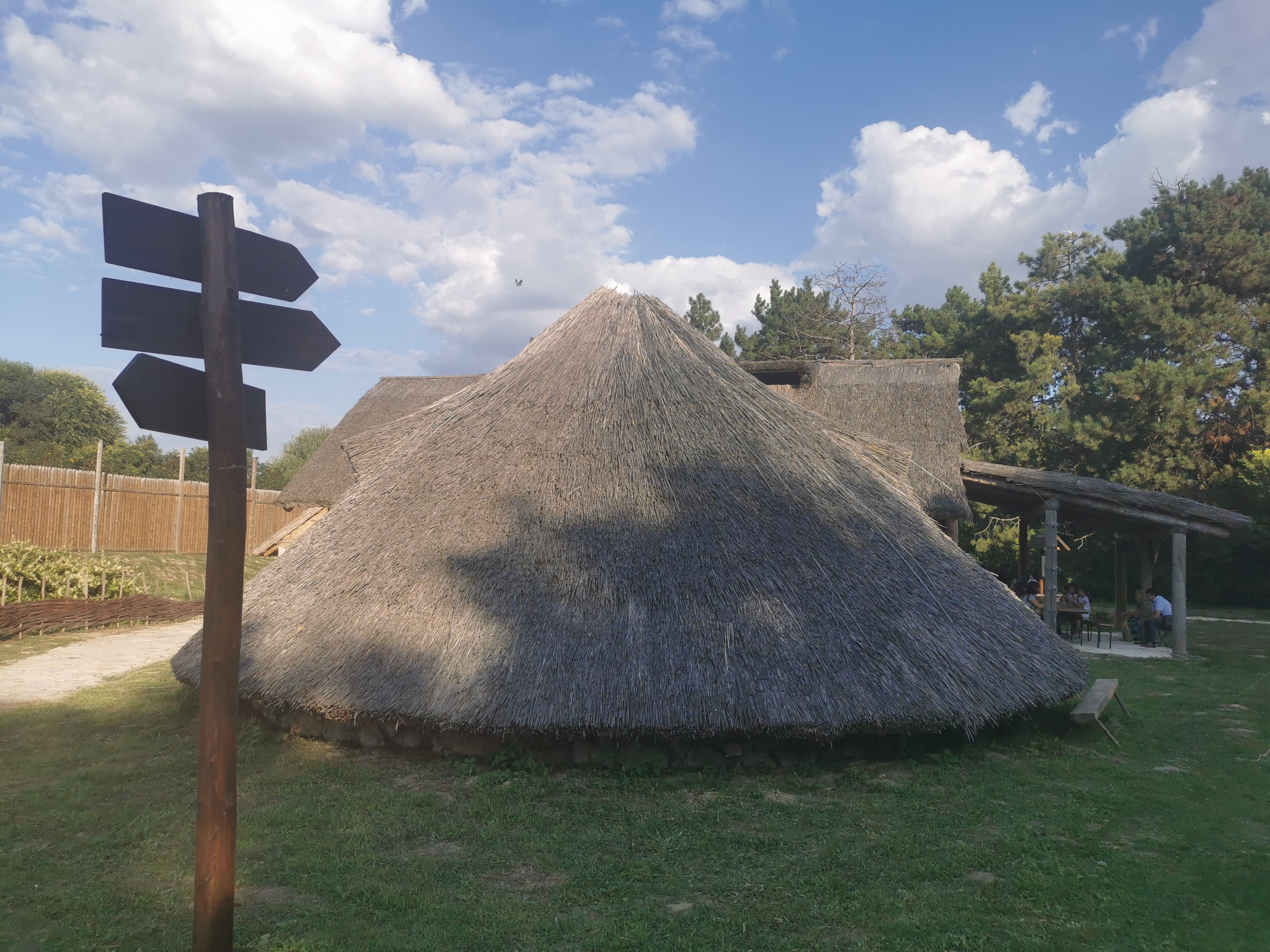
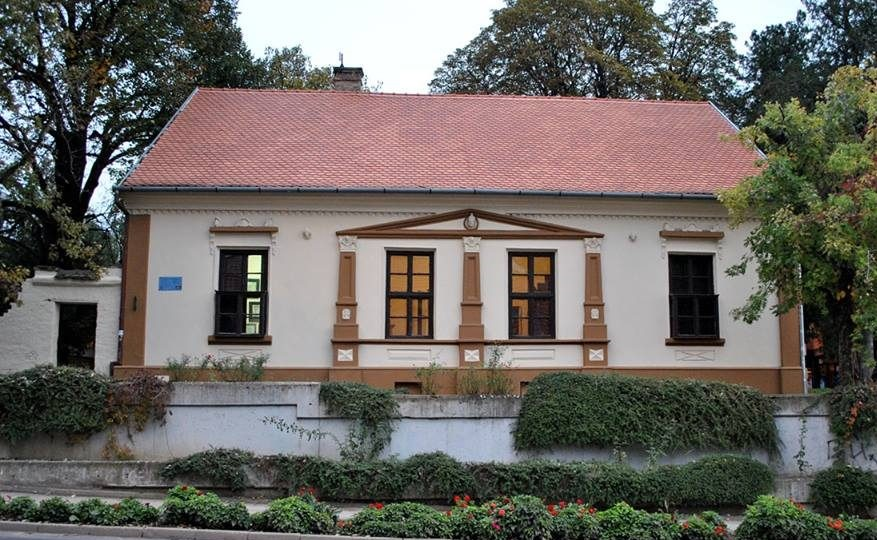
- Panorama of Inđija Inđija Town Hall Outlet Park Inđija Church of the Presentation of the Theotokos Cara Dušana Street in Inđija Church of St. Peter and Paul Inđija Cultural Centre TQ City Celtic Village Dorđe Vojinović's House

- Coat of arms

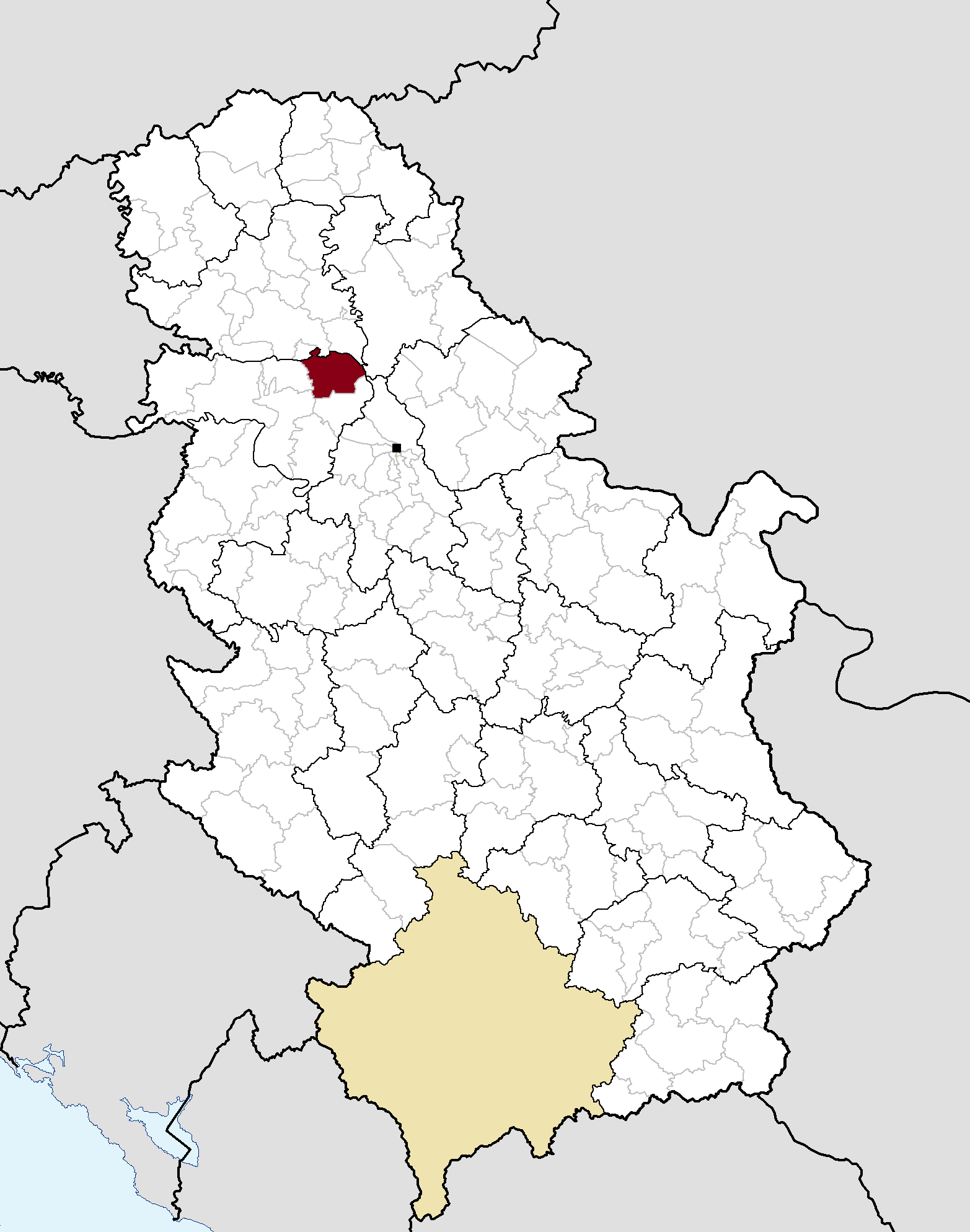
- Location of the municipality of Inđija within Serbia
- Coordinates: 45°03′N 20°05′E
- Country: Serbia
- Province: Vojvodina
- District: Srem
- Settlements: 11

Government
  - Mayor: Marko Gašić (SNS)

Area
  - Town: 47.96 km^{2} (18.52 sq mi)
  - Municipality: 384.61 km^{2} (148.50 sq mi)
- Elevation: 116 m (381 ft)

Population (2022 census)
  - Town: 24,450
  - Town density: 509.8/km^{2} (1,320/sq mi)
  - Municipality: 43,443
  - Municipality density: 112.95/km^{2} (292.55/sq mi)
- Time zone: UTC+1 (CET)
  - Summer (DST): UTC+2 (CEST)
- Postal code: 22320
- Area code: +381(0)22
- Car plates: IN
- Official languages: Serbian
- Website: www.indjija.rs www.indjija.biz

Inđija (Serbian Cyrillic: Инђија, pronounced [ǐndʑija]) is a town and a municipality located in the Srem District of the Autonomous Province of Vojvodina, Serbia. As of 2022, the town has a total population of 24,450, while the municipality has 43,433 inhabitants. It is located in the geographical region of Syrmia.

== Name ==
According to the legend, the name of the town comes from Turkish word "ikindia" – meaning evening prayer and is related to the time after 1699 when the town fell under Turkish rule. On the other hand, there is the claim that the town was named after the name of Orthodox women – Inđija. Newest researches states that name of the city is taken from Latin word "Indigena" meaning "indigenous". This theory is most relevant, due to presence of ancient Illyrian, Celtic and Roman settlements in neighbourhood of modern Inđija. In Serbo-Croatian, the town is known as Inđija (Serbian Cyrillic: Инђија), in Hungarian as Ingyia, in German as India, in Slovak as India or Indjija, and in Rusyn as Индїя.

== History ==
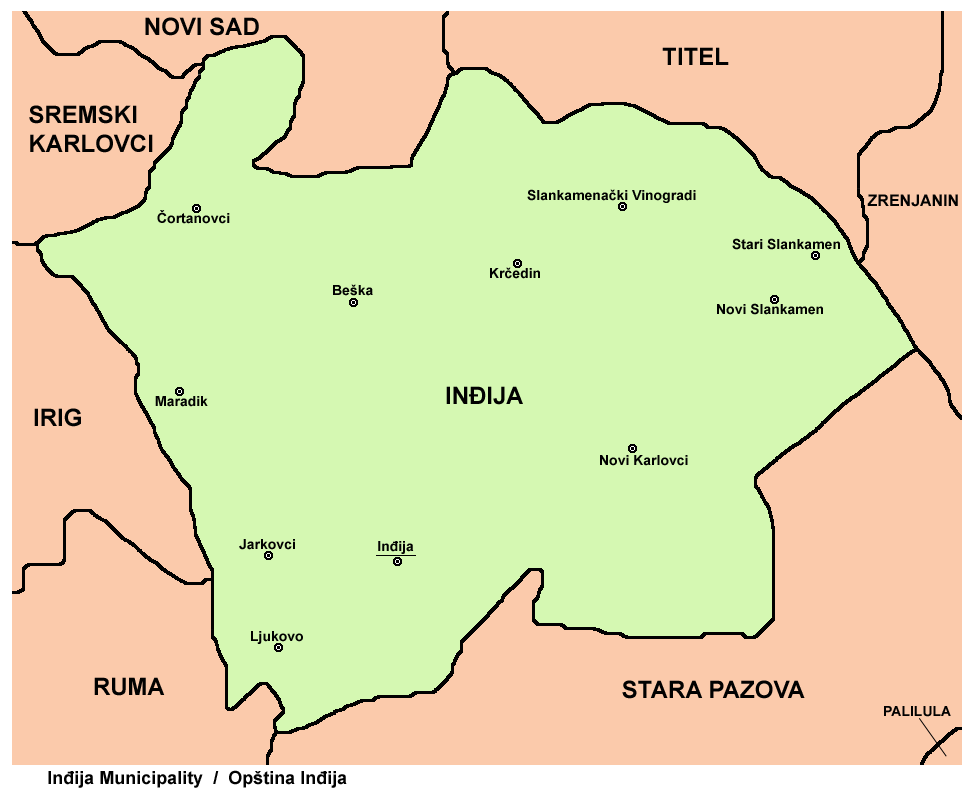
Map of Inđija municipality - Town of Inđija with surrounding villages.

SVG map of Municipality of Indjija's settlements

The first verifiable evidence of Inđija's existence is in the Charter of Despot Jovan Branković from 1496, but it may have existed as early as 1455 as possession of Hungarian noble family Sulyok. During the Ottoman administration (16th-18th centuries), Inđija was mostly populated by ethnic Serbs, and was part of the Ottoman Sanjak of Syrmia.

Since 1717, Inđija was part of the Habsburg monarchy, and became a feudal domain of Count Marko Pejačević of the Pejačević family that originated from Chiprovtsi, Bulgaria. The old medieval Inđija was placed a little bit to the north than today town. The present-day Inđija was founded by the Serb settlers from Beška and Patka in 1746. According to the description from 1746 it had 60 households, while in 1791 it has already grown to 122 households with 1,054 residents. In the second half of the 18th century, this new settlement was mostly populated by ethnic Serbs. Germans and Czechs start settling in Inđija at the beginning of the 19th century, while Hungarians migrated there towards the end of the century. During the time, Germans became dominant population in the town.

In the middle of the 18th century, Inđija became part of the Syrmia County of the Kingdom of Slavonia, which also was part of the Habsburg Kingdom of Croatia and of the Habsburg Kingdom of Hungary. In 1848–1849, it was part of autonomous Serbian Vojvodina, while from 1849 to 1860 it was part of the Voivodeship of Serbia and Banat of Temeschwar. Since 1860 Inđija was again part of the Kingdom of Slavonia, which in this time was a completely separate Habsburg crownland. Kingdom of Slavonia was subsequently (in 1868) joined with the Kingdom of Croatia into newly formed Kingdom of Croatia-Slavonia, which, following the 1868 Croatian–Hungarian Settlement, became an autonomous kingdom within the Habsburg Kingdom of Hungary and Austria-Hungary.

First fairs started to take place in Inđija at the beginning of the 19th century, when the state's postal service was established. Telegraph became operational in Inđija in 1850, while postal money transfers commenced in 1886. The first bank was established in 1897, and the first trade school in 1897. The first electric plant in Inđija started with its operations in 1911.

The industrial progress in Inđija was initiated with the establishment of mills in the mid 19th century, and the first larger steam operating mill, with a capacity of 10 cars of wheat per day, was built by a company from Budapest in 1890. After the mills, the brick factories followed, while the carpentry tradition and furniture production started in 1876. At the beginning of the 20th century, a famous fur factory was established, while the spirits factory was built in 1912.

Industrial development of Inđija is largely related to the development of railroad infrastructure. The railroad reached Inđija in 1883, from two directions: from Subotica and Zagreb in the north and west respectively, continuing towards Belgrade. This has practically positioned Inđija on the crossroads of two key Balkan railroad directions.

Since 1918, Inđija was part of the Kingdom of Serbs, Croats and Slovenes (renamed to Kingdom of Yugoslavia in 1929). After the World War I, first factories were established producing anything from strollers for children, nails, jam, powdered eggs, and parachutes, to textiles and metal processing industry right after the World War II. In the first half of the 20th century Inđija became a traditional trading destination and headquarters of successful trade companies. The first modern road in Serbia the so-called "International Road" (Novi Sad–Beograd) passed through Inđija in 1939.

Prior to World War II, 5,900 of the total population of 7,900 was composed of ethnic Germans. The town was at the time one of the most developed settlements in Vojvodina, and a spiritual and cultural center of Germans in the Syrmia region.

During the World War II (1941–1944), the town was occupied by the fascist puppet state of the Independent State of Croatia. After the defeat of Axis Powers, in 1944, the German army was expelled and most of the Yugoslav Germans were forcibly removed from the country. Those who remained in Yugoslavia were sent to prison camps. After camps were abolished (in 1948), most of the remaining Yugoslav Germans were expulsed to Germany. After 1944, new migratory patterns intensified and, according to 1953 census, Inđija was mainly populated by Serbs. Population of the town increased from 7,758 in 1948 to 26,247 in 2002.

As of the 2002 census, 87.61% of the town population are Serbs. Inđija is also one of the economically most advanced Serbian municipalities, and a premium investment destination.

== Inhabited places ==
Inđija municipality includes the town of Inđija and the following villages:

- Beška
- Jarkovci
- Krčedin
- Ljukovo
- Maradik
- Novi Karlovci
- Novi Slankamen
- Slankamenački Vinogradi
- Stari Slankamen
- Čortanovci

== Demographics ==
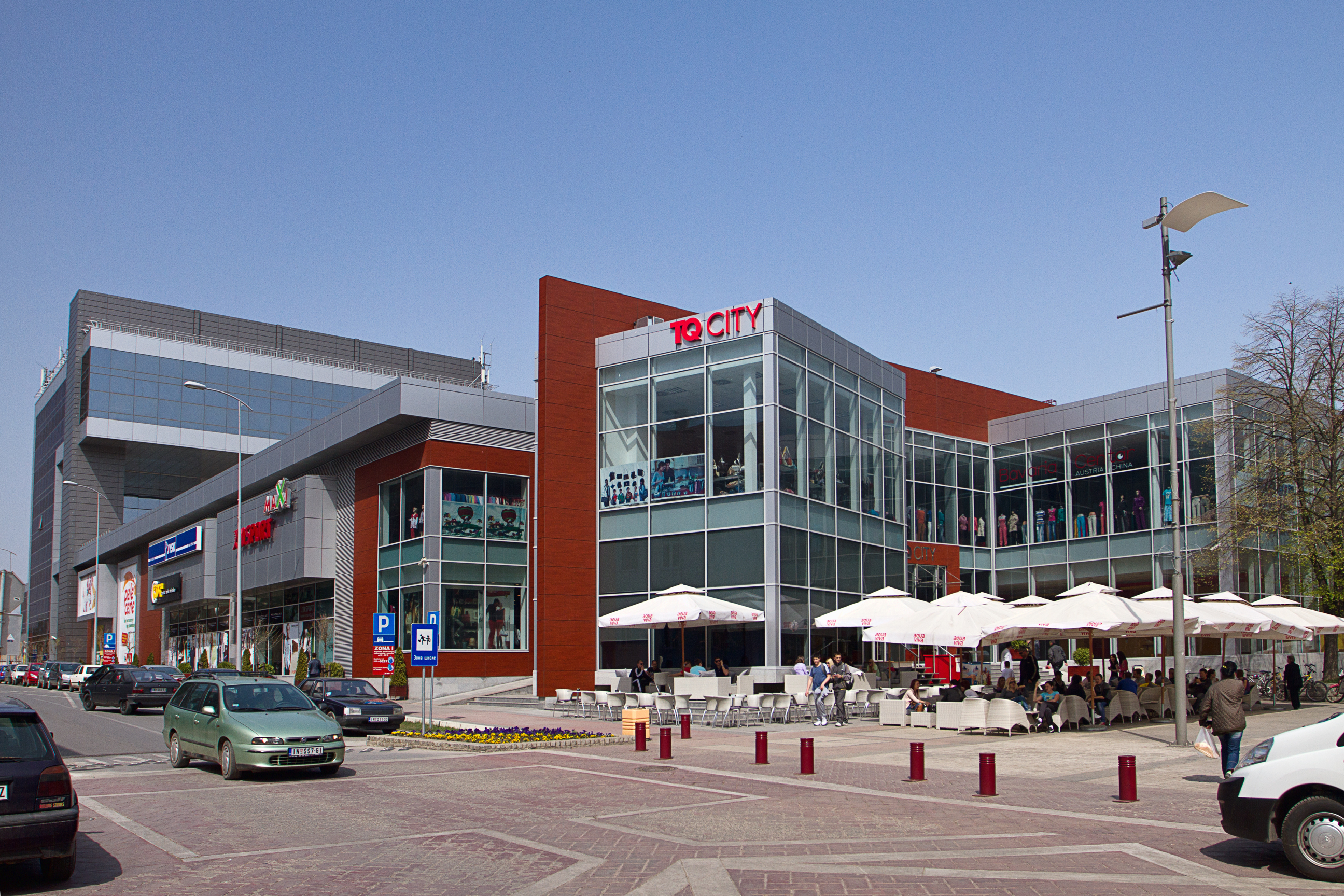
Pedestrian zone with a monumental square and TQ City

Historical population
Year	Pop.	±% p.a.
1948	27,600	—
1953	29,287	+1.19%
1961	36,484	+2.78%
1971	40,530	+1.06%
1981	44,151	+0.86%
1991	44,185	+0.01%
2002	49,609	+1.06%
2011	47,433	−0.50%

According to the 2011 census results, the municipality of Inđija has 47,433 inhabitants.

=== Ethnic groups ===
Most of the settlements in the municipality have an ethnic Serb majority. The settlement with a Slovak ethnic majority is Slankamenački Vinogradi.

The ethnic composition of the municipality:

Ethnic group	Population
Serbs	40,871
Croats	1,569
Hungarians	829
Romani	426
Ukrainians	391
Slovaks	380
Yugoslavs	210
Montenegrins	117
Macedonians	71
Slovenians	46
Russians	39
Germans	34
Muslims	19
Others	2,431
Total	47,433

== Economy ==
The following table gives a preview of total number of registered people employed in legal entities per their core activity (as of 2018):

Activity	Total
Agriculture, forestry and fishing	297
Mining and quarrying	-
Manufacturing	5,609
Electricity, gas, steam and air conditioning supply	74
Water supply; sewerage, waste management and remediation activities	283
Construction	380
Wholesale and retail trade, repair of motor vehicles and motorcycles	2,289
Transportation and storage	601
Accommodation and food services	358
Information and communication	116
Financial and insurance activities	143
Real estate activities	15
Professional, scientific and technical activities	328
Administrative and support service activities	263
Public administration and defense; compulsory social security	375
Education	612
Human health and social work activities	792
Arts, entertainment and recreation	102
Other service activities	198
Individual agricultural workers	371
Total	13,207

== Society and culture ==
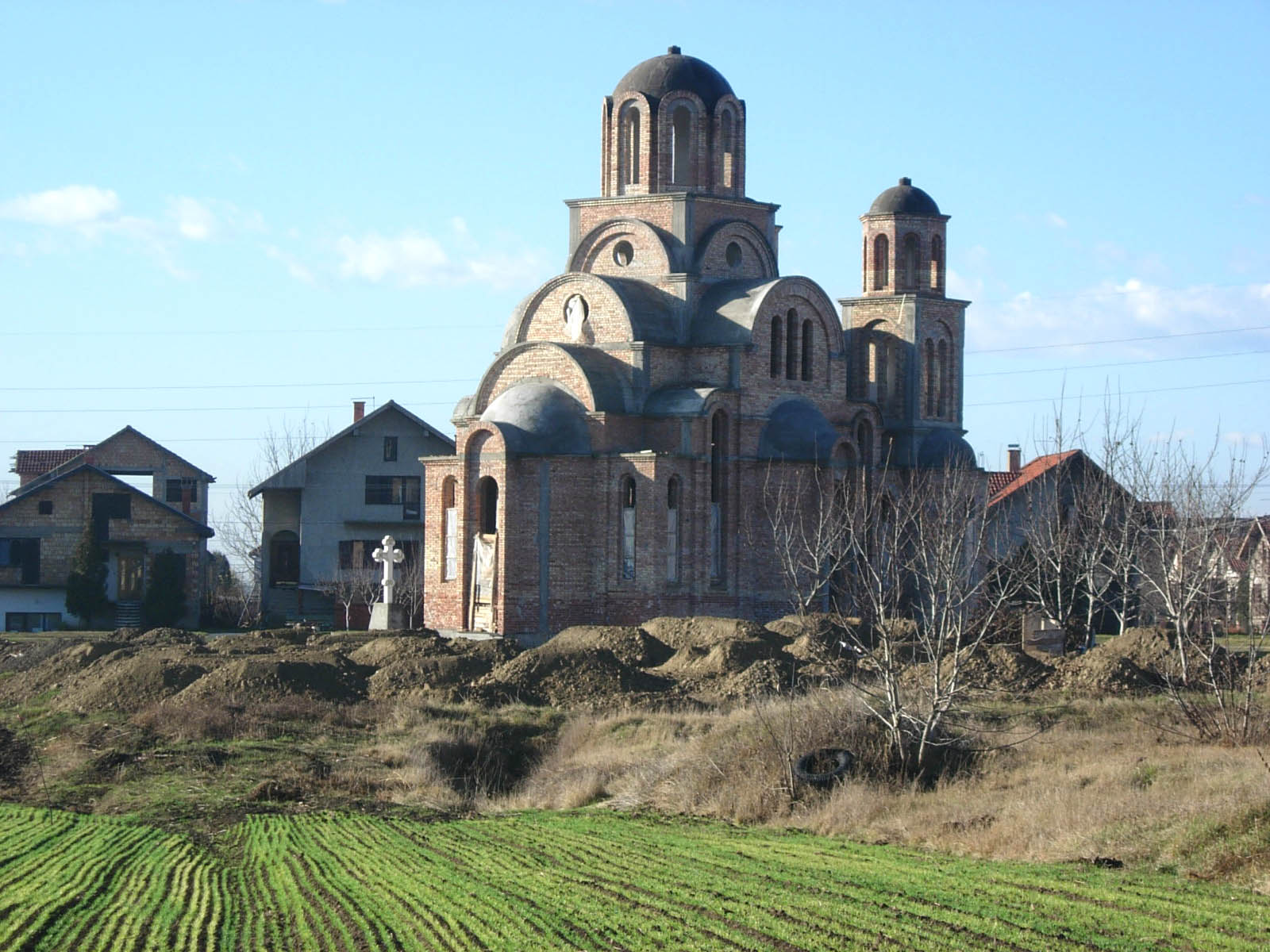
New Orthodox church

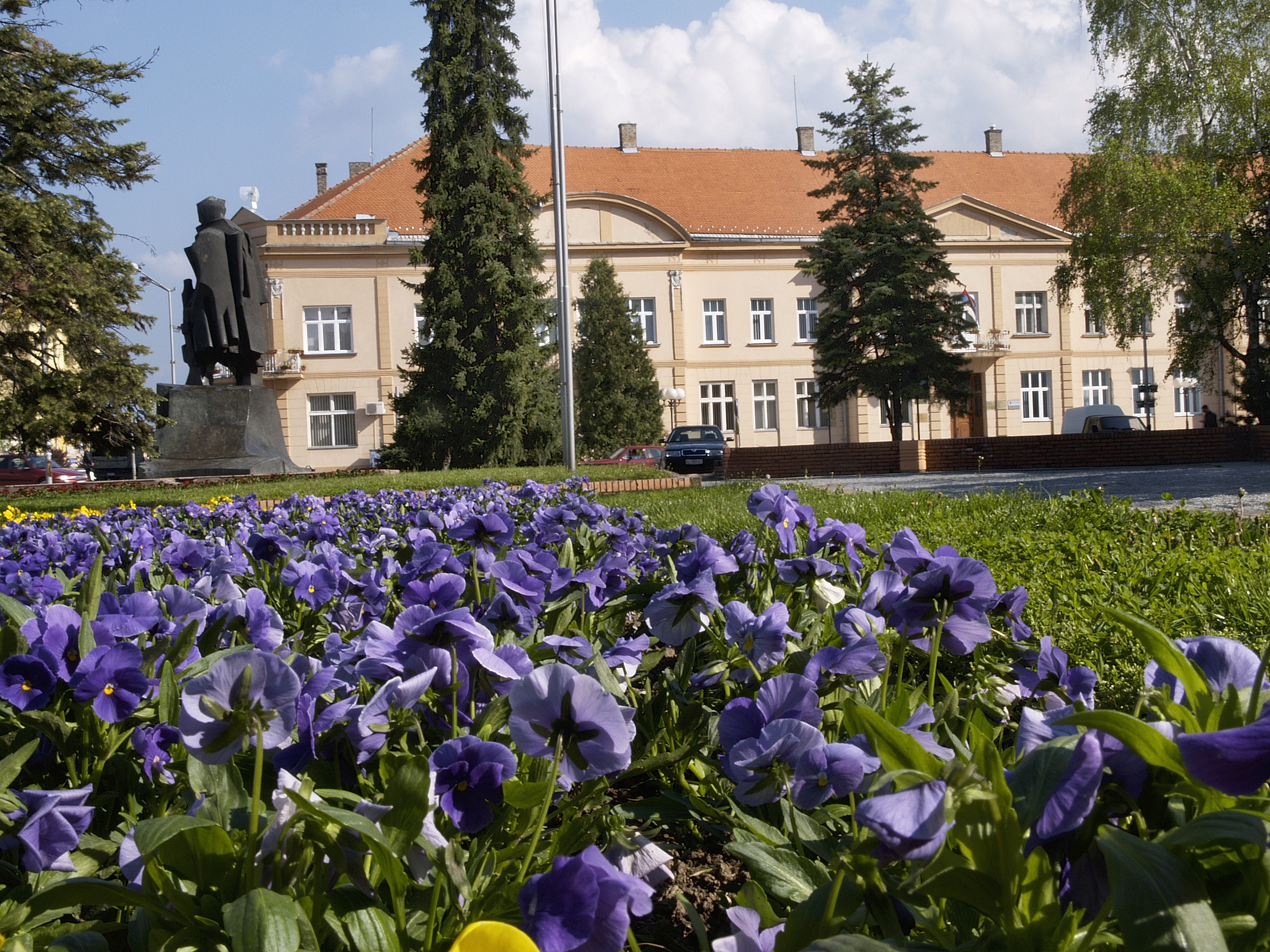
Municipality building in Indjija

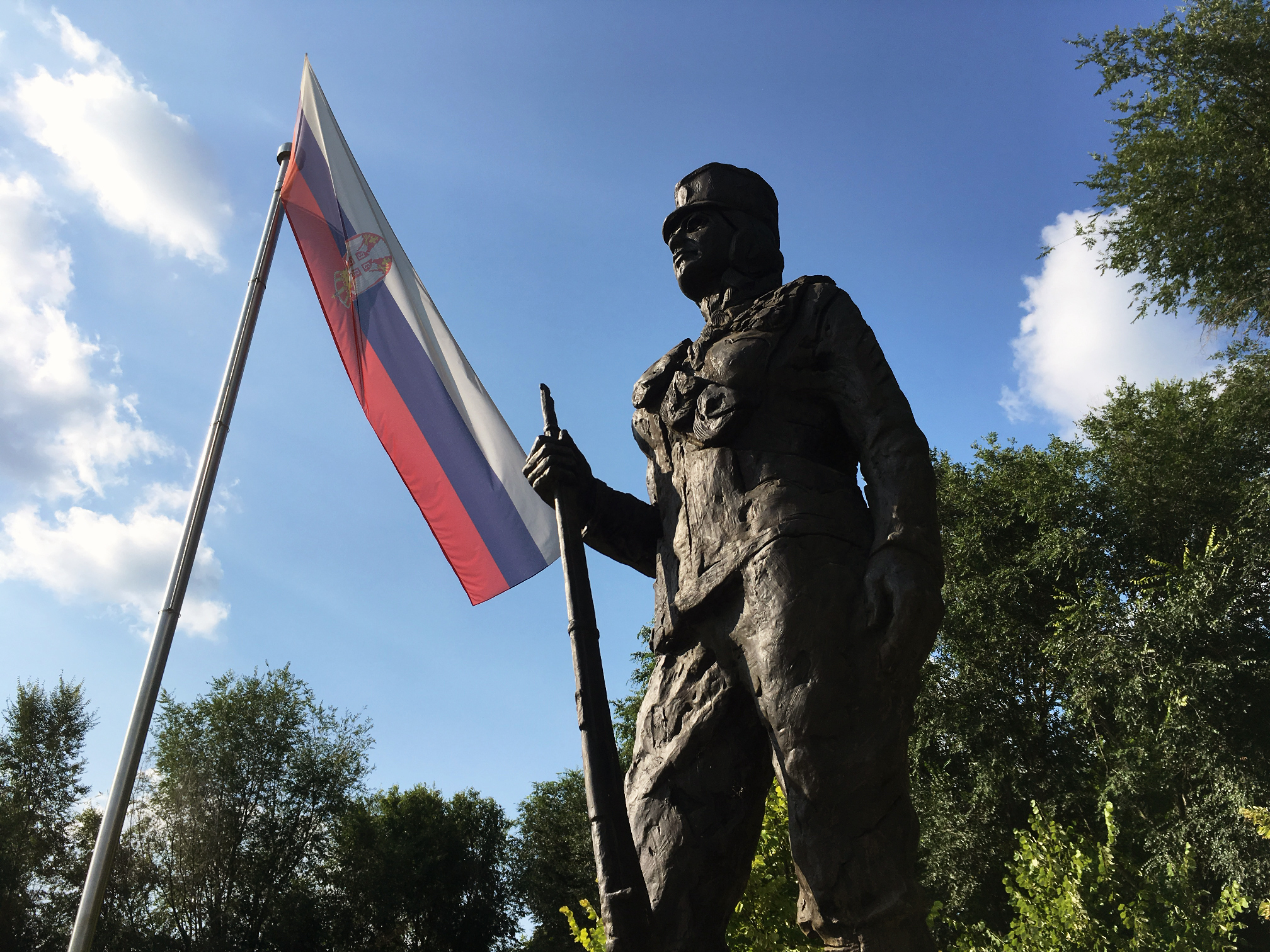
Monument dedicated to WWI hero Milunka Savić

=== Culture ===
Numerous cultural historical monuments, modern and prehistoric, are testify to the turbulent history of this region. Remains of Roman and medieval fortress and a monument to the Battle of Slankamen talk about the strategic importance of this area of the Danube, which was the border of various empires through history.

Urban core Indjija dates from the late nineteenth and early twentieth century, from the period of industrial development and the period of German nationality residents settling when building of Municipal Administration, house of Vojnovics, the Roman Catholic Church of St. Peter, the building of the presbytery and townhouses with frontage eclectically designed with elements Baroque, Classical, Renaissance and Art Nouveau were built. Somewhat earlier Church "Vavedenja presvete Bogorodice" was formed, which by its proportions, is one of the most beautiful and most suitable buildings in Srem preserved from the eighteenth century.

Some of Indija's features include its new pedestrian zone with a monumental square, a modern building of the Cultural Center, floral arrangements and street furniture.

On June 26, 2007 there was a concert of The Red Hot Chili Peppers held in Inđija. The concert lasted for about 1 hour and 20 minutes and was a part of Green Fest. Around 90,000 to 100,000 people, many of them from neighbouring countries, came to see one of today's most popular bands.

=== Sport ===
Inđija has a football club FK Inđija competed in the Serbian First League and an American football club Inđija Indians competing in the SAAF league. Woman handball club ŽRK Železničar Inđija finished sixth in Handball Super League of Serbia for Woman. Basketball club named Železničar is currently playing in third division, but has participated in Basketball League of Serbia in 2011–12 season.

Indjija was elected as one of the hosts of the 2009 Summer Universiade, which was held in Serbia in July 2009.

=== Education ===
Indjija has 10 elementary school, 3 middle schools and Faculty of Technical Sciences(Novi Sad) Department for Software Engineering

Elementary schools

- Dušan Jerković
- Petar Kočić
- Jovan Popović
- Braća Grulović - Beška
- Branko Radičević - Maradik
- Dr Đorđe Natošević - Novi Slankamen
- Ruža Đurđević Crna, Čortanovci
- Slobodan Bajić Paja, Novi Karlovci
- 22. jul, Krčedin
- Petar Kočić - Ljukovo

Middle Schools

- Technical School Mihajlo Pupin
- Đorđe Natošević School
- Gymnasium (Gimnazija) Indjija

=== Religion ===
Inđija has two main churches: Serbian Orthodox Church (from 1756) and Roman Catholic Church (from 1867−1872). There is also a new Orthodox church. Smaller, home-based, Protestant congregations also exist.

== Notable people ==
- Arsenije Sremac, the second Archbishop of the Serbian Orthodox Church
- Nenad Bogdanović, Mayor of Belgrade
- George Seitz, Australian politician
- Zoran Janković, Bulgarian football player
- Slobodan Popović, middle distance runner, Universiade champion
- Miroslav Raduljica, basketball player, silver medalist at the 2016 Summer Olympics and 2014 FIBA World Cup
- Bojan Banjac, football player for Lille OSC
- Milan Bubalo, football player
- Dejan Georgijević, football player
- Srđan Dimitrov, football player
- Darko Lemajić, football player
- Bojan Dubajić, football player
- Vladimir Tintor, football player
- Goran Ješić, politician

== Twin towns – sister cities ==
Inđija is twinned with:

- Gevgelija, North Macedonia
- Jablanica, Bosnia and Herzegovina
- Ohrid, North Macedonia
- Paderno Dugnano, Italy
- Elektrėnai, Lithuania
- Al-Salt, Jordan

== See also ==
- Syrmia
- Syrmia District
- List of cities, towns and villages in Vojvodina
- List of places in Serbia
- Church of the Presentation of the Theotokos, Inđija
