= Golubinci =

Golubinci Голубинци (Serbian)
- Village (Selo)
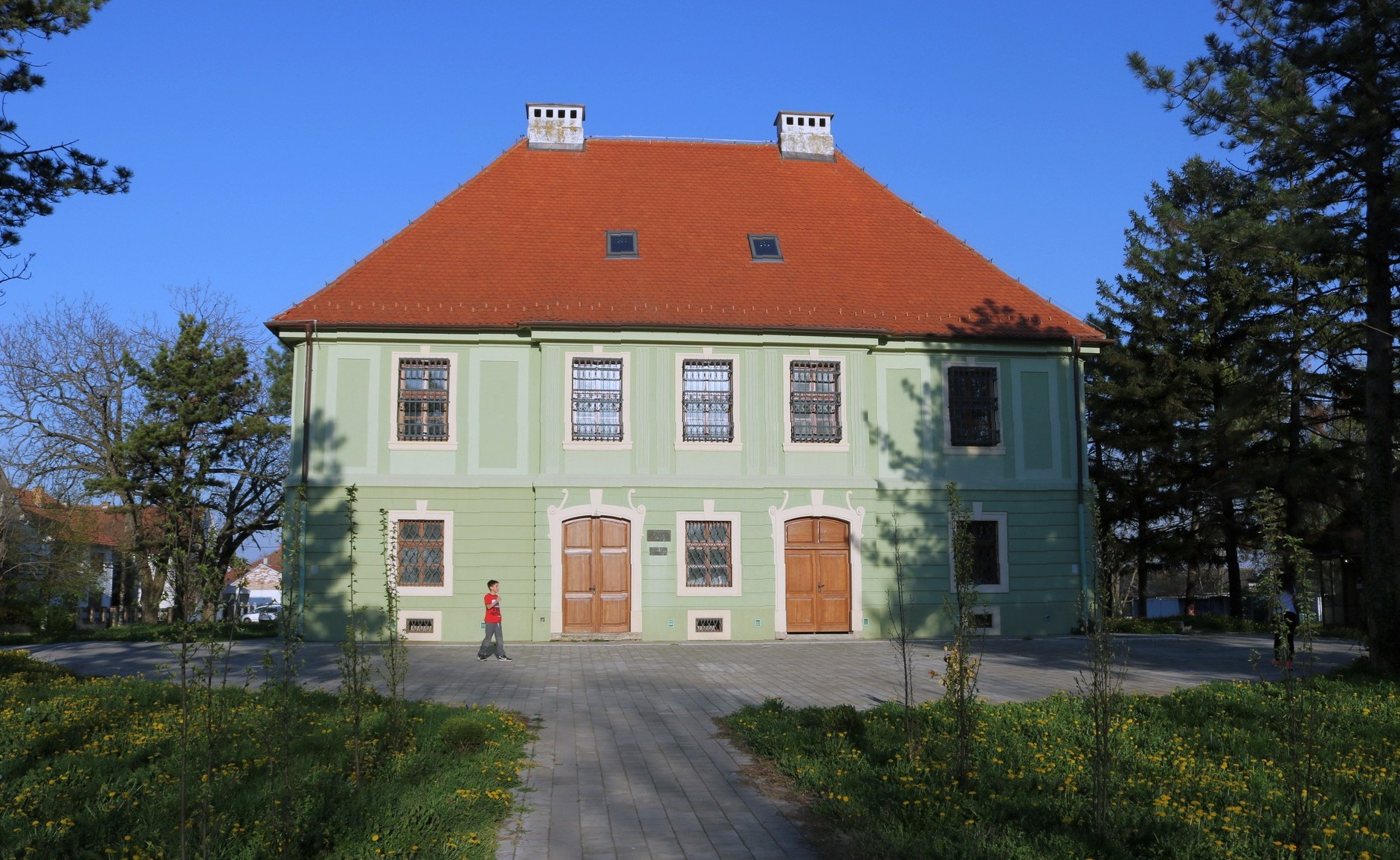
- Interactive map of Golubinci
- Location within Vojvodina Location within Serbia Location within Europe
- Coordinates: 44°59′N 20°04′E
- Country: Serbia
- Province: Vojvodina
- Region: Syrmia
- District: Srem
- Municipality: Stara Pazova

Population (2011)
  - Total: 4,721
- Time zone: UTC+1 (CET)
  - Summer (DST): UTC+2 (CEST)

Golubinci (Serbian Cyrillic: Голубинци) is a village in Serbia. It is situated in the Stara Pazova municipality. The village has a Serb ethnic majority and Croat minority and its population numbering 4,721 people (2011 census).

== Name ==
The name of the settlement in Serbian is plural.

== See also ==
- List of places in Serbia
- List of cities, towns and villages in Vojvodina
