= Putinci =

Putinci Путинци (Serbian)
- Village (Selo)
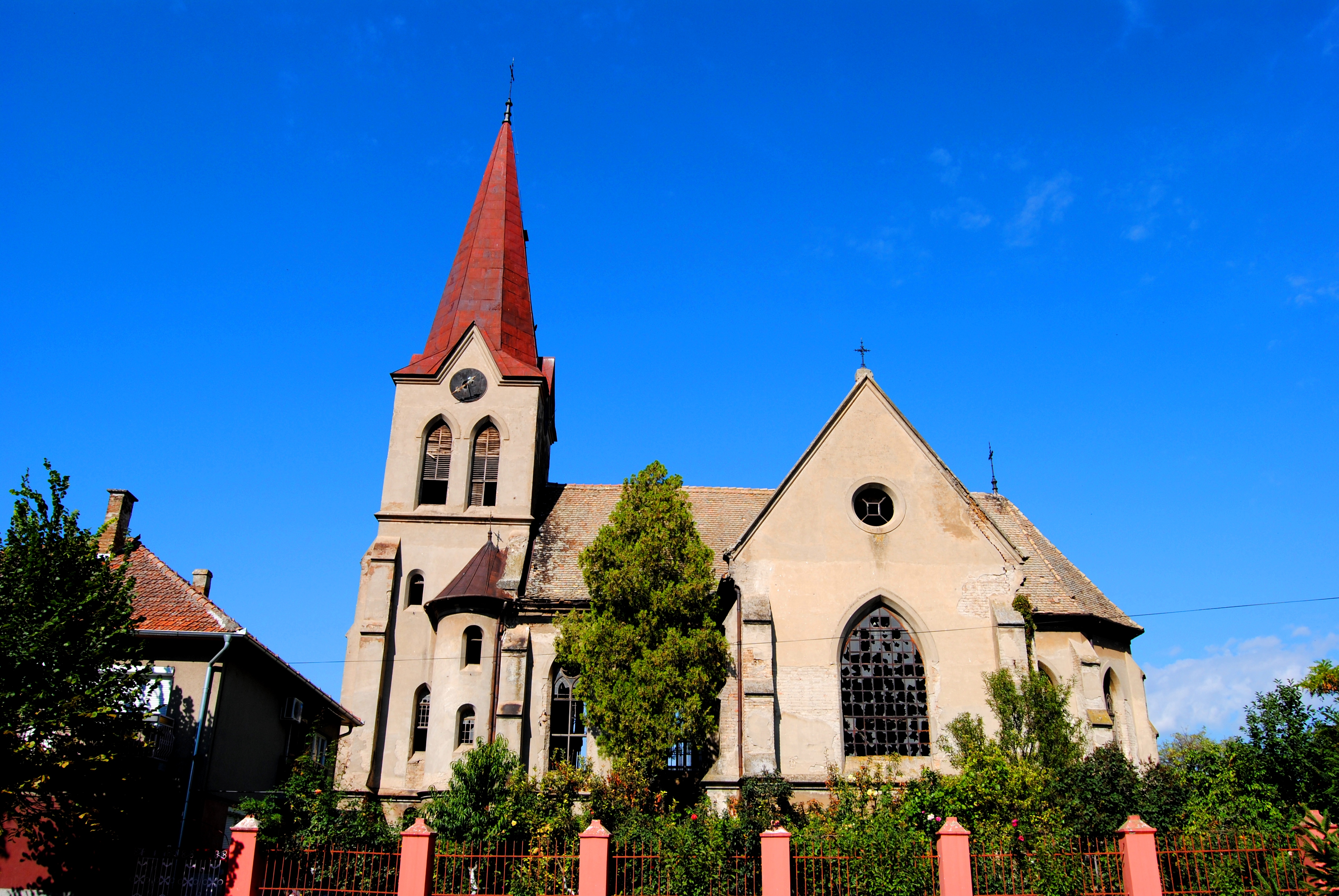

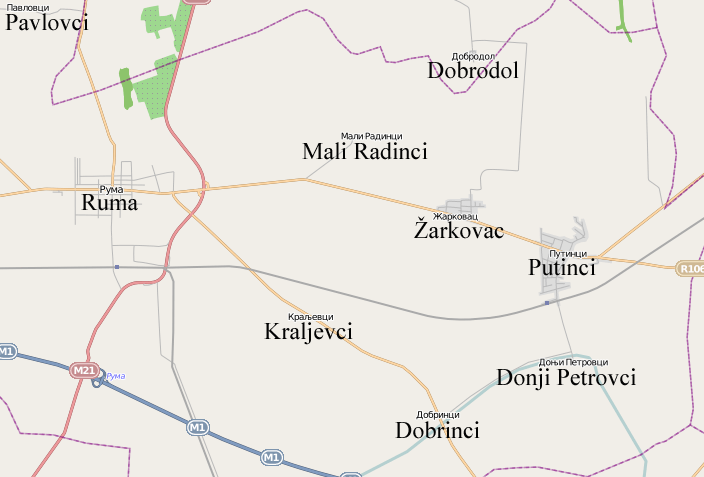
- Map of Putinci and other settlements in the neighborhood.

- Location within Vojvodina Location within Serbia Location within Europe
- Coordinates: 45°00′N 19°58′E
- Country: Serbia
- Province: Vojvodina
- Region: Syrmia
- District: Srem
- Municipality: Ruma

Population (2002)
  - Total: 3,244
- Time zone: UTC+1 (CET)
  - Summer (DST): UTC+2 (CEST)

Putinci (Serbian Cyrillic: Путинци) is a village in Serbia. It is situated in the Ruma municipality, in the Srem District, Vojvodina province. The village has a Serb ethnic majority and its population numbering 3,244 people (2002 census).

== Name ==
The name of the town in Serbian is plural.

== Historical population ==
- 1961: 3,029
- 1971: 2,938
- 1981: 3,075
- 1991: 2,890
- 2002: 3,244

== See also ==
- List of places in Serbia
- List of cities, towns and villages in Vojvodina

== Gallery ==
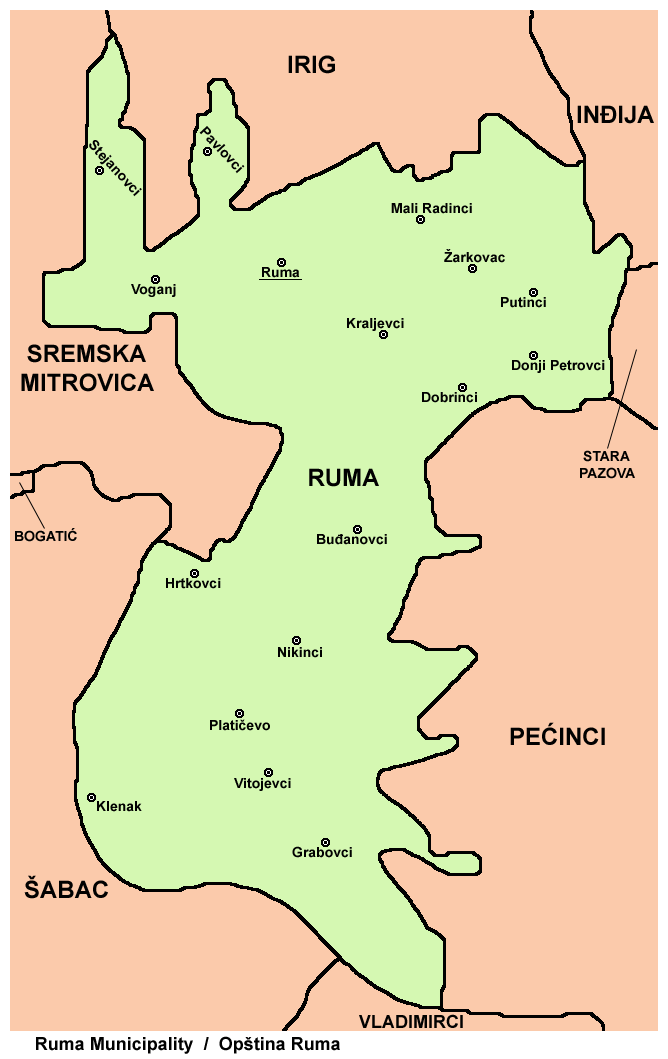
Map of the Ruma municipality, showing the location of Putinci

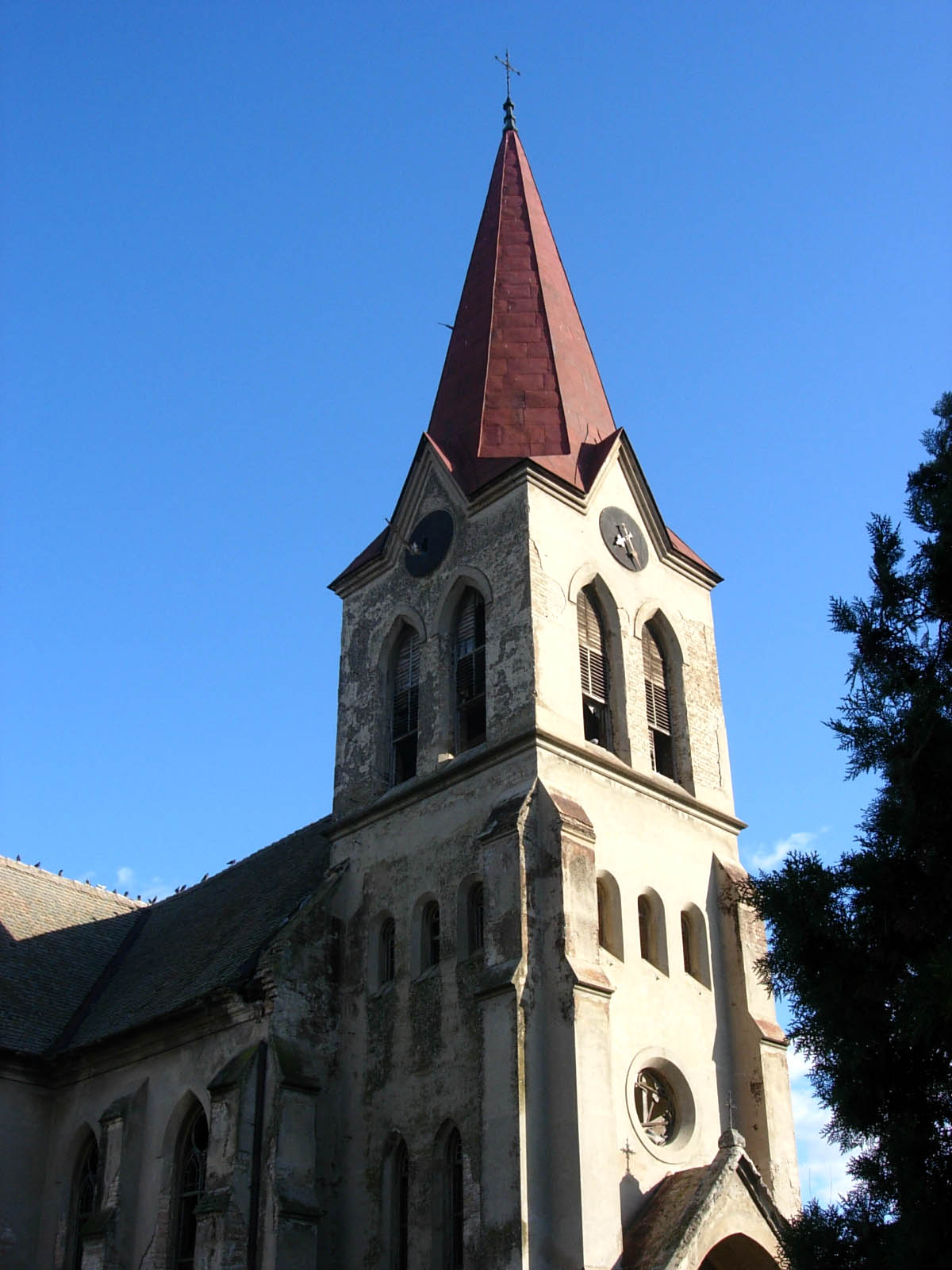
The Catholic Church St. Nepomuk. Built in 18 century by Donauschwaben.
