= Rascians =

Historical exonym for Serbs

Rascians (Serbian: Раши, Рашани / Raši, Rašani; Latin: Rasciani, Natio Rasciana) was a historical term for Serbs. The term was derived from the Latinized name for the central Serbian region of Raška (Latin: Rascia; Serbian Cyrillic: Рашка). In medieval and early modern Western sources, exonym Rascia was often used as a designation for Serbian lands in general, and consequently the term Rasciani became one of the most common designations for Serbs. Because of the increasing migratory concentration of Serbs in the southern Pannonian Plain, since the late 15th century, those regions also became referred to as Rascia, since they were largely inhabited by Rasciani (Rascians). Among those regions, term Rascia (Raška) was most frequently used for territories spanning from western Banat to central Slavonia, including the regions of Syrmia, Bačka, and southern Baranja. From the 16th to the 18th century, those regions were contested between the Ottoman Empire and the Habsburg monarchy, and today they belong to several modern countries (Serbia, Romania, Hungary, Croatia).

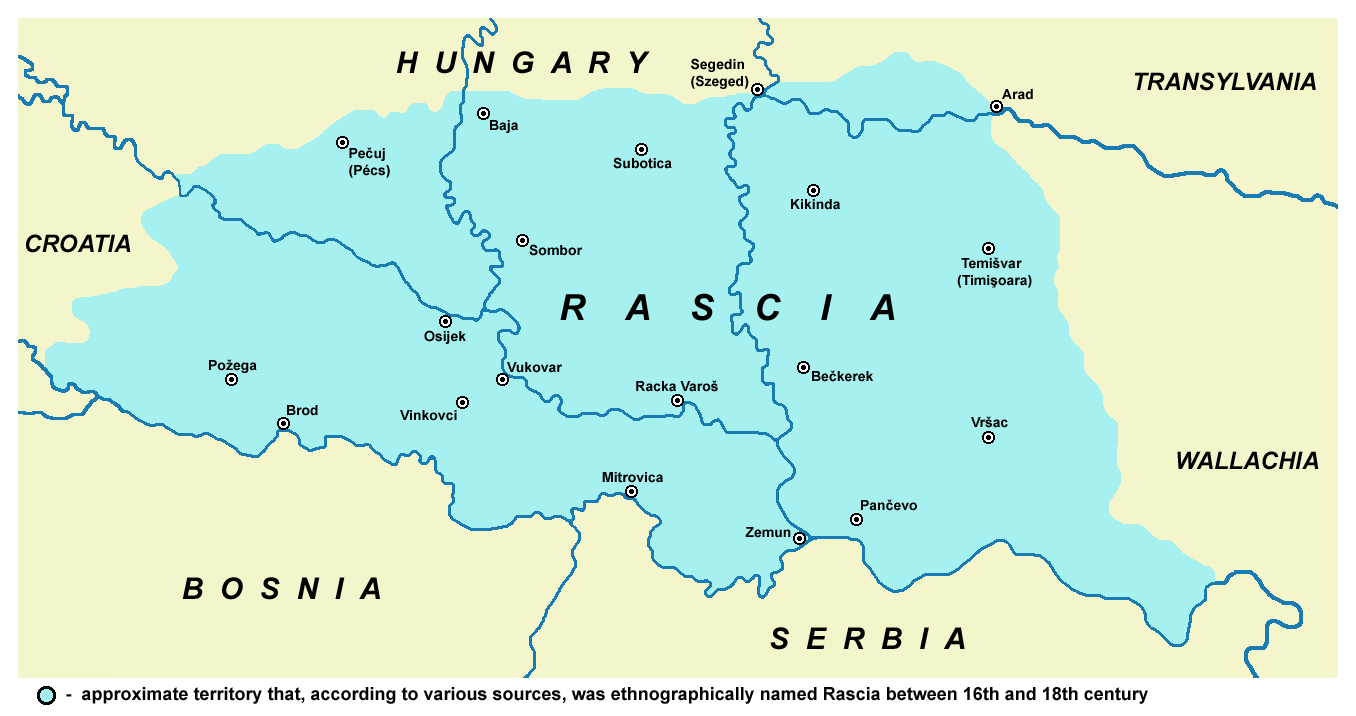
Approximate territory, according to various sources, ethnographically identified as new "Rascia" between the 16th and 18th centuries

== Etymology ==
The demonym Latin: Rasciani, Natio Rasciana; Serbian: Рашани/Rašani, Раши/Raši and Раци/Raci, Расцијани/Rascijani; Hungarian: Rác, (pl.) Rácok; German: Ratzen, Raize, (pl.) Raizen, anglicized as "Rascians". The name, primarily used by Hungarians and Germans, derived from the pars pro toto "Raška" (Rascia), a medieval Serbian region. The territory inhabited primarily by the Serbs in the Habsburg monarchy was called Latin: Rascia; Serbian: Raška/Рашка; Hungarian: Ráczság, Ráczország, rácz tartomány,; German: Ratzenland, Rezenland.

== History ==
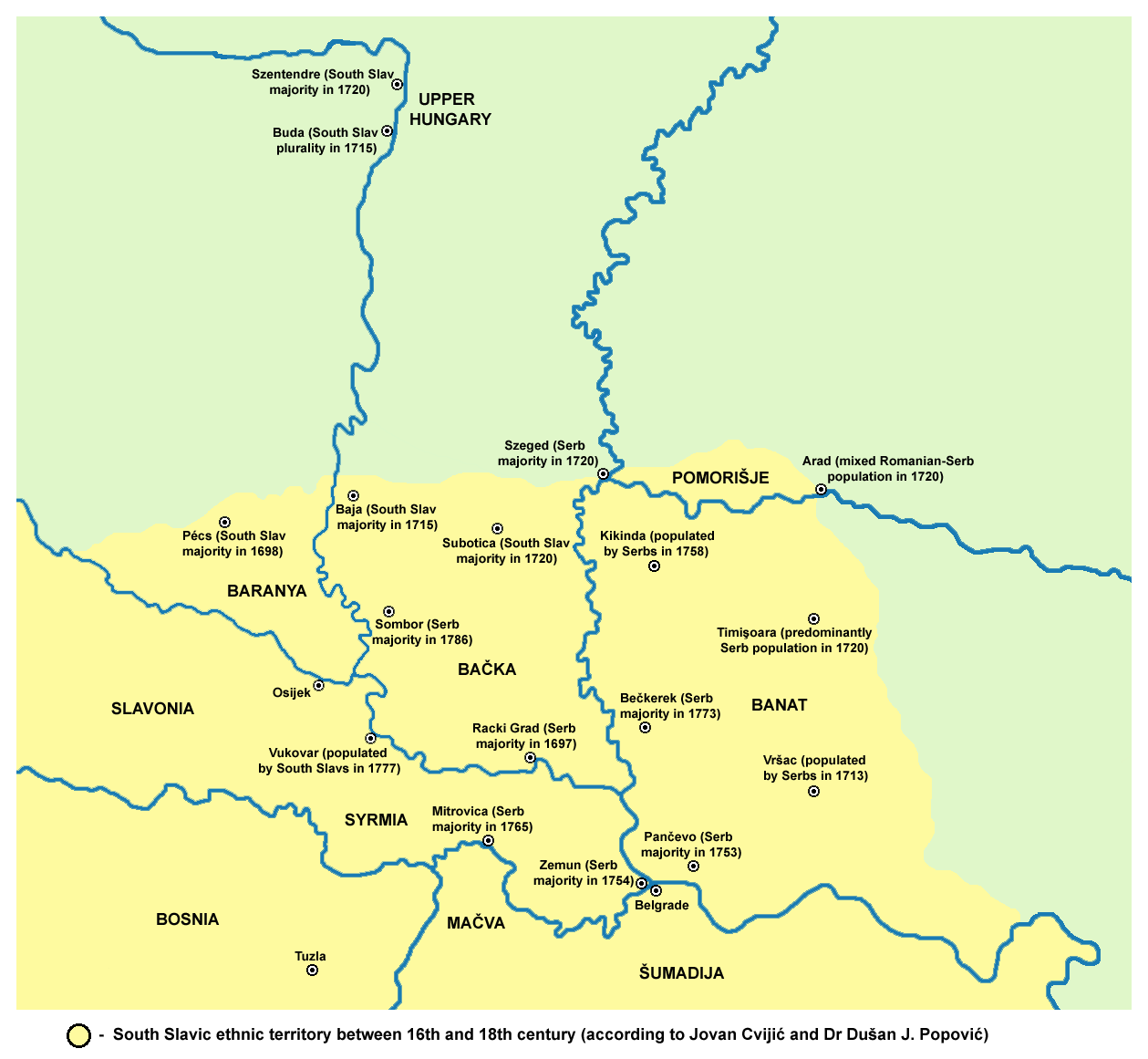
Ethnic territory of the Serbs and other South Slavs in the Pannonian Plain between the 16th and 18th centuries (according to Jovan Cvijić and Dušan J. Popović)

The defeats at the hand of the Ottoman Empire in the late 14th century forced the Serbs to rely on the neighbouring states, especially Hungary. After the Ottoman conquest of Serbian territories in 1439, Despot Đurađ Branković fled to the Kingdom of Hungary where he was given a large territory in southern Pannonia, while his son Grgur ruled Serbia as an Ottoman vassal until his removal in 1441. Đurađ's daughter Katarina of Celje (1434–56) held Slavonia. Having picked the losing side in the Hungarian civil war, the Branković dynasty were stripped of their estates in Hungary upon Matthias Corvinus' coronation in 1458. Left on its own, the Serbian Despotate lost the capital, Smederevo, to the Ottomans in 1459. Serbs migrated to Bosnia, Herzegovina, and Zeta, and in larger numbers to Hungary, where the immigrants were well-received. Many Hungarians left the frontier for the safer interior, leaving the southern Hungarian kingdom almost abandoned. The settlement of Serbs in Syrmia, Bačka, Banat and Pomorišje strengthened the Hungarian hold of these sparse areas, most exposed to Ottoman expansion.

Following the Ottoman conquest, a large part of the Serbian nobility were killed, while what survived crossed into Hungary, bringing their subjects, including many farmer families, with them. Matthias Corvinus complained in a letter from 1462 that 200,000 peoples during the previous three years had been taken from his country by Turks, this information was used as a reference for Serbian migration to Hungary. King Matthias won over Vuk Grgurević in 1465 and proclaimed him a duke over Serbs in Syrmia and the surroundings, which intensified Serb migration; showing his military prowess with bands of Serb warriors, Vuk was proclaimed Serbian Despot in 1471 (thereby restoring the title). The Serbian Despot's army participated in the Ottoman-Hungarian Wars, penetrating into Ottoman territory, which saw large numbers of Serbs retreating with the Hungarian army. A letter of King Matthias from 12 January 1483 mentions that 200,000 Serbs had settled the Hungarian kingdom in the last four years. Despot Vuk and his warriors were greatly rewarded with estates, also including places in Croatia. Also, by this time, the Jakšić family had become increasingly notable, and held estates stretching over several counties in the kingdom. The territory of Vuk Grgurević (1471–85), the Serbian Despot in Hungarian service (as "Despot of the Kingdom of Rascia"), was called "Little Rascia".

Since the 15th century, the Serbs made up a large percentage of the population on the territory of present-day Vojvodina. Because of this, many historical sources and maps, which were written and drawn between 15th and 18th centuries, mention the territory under the names of Rascia (Raška, Serbia) and Little Rascia (Mala Raška, Little Serbia).

=== Between Ottomans and Habsburgs ===
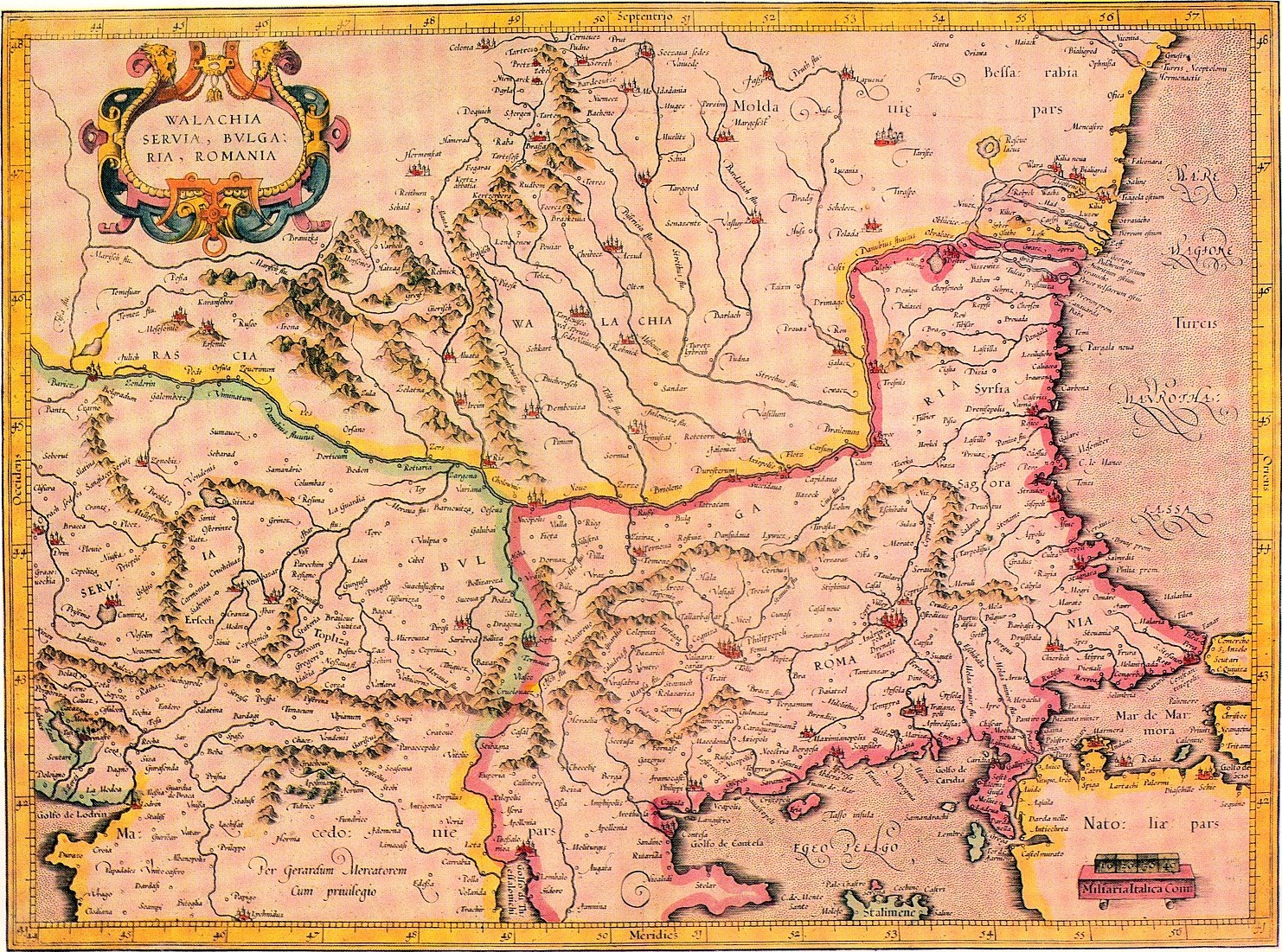
The Map of Gerardus Mercator from 1590, using the name "Rascia" as designation for the region of Banat

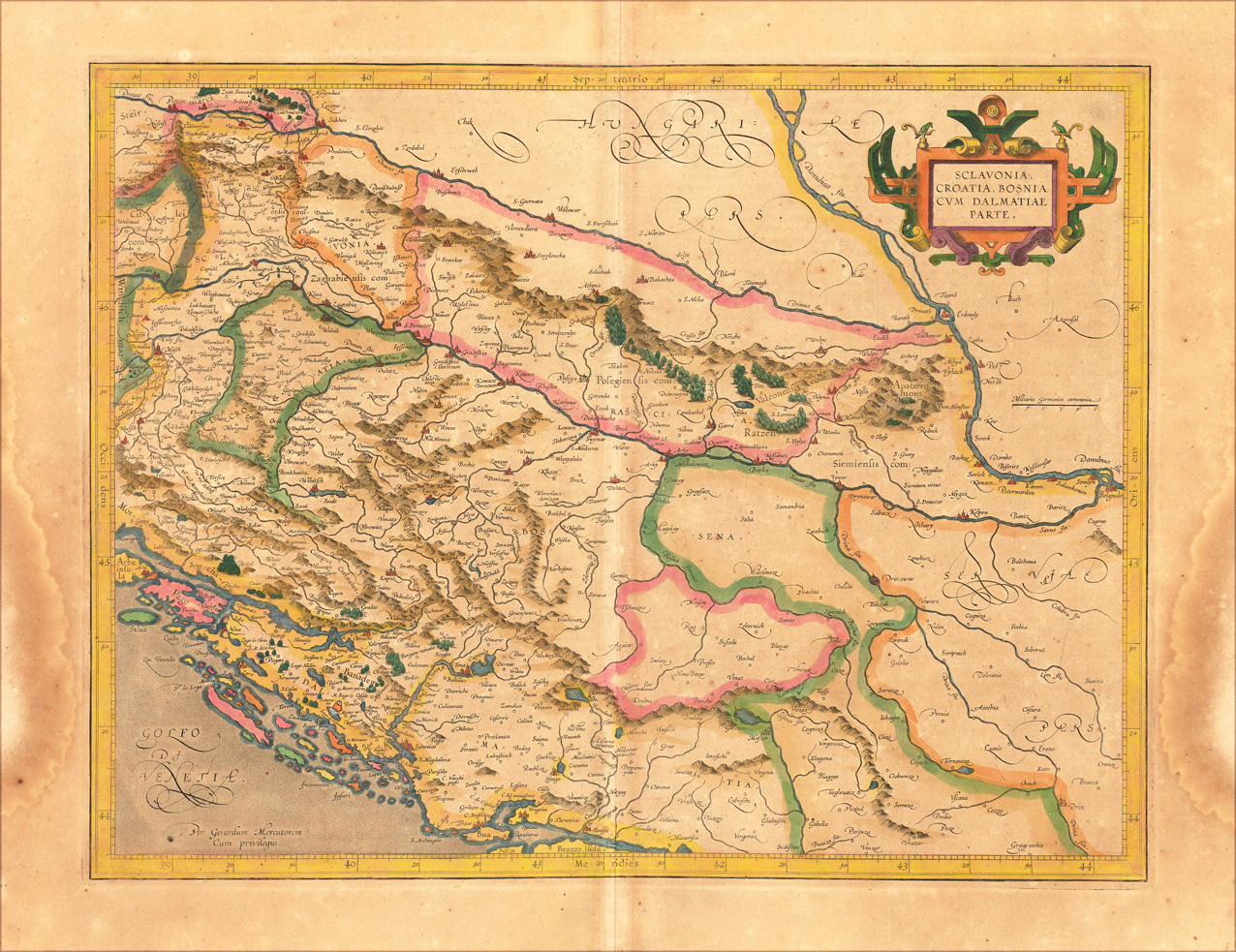
Map from 1609, using the name "Rascia" as designation for the region of lower Slavonia

After 1526, many Serbs (called "Rascians") settled in Slavonia. In 1526–27, Jovan Nenad ruled a territory of southern Pannonia during the Hungarian throne struggle; After his death (1527), his commander Radoslav Čelnik ruled Syrmia as an Ottoman and Habsburg vassal until 1532, when he retreated to Slavonia with the Ottoman conquest. Many of the Syrmian Serbs then settled the Kingdom of Hungary.

A 1542 document describes that "Serbia" stretched from Lipova and Timișoara to the Danube, while a 1543 document that Timișoara and Arad being located "in the middle of Rascian land" (in medio Rascianorum). At that time, the majority language in the region between Mureș and Körös was indeed Serbian. Apart from Serbian being the main language of the Banat population, there were 17 Serbian monasteries active in Banat at that time. The territory of Banat had received a Serbian character and was called "Little Rascia".

In early 1594, the Serbs in Banat rose up against the Ottomans, during the Long Turkish War (1593–1606) which was fought at the Austrian-Ottoman border in the Balkans. The Serbian patriarchate and rebels had established relations with foreign states, and had in a short time captured several towns, including Vršac, Bečkerek, Lipova, Titel and Bečej. The rebels had, in the character of a holy war, carried war flags with the icon of Saint Sava, the founder of the Serbian Orthodox Church and an important figure in medieval Serbia. The war banners had been consecrated by Patriarch Jovan Kantul, and the uprising had been aided by Serbian Orthodox metropolitans Rufim Njeguš of Cetinje and Visarion of Trebinje.

Because of the substantial number of Serbs (Rascians), who belonged to the Ottoman social and fiscal category of vlachs (Serbian: власи) parts of the Sanjak of Pakrac and Sanjak of Požega were also referred to as Mala Vlaška (English: Little Vlachia). In the 17th and early 18th century, the territory of lower Slavonia was called Mala Raška (English: Little Raška), due to its large number of Serbs. In 17th-century Habsburg usage, the term "Rascian" referred most commonly to the Serbs who lived in Habsburg-controlled territory, then more generally to Orthodox Serbs, wherever they lived, and then more generally still to speakers of Serbian language. Throughout the 17th century, former counties of Požega, Baranya and Syrmia were often mentioned as "Rácország" (Hungarian term for the region of Rascians).

The Emperor's so-called "Invitatorium" in April 1690, for example, was addressed to Arsenije III as "Patriarch of the Rascians", but Austrian court style also distinguished between "Catholic Rascians" and "Orthodox Rascians". In 1695, Emperor Leopold issued a protective diploma for Patriarch Arsenije and the Serb people, whom he called "popolum Servianum" and "Rasciani seu Serviani".

=== 18th century ===
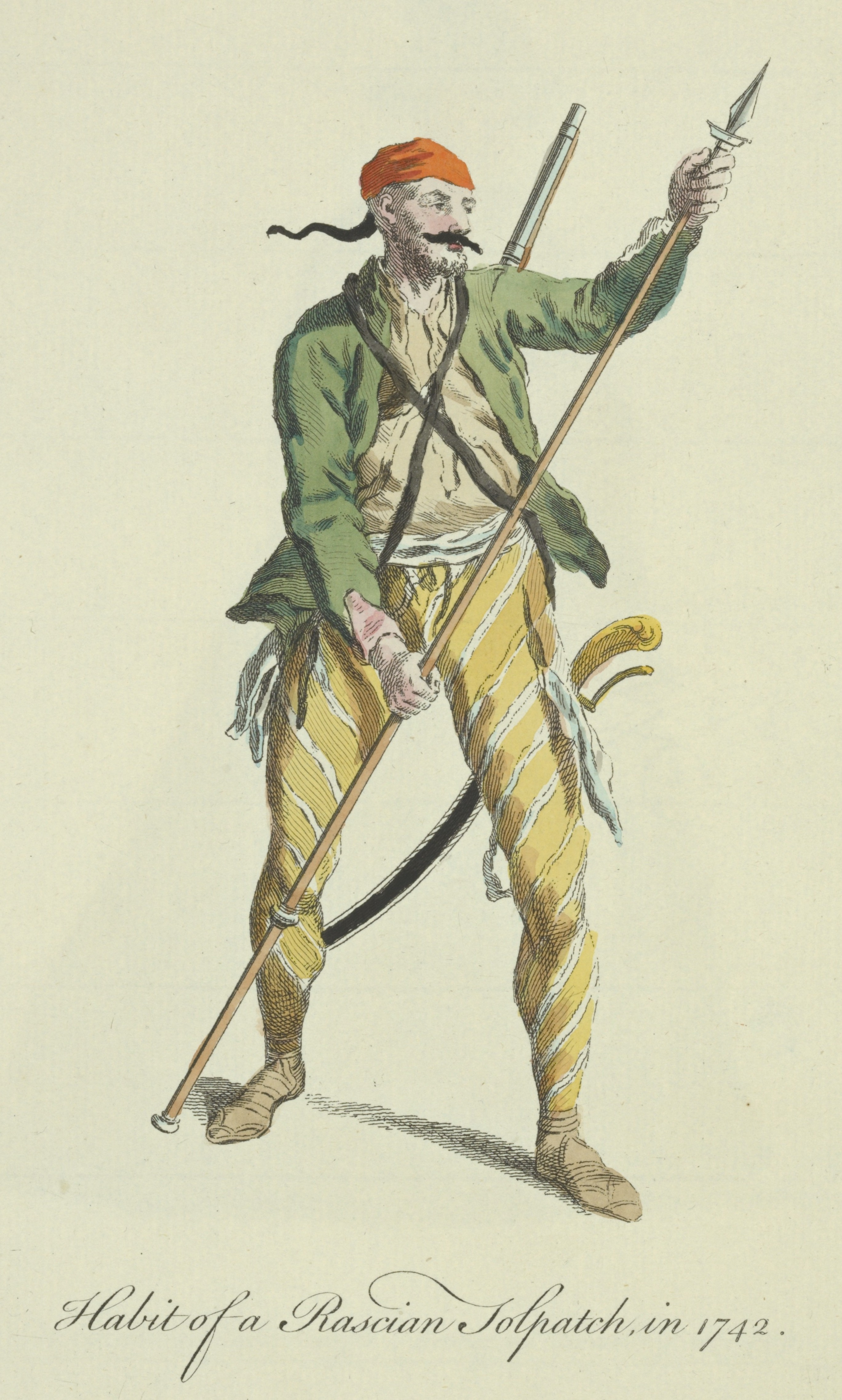
The Uniform of a Rascian (Serbian) Light Infantryman (Tolpatch) in 1742 published by Thomas Jefferys in London

In official Habsburg documents from the 18th century the Serbs of Habsburg Monarchy were mentioned as Rasciani ("Rascians"), Natio Rasciana ("Rascian nation"), Illyri ("Illyrians") and Natio Illyrica ("Illyrian nation").

During the Kuruc War (1703–1711) of Francis II Rakoczi, the territory of present-day Vojvodina was a battlefield between Hungarian rebels and local Serbs who fought on the side of the Habsburg Emperor. Darvas, the prime military commander of the Hungarian rebels, which fought against Serbs in Bačka, wrote: We burned all large places of Rascia, on the both banks of the rivers Danube and Tisa.

=== 1801–48 ===
When the representatives of the Vojvodinian Serbs negotiated with the Hungarian leader Lajos Kossuth in 1848, they asked him not to call them Raci, because they regard this name insulting, since they had their national and historical endonym – Serbs.

The initial name of the city of Novi Sad, Ratzen Stadt (Rascian/Serb City) derived from the name. The Tabán quarter of Budapest was also called Rácváros in the 18th-19th centuries due to its significant Serb population.

Since the 19th century, the term Rascians is no longer used.

== Religion ==
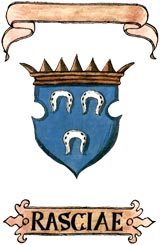
Imaginary Coat of arms of Rascia, from the Fojnica Armorial

After the Great Serb Migration, the Eparchy of Karlovac and Zrinopolje was established in 1695, the first metropolitan being Atanasije Ljubojević, the exiled metropolitan of Dabar and Bosnia.

== Catholic Rascians (Bunjevci and Šokci) ==
In a wider perspective, the term was also used for some other related South Slavic groups of the Habsburg Monarchy, such as the Catholic Bunjevci and Šokci (designated as "Catholic Rascians"). Catholic Rascians are also called "Papal Rascians" (hu. Pápista Rácok) in some Hungarian historical sources. Other sources as well referred to them as "Rasciani Catolichi" or "Catholische Ratzen". They were distinguished by their religion as the "Catholic Rascians" Dalmatians, or as they are today called Bunjevci (which means they were originally from Dalmatia). In 1945, the Yugoslav communist authorities classified Bunjevci and Šokci as Croats in official records, denying recognition of them as a separate ethnic group and possibility of self-declaration. Following the dissolution of Yugoslavia, Bunjevci in Serbia regained official recognition as a separate minority community and were again able to declare their identity independently in censuses and public institutions. In Hungary some Rascians identify as Croats, mostly in villages of Tököl (Tukulja), Bátya (Baćin) and Dusnok (Dušnok) where they call themselves Rac.

== Legacy ==
There is a Hungarian surname, Rác.

== See also ==
- Serbs of Vojvodina
- Serbian Vojvodina
- History of Vojvodina
- History of Serbia
- History of the Serbs
- Eparchy of Požega
- Eparchy of Temišvar
- Serbs of Croatia
- Serbs of Romania
- Serbs of Hungary
- Serbian Militia
- Serbian Free Corps

== Maps ==
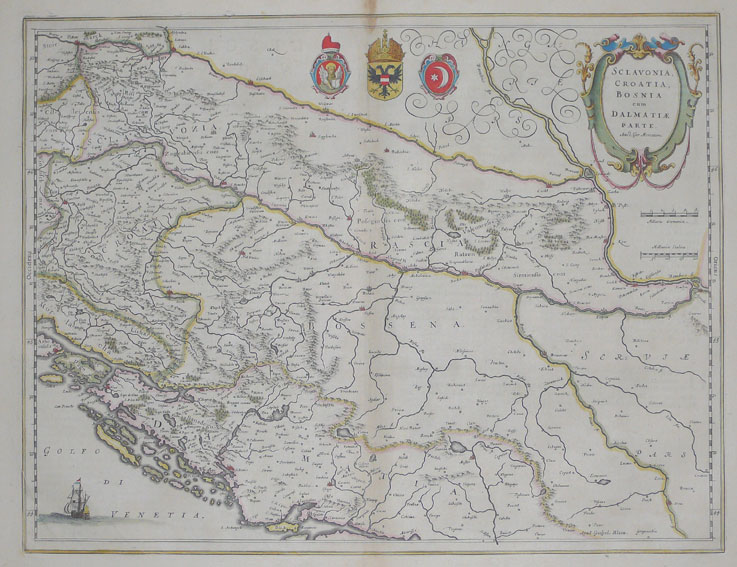
Map from 1643–50, showing name Rascia in Slavonia

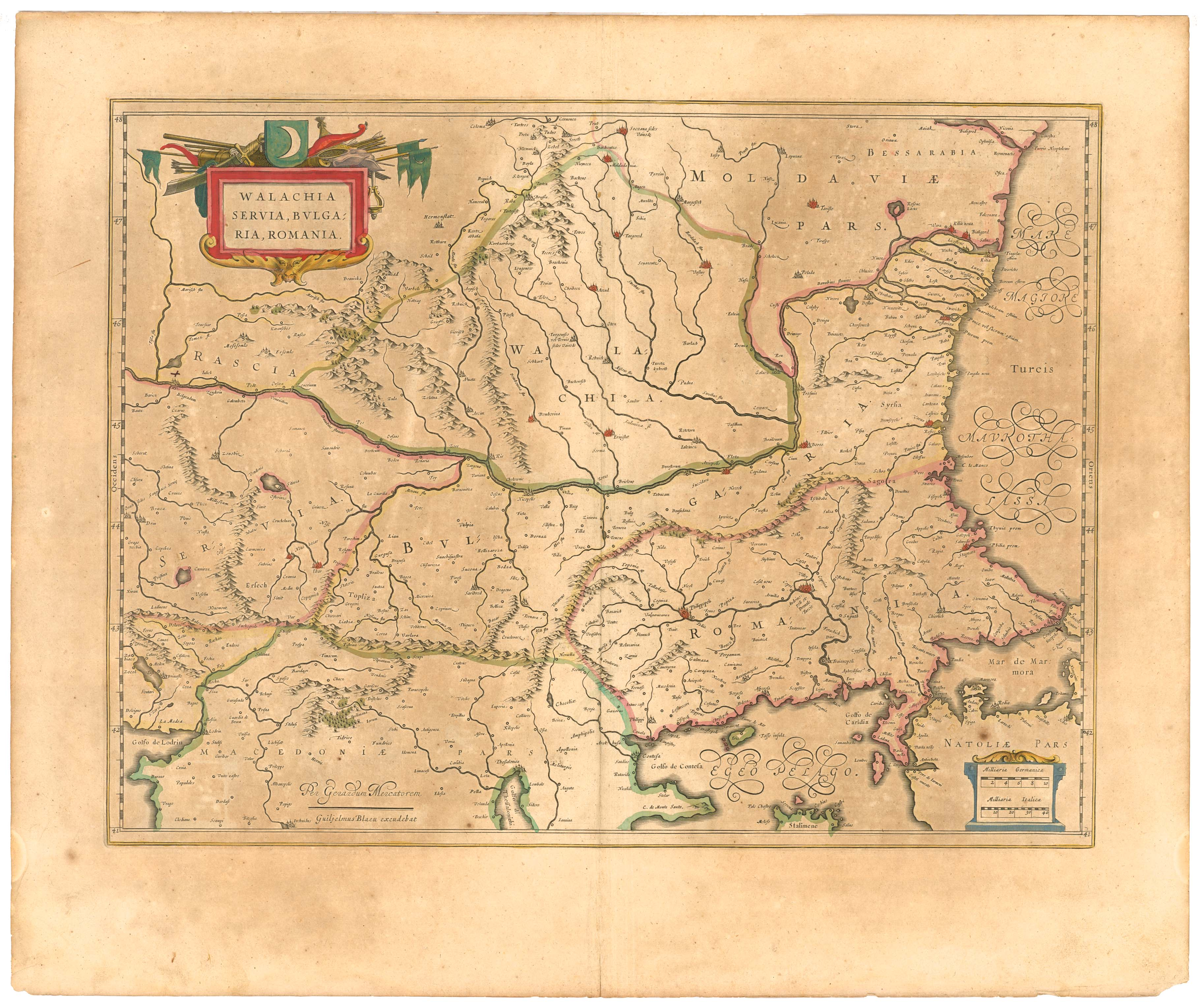
Map from 1645, in which name Rascia is located in Banat

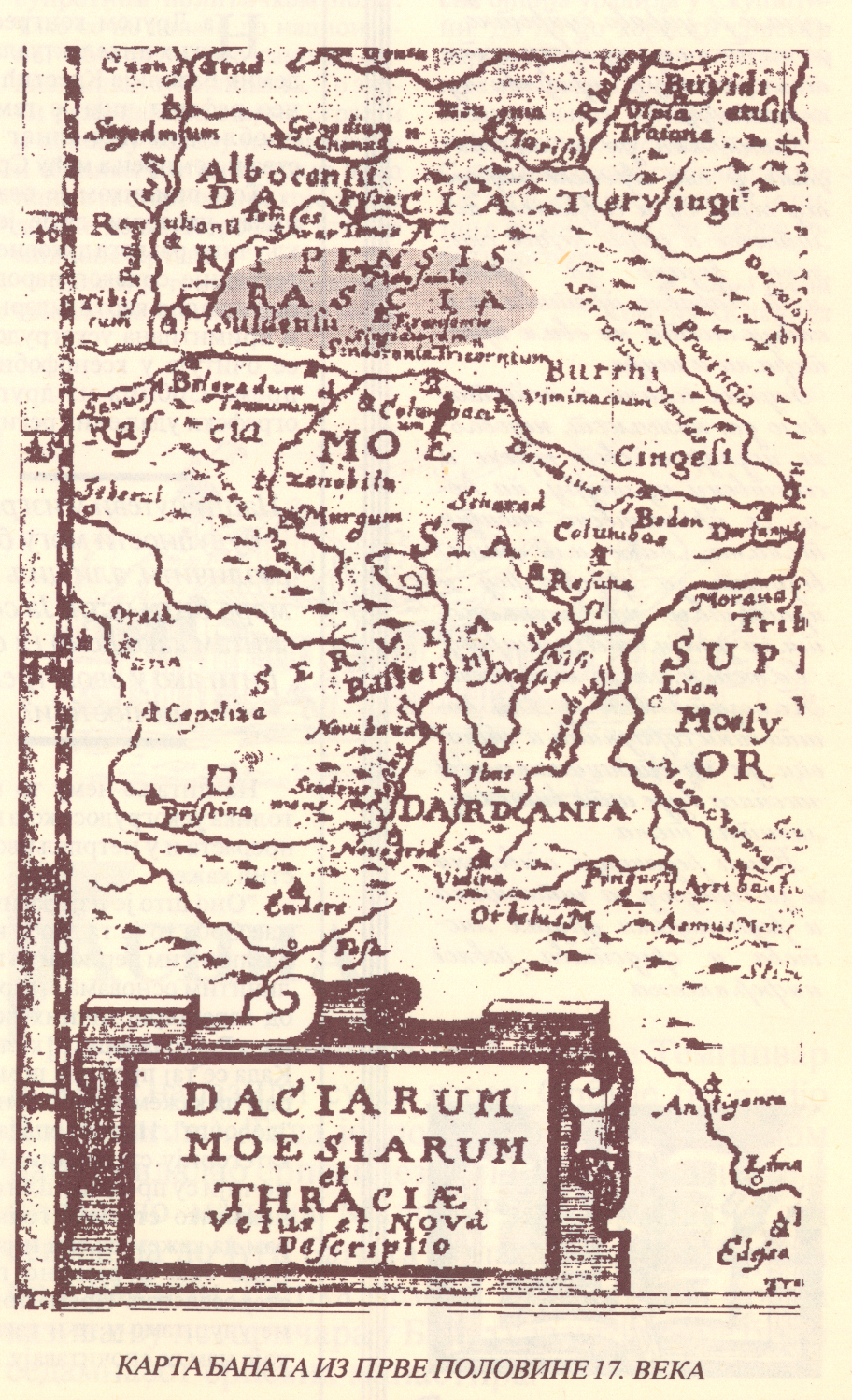
Map from the first half of the 17th century, in which name Rascia is located in Banat

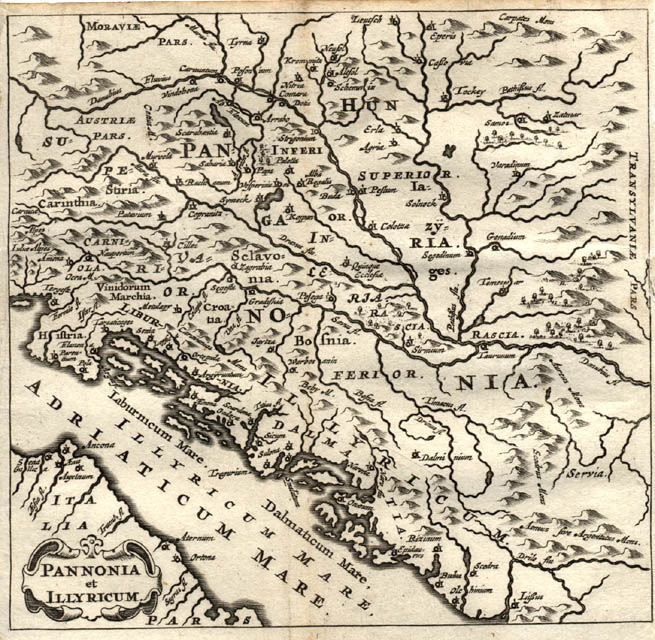
Map from 1661, in which name Rascia is located in Banat and Srem

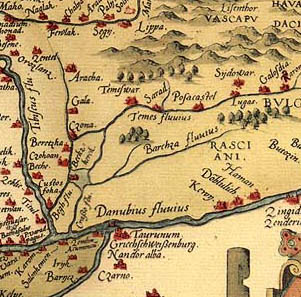
Map of Banat with the name Rasciani

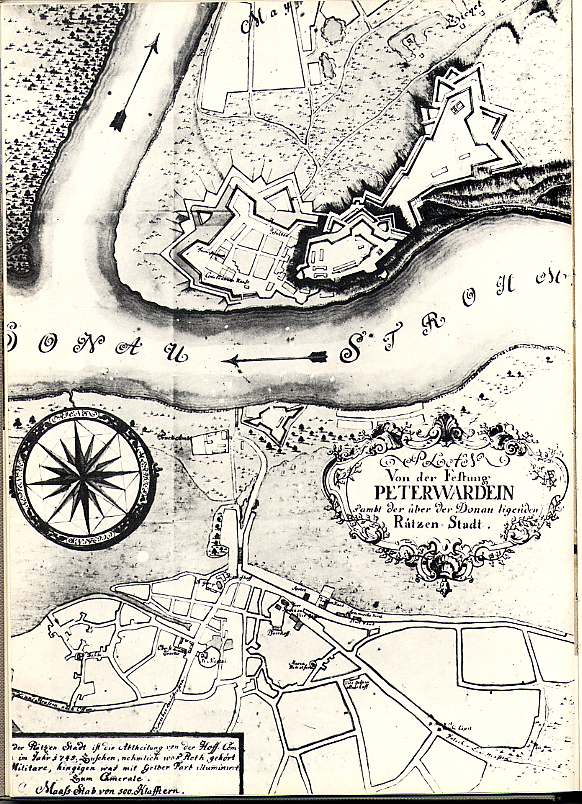
Map of Novi Sad (Ratzen Stadt) from 1745

== Sources ==
- Bataković, Dušan T., ed. (2005). Histoire du peuple serbe [History of the Serbian People] (in French). Lausanne: L’Age d’Homme. ISBN 9782825119587.
- Ćirković, Sima (2004). The Serbs. Malden: Blackwell Publishing. ISBN 9781405142915.
- Gavrilović, Vladan, and Dejan Mikavica. "Владавина права и грађанска равноправност срба у Хабзбуршкој монархији 1526-1792." Teme-Časopis za Društvene Nauke 04 (2013): 1643-1654.
- Ивић, Алекса (1914). Историја Срба у Угарској од пада Смедерева до сеобе под Чарнојевићем (1459-1690) [History of the Serbs in Hungary from the fall of Smederev to the migration under Čarnojević (1459-1690)] (in Serbian). Загреб.
- Ивић, Алекса (1929). Историја Срба у Војводини од најстаријих времена до оснивања потиско-поморишке границе (1703). Нови Сад: Матица српска.
- Kalić, Jovanka (1995). "Rascia - The Nucleus of the Medieval Serbian State". Faculty of Geography. Archived from the original on 2014-01-15.
- Lemajić, Nenad (2016). "Rani Kontakti Srba I Habzburgovaca (Do Mohačke Bitke)". Istraživanja: Journal of Historical Researches. 25 (25): 73–87. doi:10.19090/i.2014.25.73-87.
- Поповић, Душан Ј. (1955). Срби у Банату до краја осамнаестог века: Историја насеља и становништва. Београд: Научна књига.
- Поповић, Душан Ј. (1957). Срби у Војводини: Од најстаријих времена до Карловачког мира 1699. Vol. 1. Нови Сад: Матица српска.
- Поповић, Душан Ј. (1959). Срби у Војводини: Од Карловачког мира 1699 до Темишварског сабора 1790. Vol. 2. Нови Сад: Матица српска.
- Поповић, Душан Ј. (1963). Срби у Војводини: Оо Темишварског сабора 1790 до Благовештенског сабора 1861. Vol. 3. Нови Сад: Матица српска.
- Tutorov, Milan (1991). Mala Raška a u Banatu. Zrenjanin.
- "Rascia, Časopis o Srbima u Vojvodini". 1 (1). Vršac. May 1996.
- Varga, Szabolcs (2013). "Croatia and Slavonia in the Early Modern Age" (PDF). Hungarian Studies. 27 (2): 263–276. doi:10.1556/HStud.27.2013.2.5.
