= Acumincum =

Ancient Roman settlement in Serbia

Coordinates: 45°08′42″N 20°15′12″E

- Interactive map of Acumincum

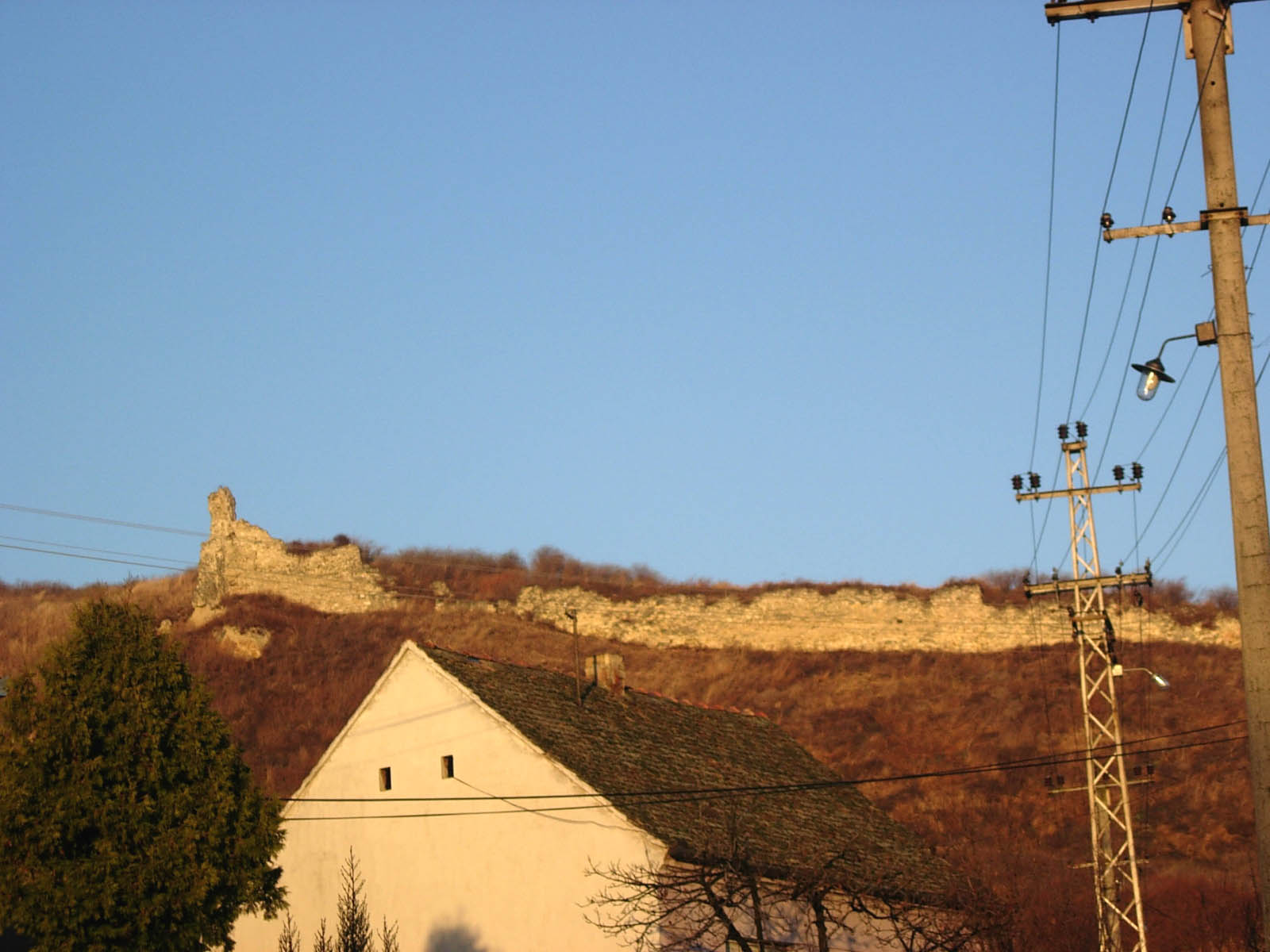
Remains of the Acumincum fortress.

Acumincum was an ancient Roman settlement, located in the present day town of Stari Slankamen, Serbia.

== History ==
In the 3rd century BC, the area was inhabited by Celtic Scordisci. In the 1st century BC, the fort was conquered by Romans and the settlement was known as Acumincum (acumen, point). It was in the Roman province of Pannonia as a fort on the Pannonian Limes, and was noted by ancient geographers Ptolemy (who wrote, in Greek, Ἀκούμιγκον) and the Geographer of Ravenna. The name also appears as Acimincum and in the Peutingerian Table, the name is written Acunum.

A Flavian fort was strategically situated for monitoring the lands beyond the Tisza river, the cohors I Britannica equitata and II Adjutrix were based in the town. Jupiter Dolichenus sculptures have been found in the town. Roman fortifications were excavated in the site of Dugorep.

Slavs settled in this area in the 6th century. Old Slavic graves dating from the 6th and 7th century have been found in Slankamen. During the Middle Ages, Slankamen was a fortified city and was first mentioned in 1072 as Castrum Zalankemen. Arsenije I Bogdanović from Srem, the second Serb archbishop (1233–1263) after Saint Sava, was born in the village of Dabar near Slankamen. In 1325, according to a letter by pope John XXII to the Roman Catholic archbishop of Kalocsa, a public hospital was built in the village. In the 15th century, the town was a possession of the Serbian despots Stefan Lazarević and Đurađ Branković. From 1451, it was property of Hunyadis and from 1498 of John Corvin. In the 16th century it was a residence of Radoslav Čelnik, a duke of Srem.

Acumincum was declared Archaeological Sites of Great Importance in 1991, and it is protected by Republic of Serbia.

== See also ==
- Stari Slankamen
- Archaeological Sites of Great Importance
- Tourism in Serbia
