= Stari Slankamen =

Stari Slankamen Стари Сланкамен Slankamen
- Village (Selo)
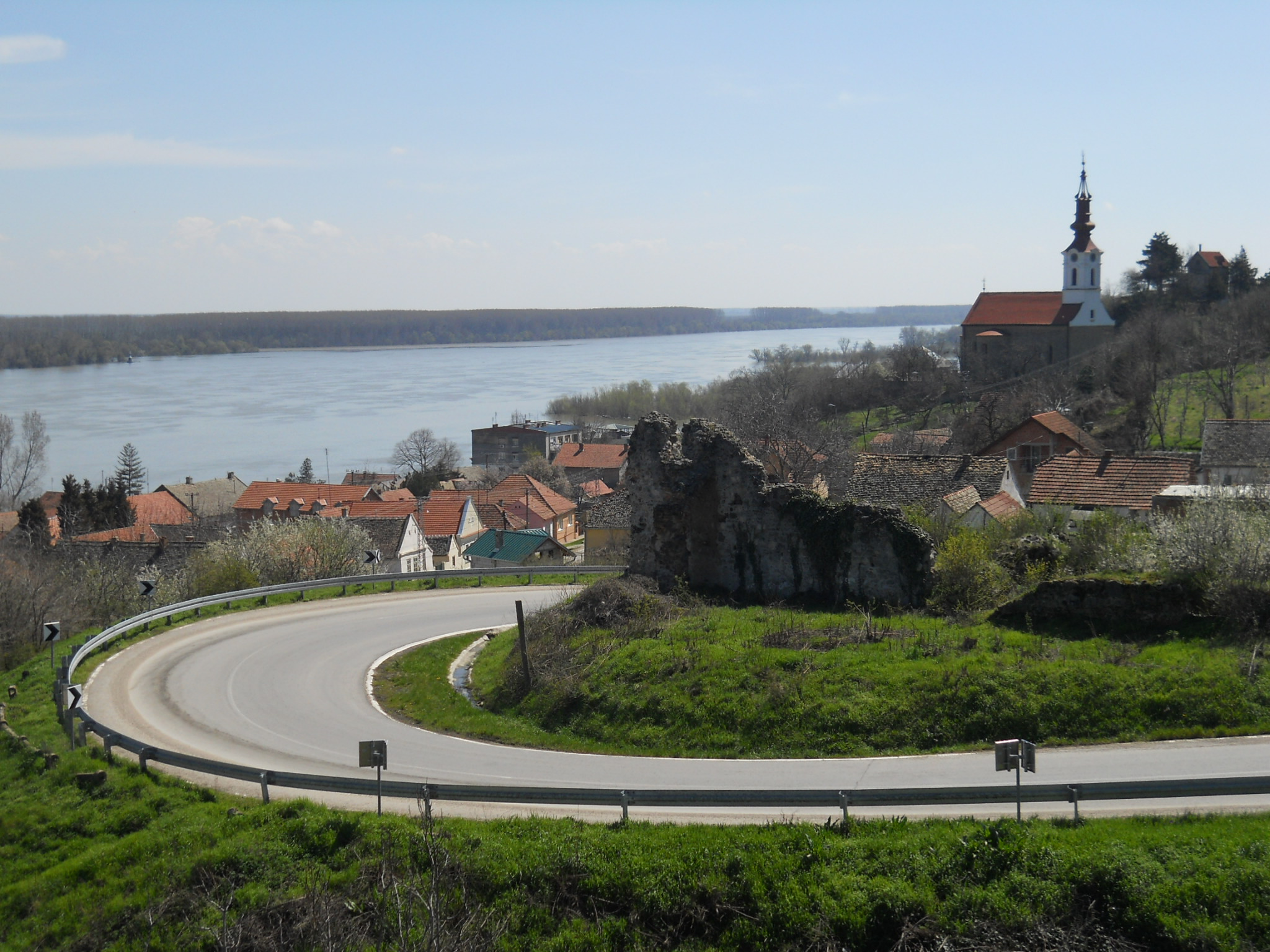
- Interactive map of Stari Slankamen
- Location within Vojvodina Location within Serbia Location within Europe
- Coordinates: 45°8′20″N 20°15′16″E
- Country: Serbia
- Province: Vojvodina
- Region: Syrmia
- District: Srem
- Municipality: Inđija

Population (2002)
  - Total: 674
- Time zone: UTC+1 (CET)
  - Summer (DST): UTC+2 (CEST)

Stari Slankamen (Serbian Cyrillic: Стари Сланкамен), also known as Slankamen (Serbian Cyrillic: Сланкамен), is a village located in the Inđija municipality, in the Syrmia District of Serbia. It is situated in the Autonomous Province of Vojvodina, across the mouth of the Tisa into the Danube.

== Name ==
Its name means "Old Slankamen", while the name of the neighbouring village, Novi Slankamen, means "New Slankamen". The name "Slankamen" itself means "the salty stone" in Serbo-Croatian. In Hungarian the village is known as Szalánkemén or Sztari Szlankamen (formerly also: Zalánkemén), in German as Alt-Slankamen, and in Turkish as Salankamen.

== History ==
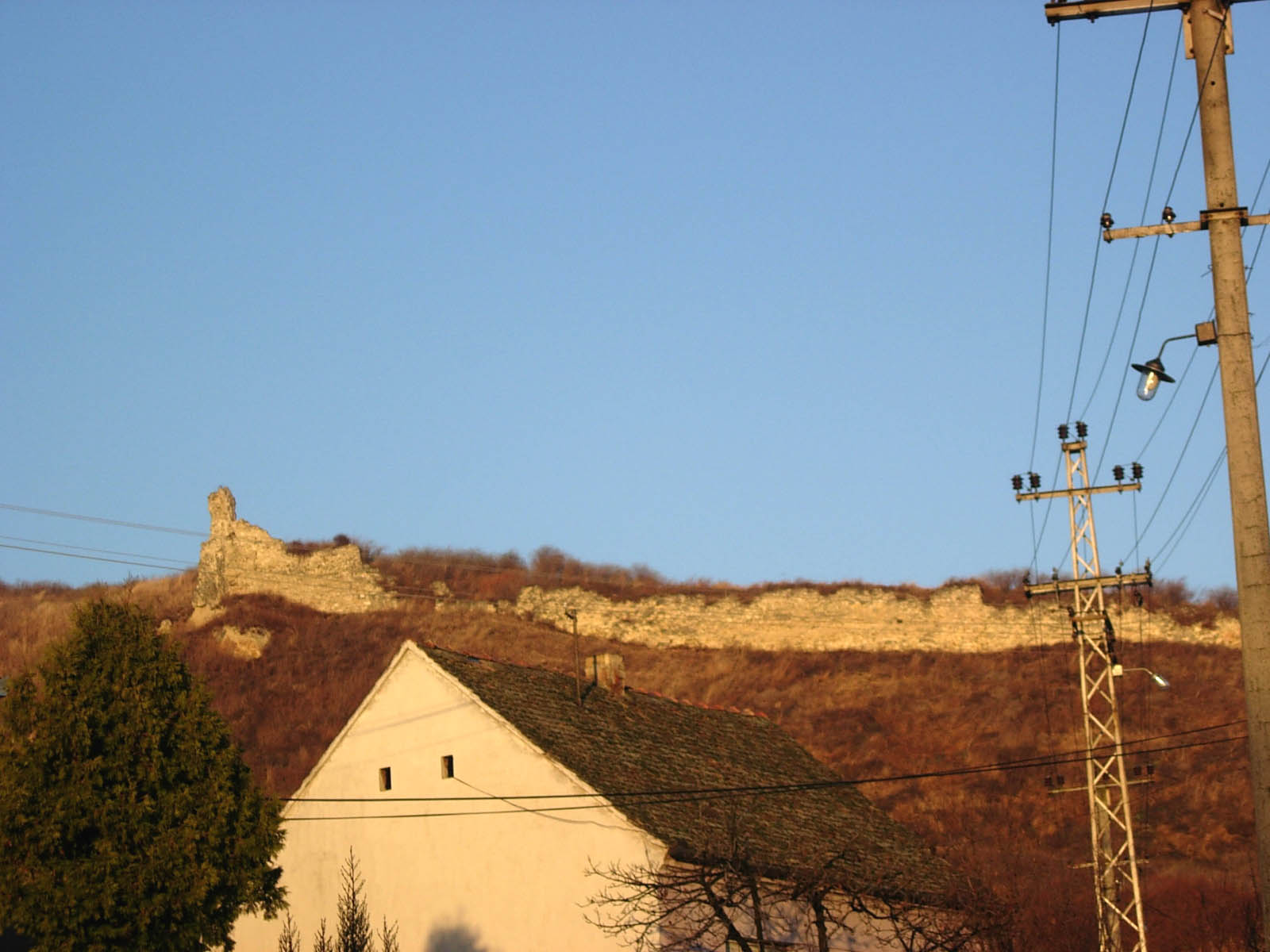
Remains of the Acumincum fortress.

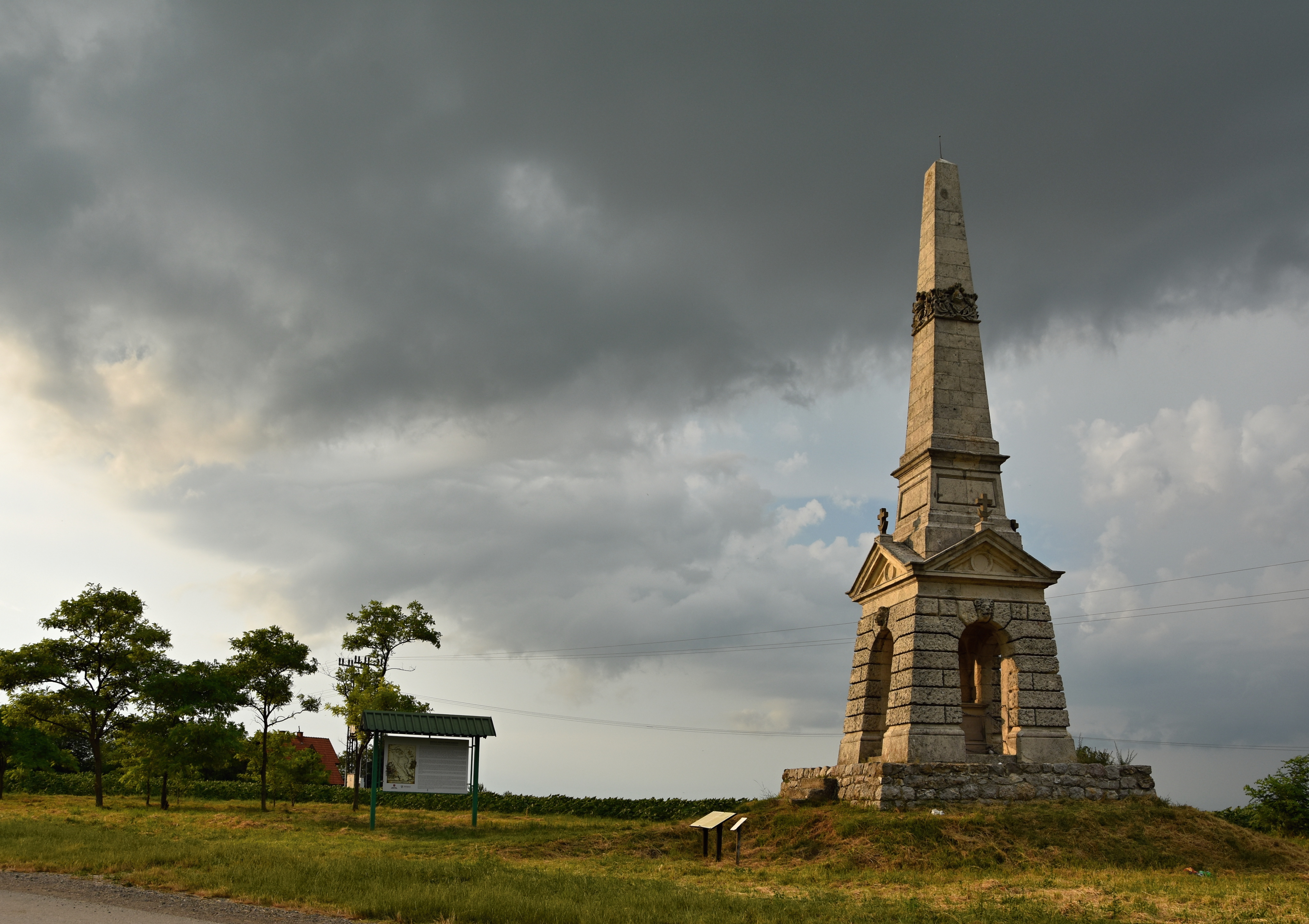
Monument commemorating the battle of Slankamen in 1691

In the 3rd century BC, the area was inhabited by Celtic Scordisci. In the first century BC, the fort was conquered by Romans and the settlement was known as Acumincum (acumen, point). A Flavian fort was strategically situated for monitoring the lands beyond the Tisza river, the Legion camp cohors I Britannica equitata and II Adjutrix were based in the town. Jupiter Dolichenus sculptures have been found in the town. Roman fortifications were excavated in the site of Dugorep.

Slavs settled in the area in the 6th century. Old Slavic graves dating from the 6th and 7th century have been found in Slankamen. During the Middle Ages, Slankamen was a fortified city and was first mentioned in 1072 as Castrum Zalankemen. Arsenije I Bogdanović from Srem, the second Serb archbishop (1233–1263), after Saint Sava was born in the village of Dabar near Slankamen. In 1325, according to a letter by pope John XXII to the Roman Catholic archbishop of Kalocsa, a public hospital was built in the village. In the 15th century, the town was a possession of the Serbian despots Stefan Lazarević and Đurađ Branković. From 1451, it was property of Hunyadis and from 1498 of John Corvin. In year 1691 in Slankamen battle of Slankamen took place. In the 16th century it was a residence of Radoslav Čelnik, a duke of Srem.

In 1783, the village known as Novi Slankamen (New Slankamen) was founded near Stari Slankamen (Old Slankamen).

== Population ==
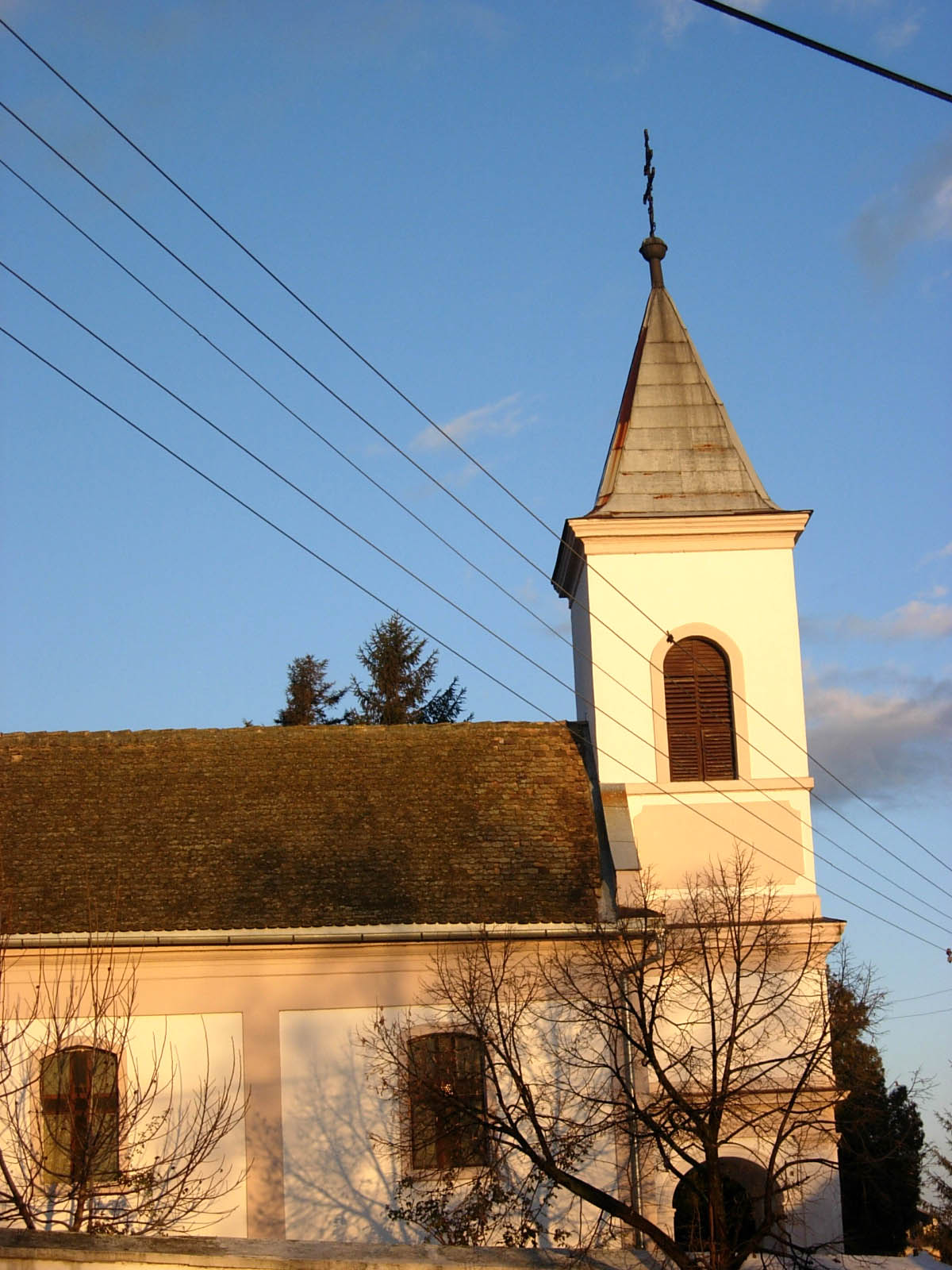
The Catholic church.

The population of the village numbers 674 people, of whom 485 are ethnic Serbs (2002 census).

Before the Yugoslav war ethnic Croats made up 38,78% of the population.

- 1961: 778
- 1971: 756
- 1981: 638
- 1991: 575

== Culture ==
The Orthodox Church dedicated to Saint Nikola was, according to the legend, founded in 1468 by Serbian despot Vuk Grgurević.

== Notable people ==
- Arsenije Sremac
- Radoslav Čelnik, a duke of Srem in the 16th century.
- Isaija Đaković
- Baron Gyula Wlassics de Zalánkemén (1852–1937), a Hungarian jurist, minister and academic.

== See also ==
- Battle of Slankamen
- List of places in Serbia
- List of cities, towns and villages in Vojvodina
- Syrmia
