= Dušan J. Popović =

Dušan J. Popović (1894–1985; Serbian Cyrillic: Душан Ј. Поповић) was a Serbian historian, a professor at the University of Belgrade.

Popović was an Aromanian or of Aromanian origin. In a 1937 work (O Cincarima), he regretted that "the days of the Aromanians as a distinct ethnic group are numbered" and that "they might endure for another 40–50 years, but no longer"; his prediction did not come to pass. Popović's works largely dealt with Serbs living in the 18th century outside of what latter would become known as the Serbia proper.

== Works ==
- Vojvodina: Prilozi proučavanju naše zemlje i našega naroda, Opšti deo Bačka : Prilozi proučavanju etničkih odnosa od sredine 16 veka do 1921 g., Serbian Academy of Sciences and Arts, 1925
- Поповић, Душан Ј. (1937). О Цинцарима: Прилози питању постанка нашег грађанског друштва (2. expanded ed.). Београд.
- Поповић, Душан Ј. (1930). О хајдуцима. Vol. 1. Београд: Народна штампарија.
- Поповић, Душан Ј. (1931). О хајдуцима. Vol. 2. Београд: Народна штампарија.
- Поповић, Душан Ј. (1935). Београд пре 200 година. Београд.
- Поповић, Душан Ј. (1950). Срби у Срему до 1736/7: Историја насеља и становништва. Београд: Српска академија наука.
- Поповић, Душан Ј. (1950). Србија и Београд од Пожаревачког до Београдског мира (1718-1739). Београд: Српска књижевна задруга.
- Поповић, Душан Ј. (1952). Срби у Бачкој до краја осамнаестог века: Историја насеља и становништва. Београд: Научна књига.
- Поповић, Душан Ј. (1952). Срби у Будиму од 1690 до 1740. Београд: Српска књижевна задруга.
- Поповић, Душан Ј. (1954). Велика сеоба Срба 1690: Срби сељаци и племићи. Београд: Српска књижевна задруга.
- Поповић, Душан Ј. (1955). Срби у Банату до краја осамнаестог века: Историја насеља и становништва. Београд: Научна књига.
- Поповић, Душан Ј. (1957). Срби у Војводини: Од најстаријих времена до Карловачког мира 1699. Vol. 1. Нови Сад: Матица српска.
- Поповић, Душан Ј. (1959). Срби у Војводини: Од Карловачког мира 1699 до Темишварског сабора 1790. Vol. 2. Нови Сад: Матица српска.
- Поповић, Душан Ј. (1963). Срби у Војводини: Оо Темишварског сабора 1790 до Благовештенског сабора 1861. Vol. 3. Нови Сад: Матица српска.
- Поповић, Душан Ј. (1964). Београд кроз векове. Београд: Туристичка штампа.
