= Radoslav Čelnik =

Serb general

- Duke of Syrmia
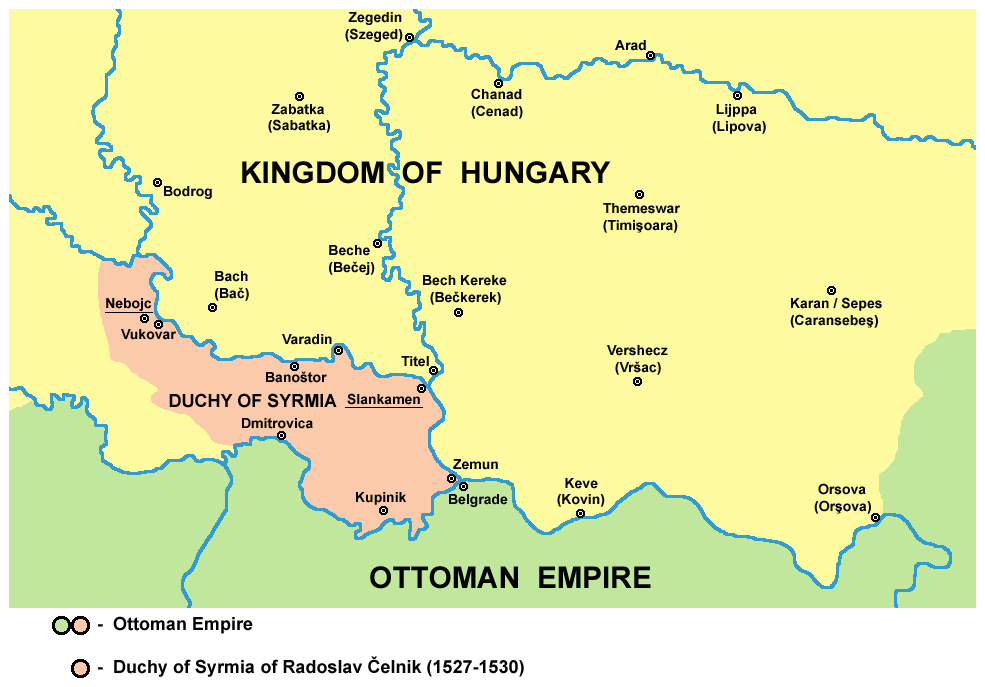
- Radoslav Čelnik's province (1527–30)
- Reign: 1527–1532
- Predecessor: Emperor Jovan Nenad

Radoslav Čelnik (Serbian Cyrillic: Радослав Челник, Hungarian: Cselnik Radoszláv; fl. 1526–1532), known as Vojvoda Rajko (војвода Рајко), was a Serb general (vojvoda) in the army of Jovan Nenad, the titular Serbian Emperor who held present-day Vojvodina, who after the death of Jovan Nenad (1527) took part of the army from Bačka to Syrmia and acceded into Ottoman service. Radoslav then ruled over Syrmia as "Duke of Syrmia (Srem)", initially as an Ottoman vassal (1527–1530) and then as a Habsburg vassal (1530–1532), until the region was conquered by the Ottomans. His residence and capital was in Slankamen (sr).

== Life ==
Radoslav hailed from Orahovica.

=== Service under Jovan Nenad ===
He was one of the generals of Jovan Nenad, the titular Serbian Emperor who occupied a province of the former Kingdom of Hungary which had been conquered by the Ottomans in 1526, in present-day Vojvodina. Jovan Nenad had defeated the Ottomans in Syrmia and the neighbouring regions, and had supported Ferdinand after John Zapolya refused to acknowledge his rule over Bačka, Banat and Syrmia. After defeating Zapolya's army he had himself proclaimed "Serbian Emperor". Jovan Nenad's army was then led by the chief general, Radoslav. In 1526, Radoslav held a province under Jovan Nenad, which included a town known as Belzond, near Sonta. By the beginning of 1527 the army had ca. 15,000 soldiers. In 1527, he is mentioned alongside Emperor Jovan in Subotica as his "personal and general captain".

After the murder of Jovan Nenad (1527) and fall of the territory, Radoslav had an army of 2,000 in Upper Podunavlje. He had taken part of the destroyed and dispersed army from Bačka to Syrmia, and acceded into Ottoman service.

=== Rule of Syrmia ===
Radoslav then ruled over Syrmia as an Ottoman vassal and styled himself as the "Duke of Syrmia (Srem)", while his residence was in Slankamen (sr).

At the same, he also secretly kept relations with the Habsburgs, which the Ottomans soon understood. Ferdinand had much hope in Radoslav. When the Ottoman army passed through Srem, Radoslav Čelnik crossed into Habsburg territory, and then returned when they had left. In 1530 he denounced the Ottoman vassalage and officially became a Habsburg nobleman, entitled the rule of Syrmia. In 1532, the Ottomans conquered Syrmia.

=== Retreat into Hungarian/Habsburg territory ===
With the Ottoman conquest of Syrmia in 1532, Radoslav retreated to Slavonia, and later lived in his town called Nebojc. It was located on the river Vuka, near Vukovar. Many Syrmian Serbs migrated into Hungary with the Ottoman conquest.

== Aftermath and legacy ==
He is enumerated in Serbian epic poetry, in the song Margita devojka i vojvoda Rajko (Маргита девојка и војвода Рајко).

He may be the same as veliki komornik Raka Milošević, who served Despot Jovan Branković.

== Annotations ==
- "Lord of Syrmia" or "Duke of Syrmia" (господар сремски војвода Радослав Челник).
