= State Road 120 (Serbia) =

Road in Serbia

State Road 120
- Serbian: Državni put II reda 120; Serbian Cyrillic: Државни пут II реда 120
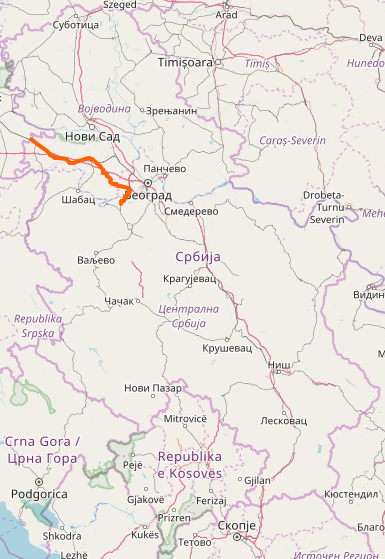

Route information
- Maintained by JP "Putevi Srbije"
- Length: 127.650 km (79.318 mi)

Major junctions
- From: Croatia – Serbia border at Šid
- To: Obrenovac

Location
- Country: Serbia
- Districts: Srem, City of Belgrade

Highway system
- Roads in Serbia; Motorways
← 119	→ 121

State Road 120, is an IIA-class road in northern Serbia, connecting Croatia (where it continues as the D46 road) at Šid with Obrenovac. It is located in Vojvodina and City of Belgrade.

Before the new road categorization regulation given in 2013, the route wore the following names: P 103, M 21, P 153a and P 267 (before 2012) / 115, 117 and 13 (after 2012).

The existing route is a regional road with two traffic lanes. By the valid Space Plan of Republic of Serbia the road is not planned for upgrading to main road, and is expected to be conditioned in its current state.

== Sections ==
Section number	Length	Distance	Section name
12001	5.397 km (3.354 mi)	5.397 km (3.354 mi)	Croatia – Serbia border at Šid – Šid
12002	11.845 km (7.360 mi)	17.242 km (10.714 mi)	Šid – Kukujevci
12003	4.861 km (3.020 mi)	22.103 km (13.734 mi)	Kukujevci – Kuzmin (link with)
12004	1.937 km (1.204 mi)	24.040 km (14.938 mi)	Kuzmin (link with) – Kuzmin (Sremska Mitrovica)
12005	20.441 km (12.701 mi)	44.481 km (27.639 mi)	Kuzmin (Sremska Mitrovica) – Sremska Mitrovica (Manđelos)
12006	0.391 km (0.243 mi)	44.872 km (27.882 mi)	Sremska Mitrovica (Manđelos) – Sremska Mitrovica (Jarak)
12007	12.517 km (7.778 mi)	57.389 km (35.660 mi)	Sremska Mitrovica (Jarak) – Ruma (Veliki Radinci)
12008	5.393 km (3.351 mi)	62.782 km (39.011 mi)	Ruma (Veliki Radinci) – Ruma (Voganj)
02107	1.277 km (0.793 mi)	64.059 km (39.804 mi)	Ruma (Voganj) – Ruma (Pećinci) (overlap with)
12009	13.673 km (8.496 mi)	77.732 km (48.300 mi)	Ruma (Pećinci) – Pećinci (link with)
12010	2.741 km (1.703 mi)	80.473 km (50.004 mi)	Pećinci (link with) – Pećinci (Subotište)
12011	3.152 km (1.959 mi)	83.625 km (51.962 mi)	Pećinci (Subotište) – Prhovo
12012	14.210 km (8.830 mi)	97.835 km (60.792 mi)	Prhovo – Vojvodina border (Deč)
12013	29.815 km (18.526 mi)	127.650 km (79.318 mi)	Vojvodina border (Deč) – Obrenovac (Zvečka)

== See also ==
- Roads in Serbia
