= Karlovčić =

Karlovčić Карловчић (Serbian)
- Village (Selo)
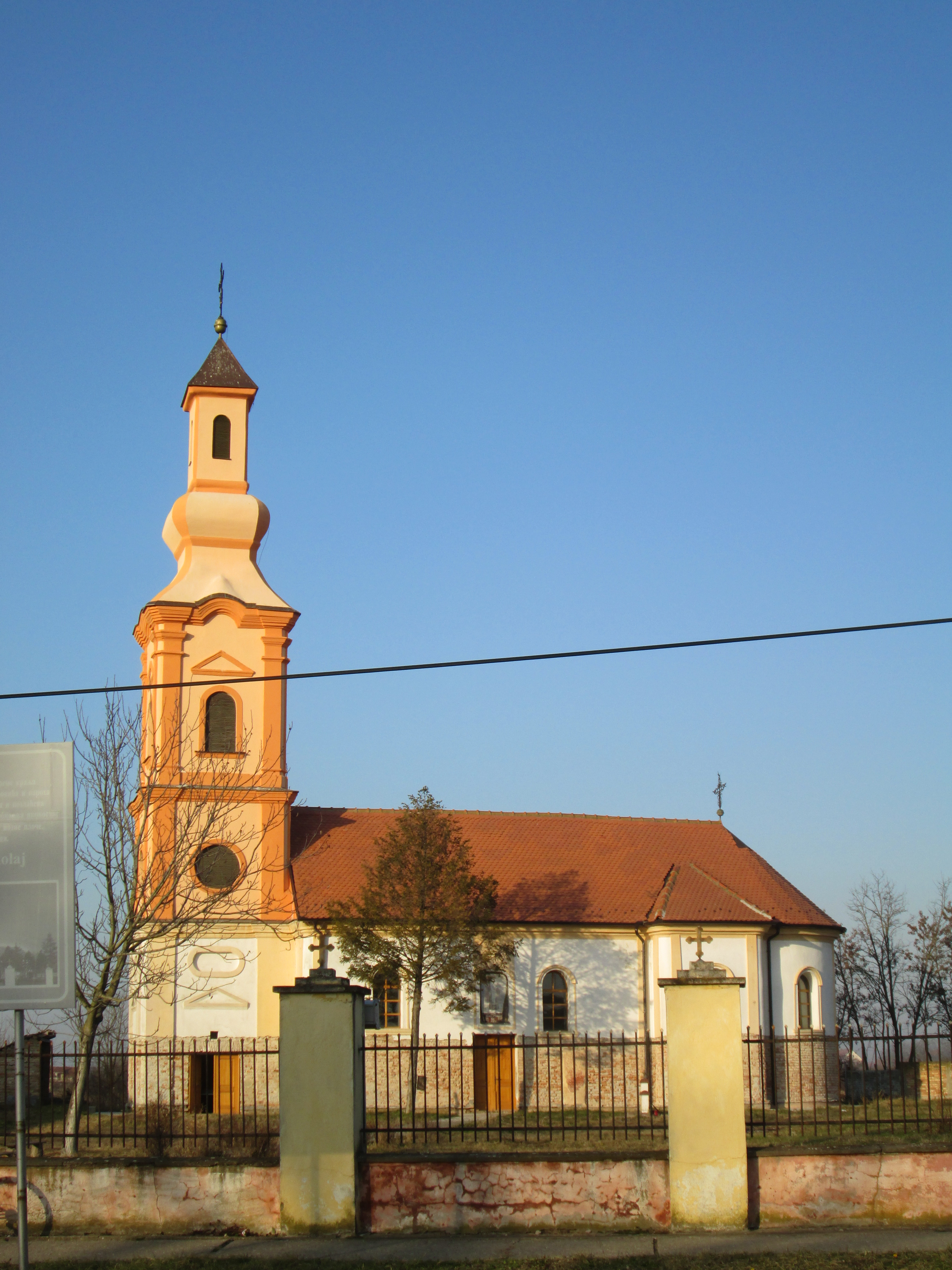
- Interactive map of Karlovčić
- Location within Vojvodina Location within Serbia Location within Europe
- Coordinates: 44°49′N 20°03′E
- Country: Serbia
- Province: Vojvodina
- District: Srem
- Municipality: Pećinci

Population (2002)
  - Total: 1,243
- Time zone: UTC+1 (CET)
  - Summer (DST): UTC+2 (CEST)

Karlovčić (Serbian Cyrillic: Карловчић) is a village in Serbia. It is situated in the Pećinci municipality, in the Srem District, Vojvodina province. The village has a Serb ethnic majority and its population numbering 1,243 people (2002 census).

== Sports ==
On June 5, 2009, the first representative Cricket match in Serbia's history was played in Karlovčić between the Serbia national cricket team and the Carmel & District Cricket Club.

== See also ==
- List of places in Serbia
- List of cities, towns and villages in Vojvodina
