= Obrež, Pećinci =

Obrež Обреж (Serbian)
- Village (Selo)
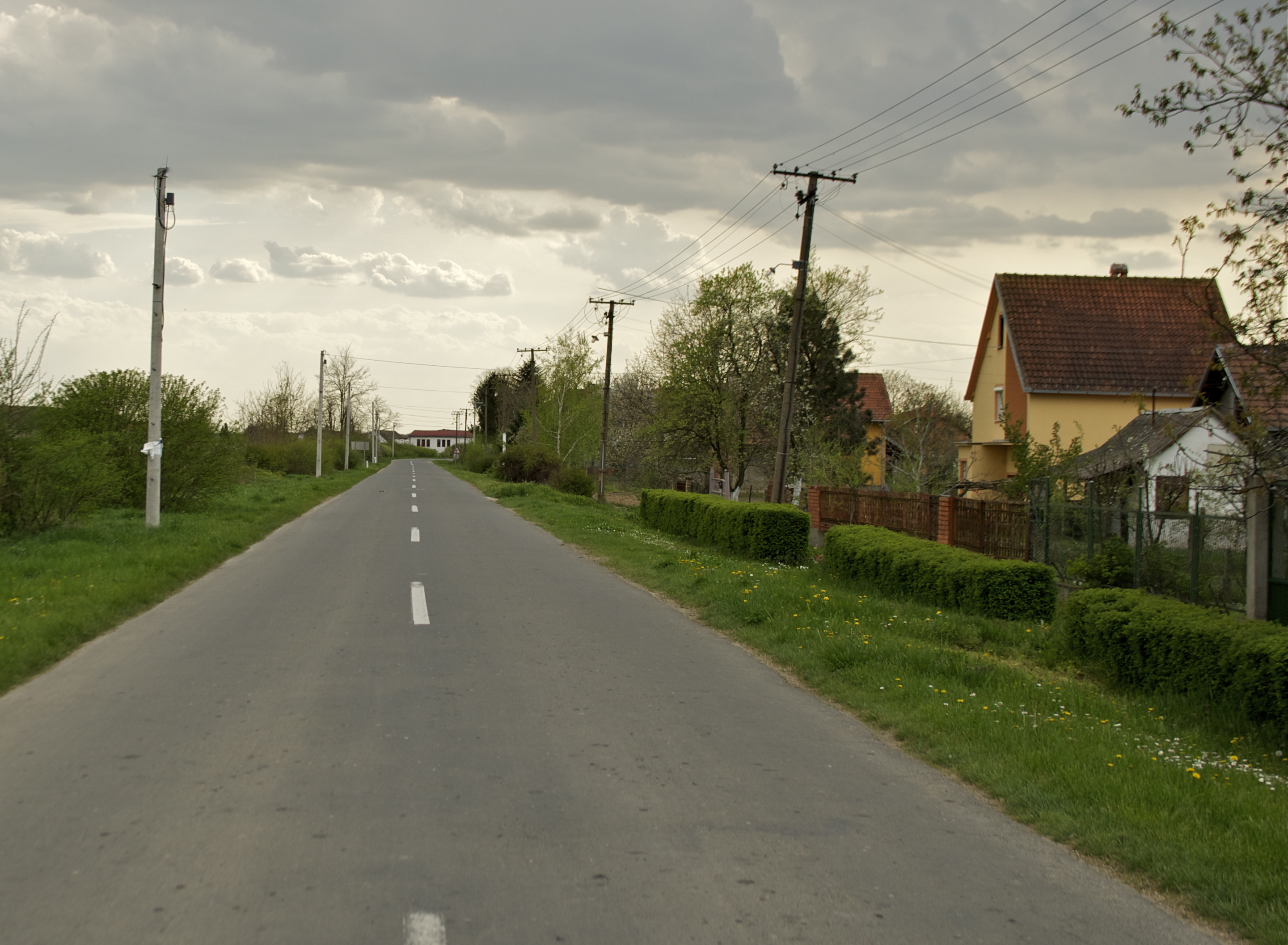
- Interactive map of Obrež
- Location within Vojvodina Location within Serbia Location within Europe
- Country: Serbia
- Province: Vojvodina
- District: Srem
- Municipality: Pećinci

Population (2002)
  - Total: 1,400
- Time zone: UTC+1 (CET)
  - Summer (DST): UTC+2 (CEST)

Obrež (Serbian Cyrillic: Обреж) is a village in Serbia. It is situated in the Pećinci municipality, in the Srem District, Vojvodina province. The village has a Serb ethnic majority and its population numbering 1,400 people (2002 census). In 2006, construction began on a new village center building in which a main administrative office, and a small night club/bar were built. The two venues frequently host Serbian folk singers.

== See also ==
- List of places in Serbia
- List of cities, towns and villages in Vojvodina
