= Sremski Mihaljevci =

Sremski Mihaljevci Сремски Михаљевци (Serbian)
- Village (Selo)
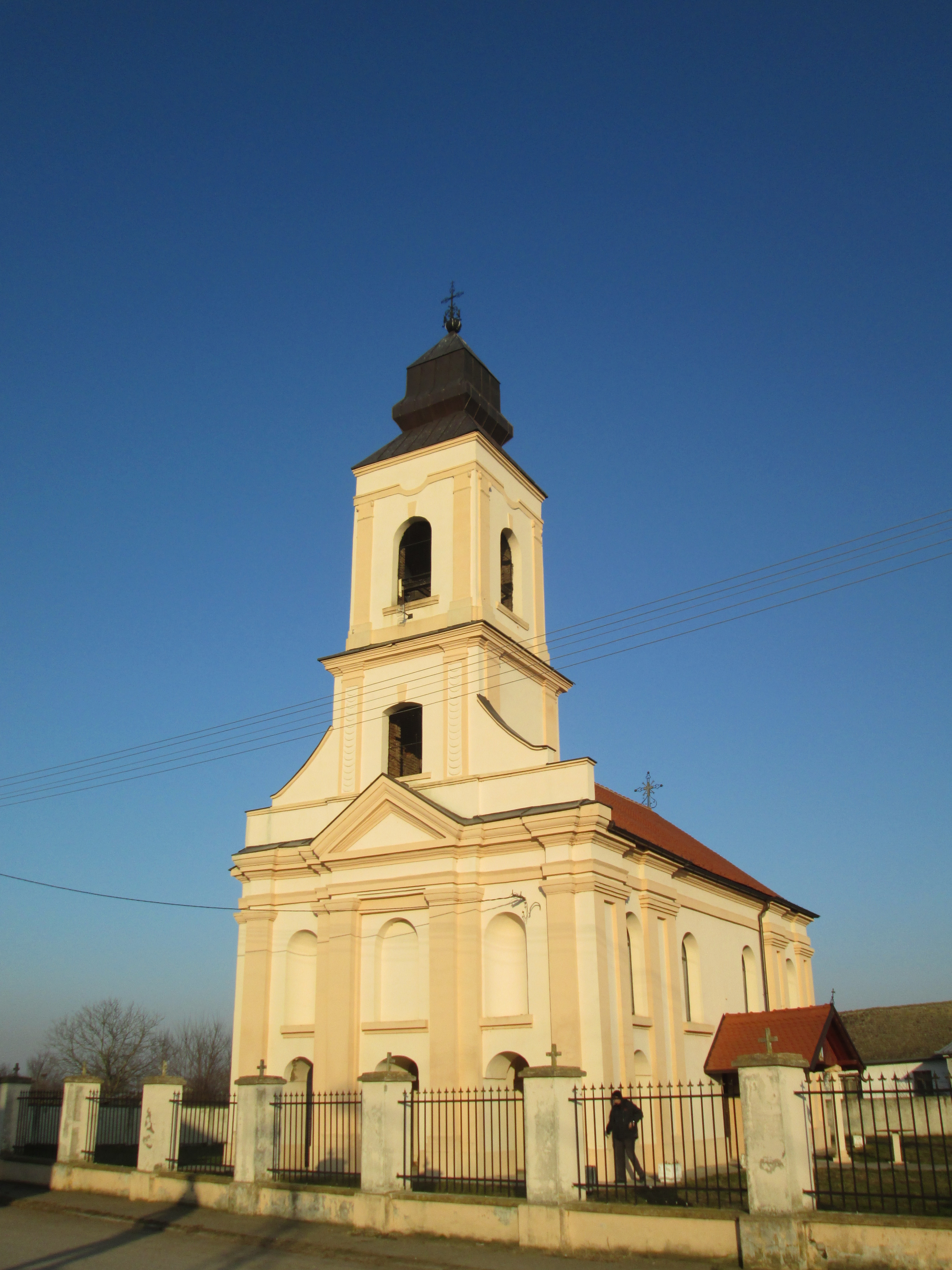

- Location within Vojvodina Location within Serbia Location within Europe
- Coordinates: 44°51′N 20°03′E
- Country: Serbia
- Province: Vojvodina
- District: Srem
- Municipality: Pećinci

Population (2002)
  - Total: 837
- Time zone: UTC+1 (CET)
  - Summer (DST): UTC+2 (CEST)

Sremski Mihaljevci (Serbian Cyrillic: Сремски Михаљевци) is a village in Serbia. It is situated in the Pećinci municipality, in the Srem District, Vojvodina province. The village has a Serb ethnic majority and its population numbering 837 people (2002 census).

== Name ==
The name of the town in Serbian is plural.

== See also ==
- List of places in Serbia
- List of cities, towns and villages in Vojvodina
