= Deč =

Deč Деч (Serbian)
- Village (Selo)
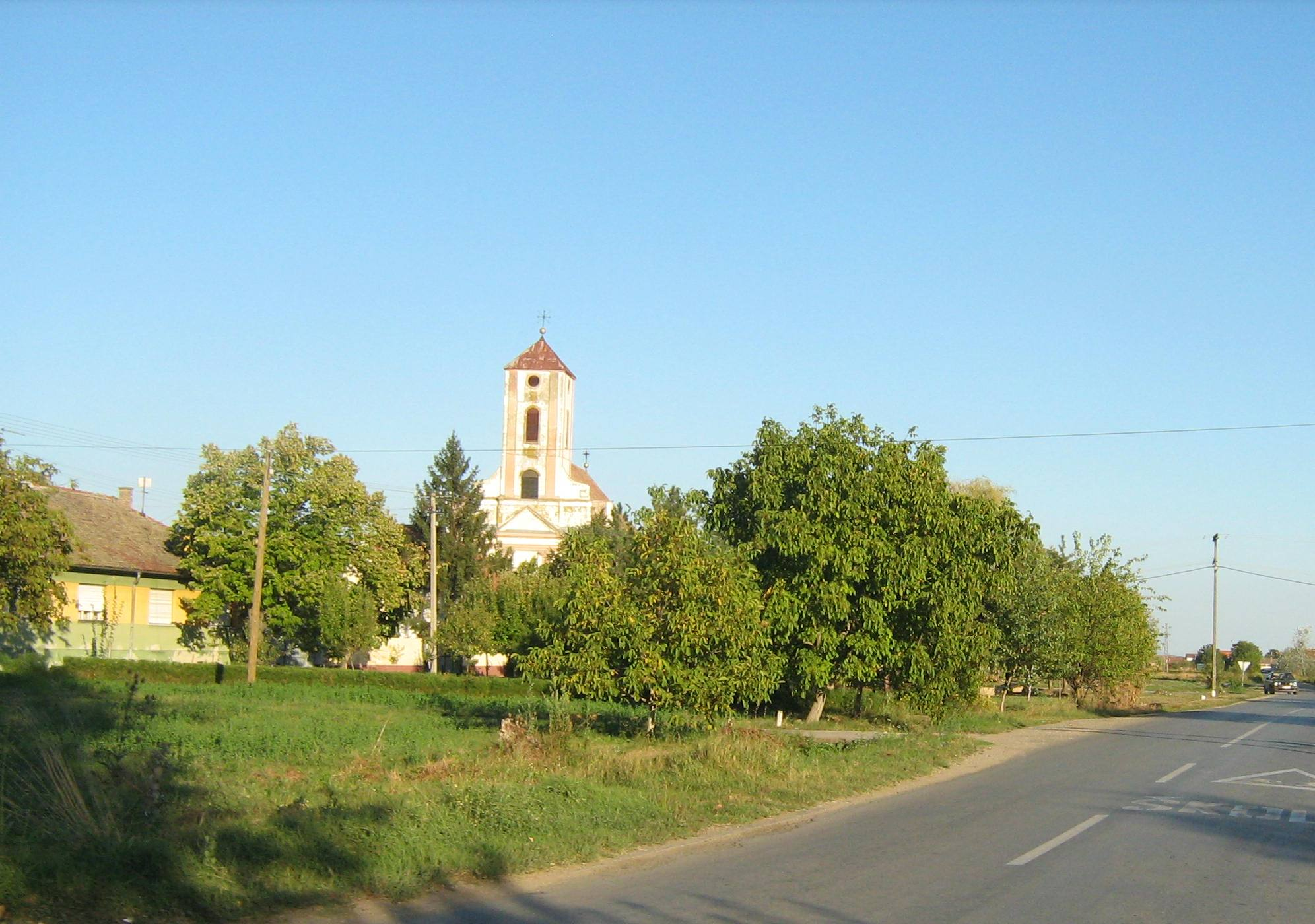
- An Orthodox church in Deč

- Location within Vojvodina Location within Serbia Location within Europe
- Coordinates: 44°50′N 20°07′E
- Country: Serbia
- Province: Vojvodina
- District: Srem District
- Municipality: Pećinci

Population (2023)
  - Total: 4,892
- Time zone: UTC+1 (CET)
  - Summer (DST): UTC+2 (CEST)

Deč (Serbian Cyrillic: Деч) is a village in Serbia. It is situated in the Pećinci municipality, in the Srem District of the Vojvodina Autonomous Province. The village has a Serb ethnic majority and a population numbering 1,499 people (2011).

== See also ==
- List of cities, towns and villages in Vojvodina
- List of places in Serbia
