= Prhovo =

Prhovo Прхово
- Village
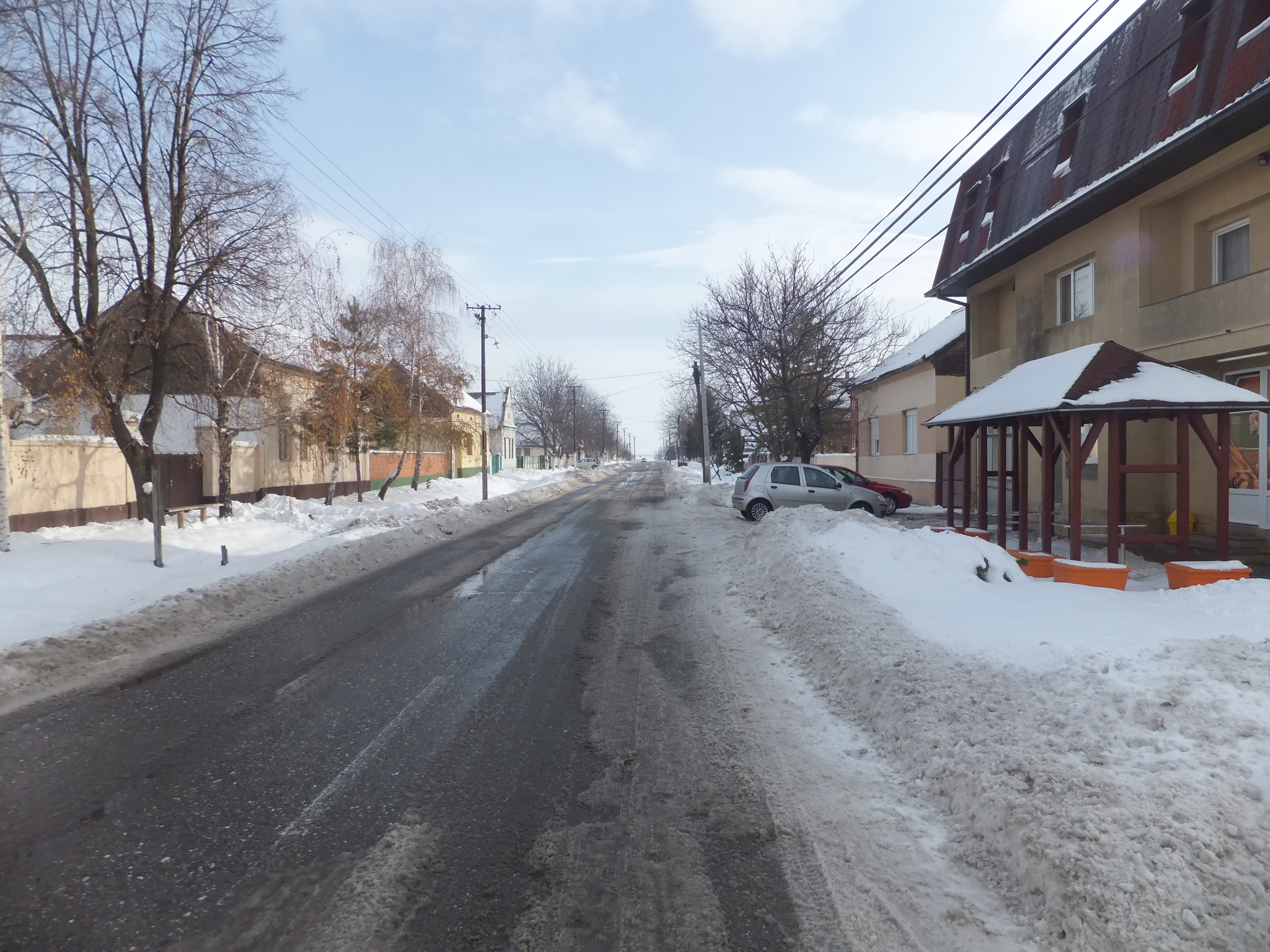
- Prhovo village center

- Location within Vojvodina Location within Serbia Location within Europe
- Coordinates: 44.8819°N 20.0944°E
- Country: Serbia
- Province: Vojvodina
- District: Srem
- Municipality: Pećinci]

Government
  - Mayor: Ivan Konjević

Population (2022)
  - Total: 708
- Time zone: UTC+1 (CET)
  - Summer (DST): UTC+2 (CEST)
- Postal code: 22442

Prhovo (Serbian Cyrillic: Прхово) is a village in Serbia. It is in Pećinci municipality of the Srem District in Vojvodina province. The village has a Serb ethnic majority and its population was 708 as of the 2022 census.

== See also ==
- List of places in Serbia
- List of cities, towns and villages in Vojvodina
