= Pećinci =

Pećinci Пећинци (Serbian)
- Village and municipality
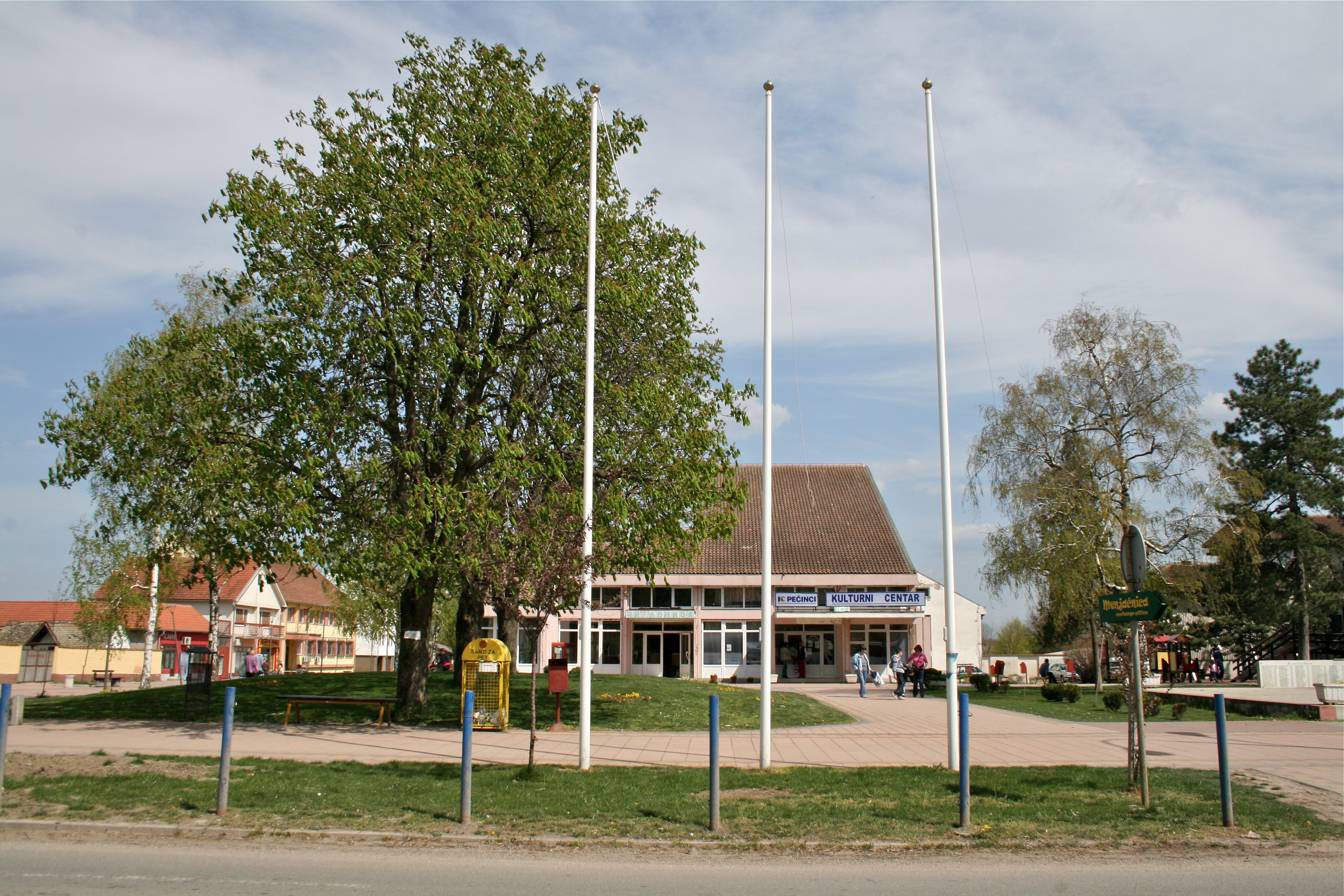

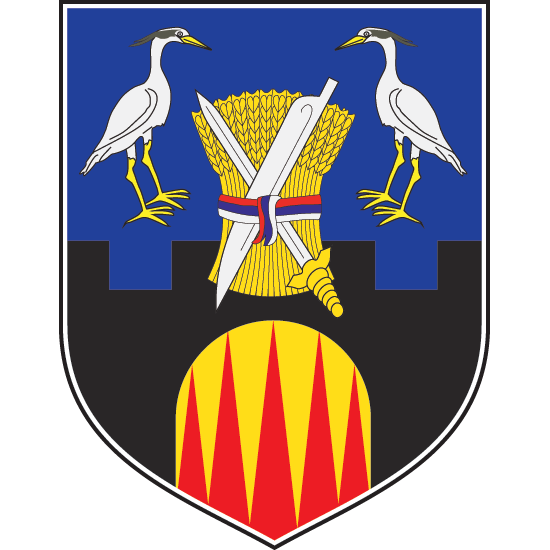
- Coat of arms

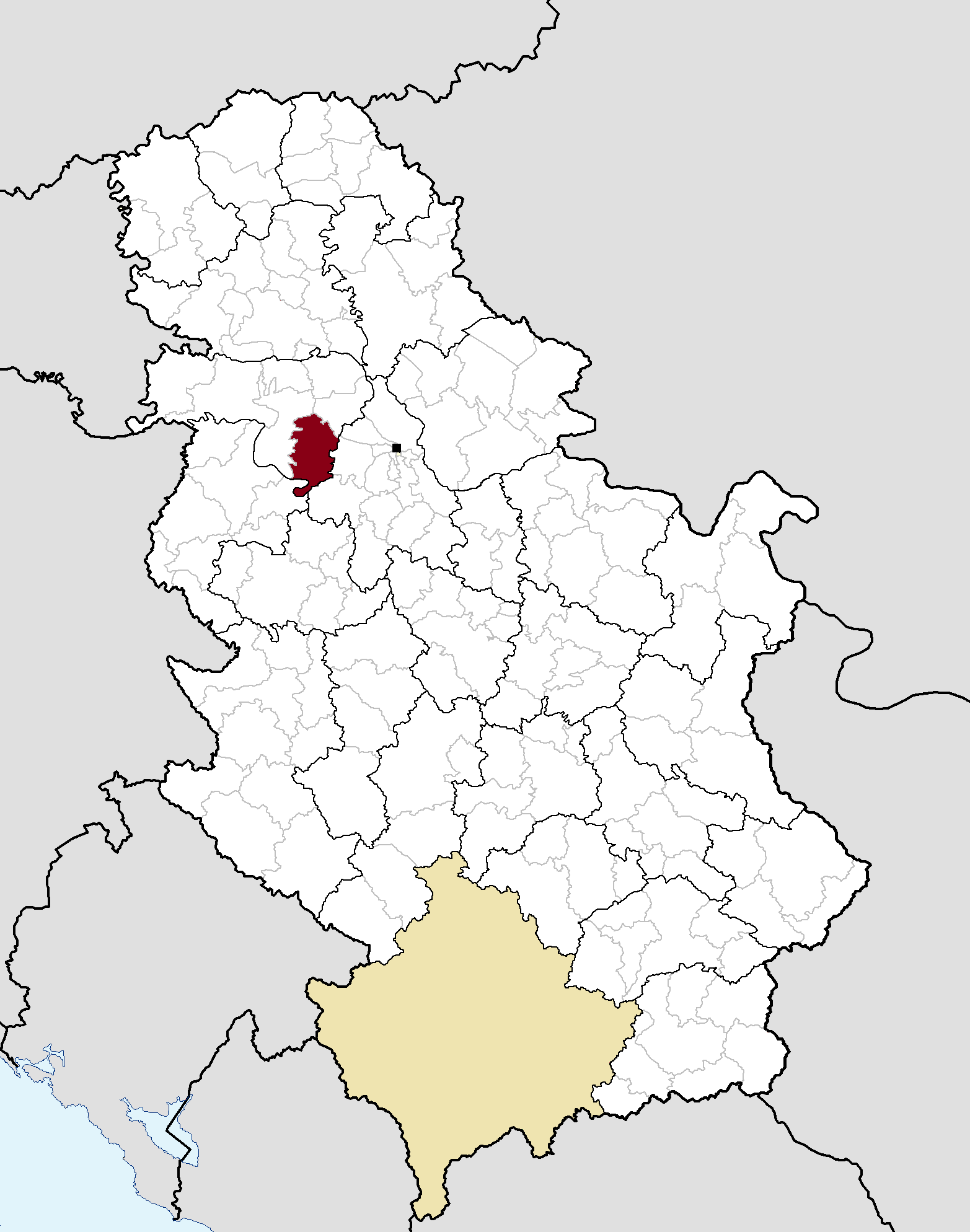
- Location of the municipality of Pećinci within Serbia
- Interactive map of Pećinci
- Coordinates: 44°54′N 19°58′E
- Country: Serbia
- Province: Vojvodina
- District: Srem
- Settlements: 15

Government
  - Mayor: Siniša Đokić (SNS)

Area
  - Municipality: 488.72 km^{2} (188.70 sq mi)
  - Village: 19.27 km^{2} (7.44 sq mi)
- Elevation: 83 m (272 ft)

Population (2022)
  - Municipality: 18,401
  - Density: 37.651/km^{2} (97.517/sq mi)
  - Village: 2,448
- Time zone: UTC+1 (CET)
  - Summer (DST): UTC+2 (CEST)
- Postal code: 22410
- Area code: +381(0)22
- Vehicle registration: RU
- Official languages: Serbian
- Website: www.pecinci.org

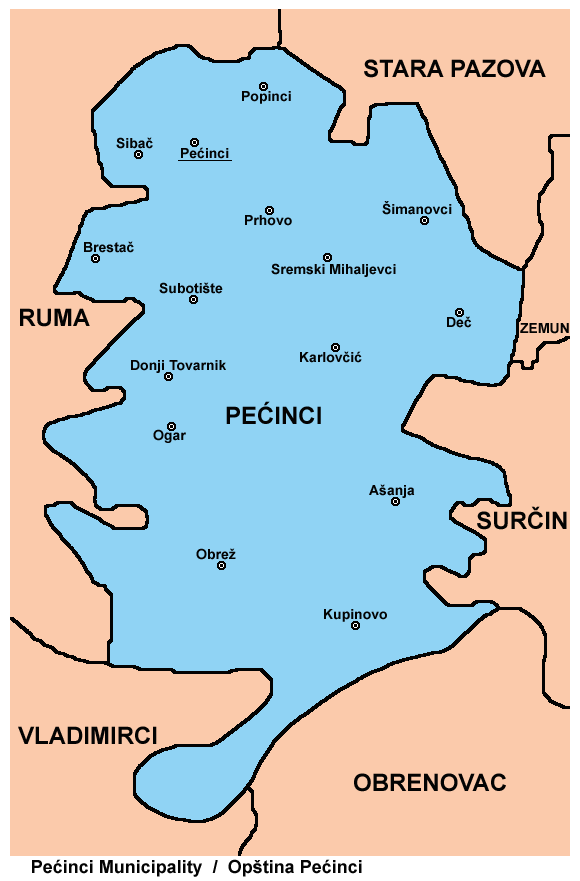
Map of Pećinci municipality

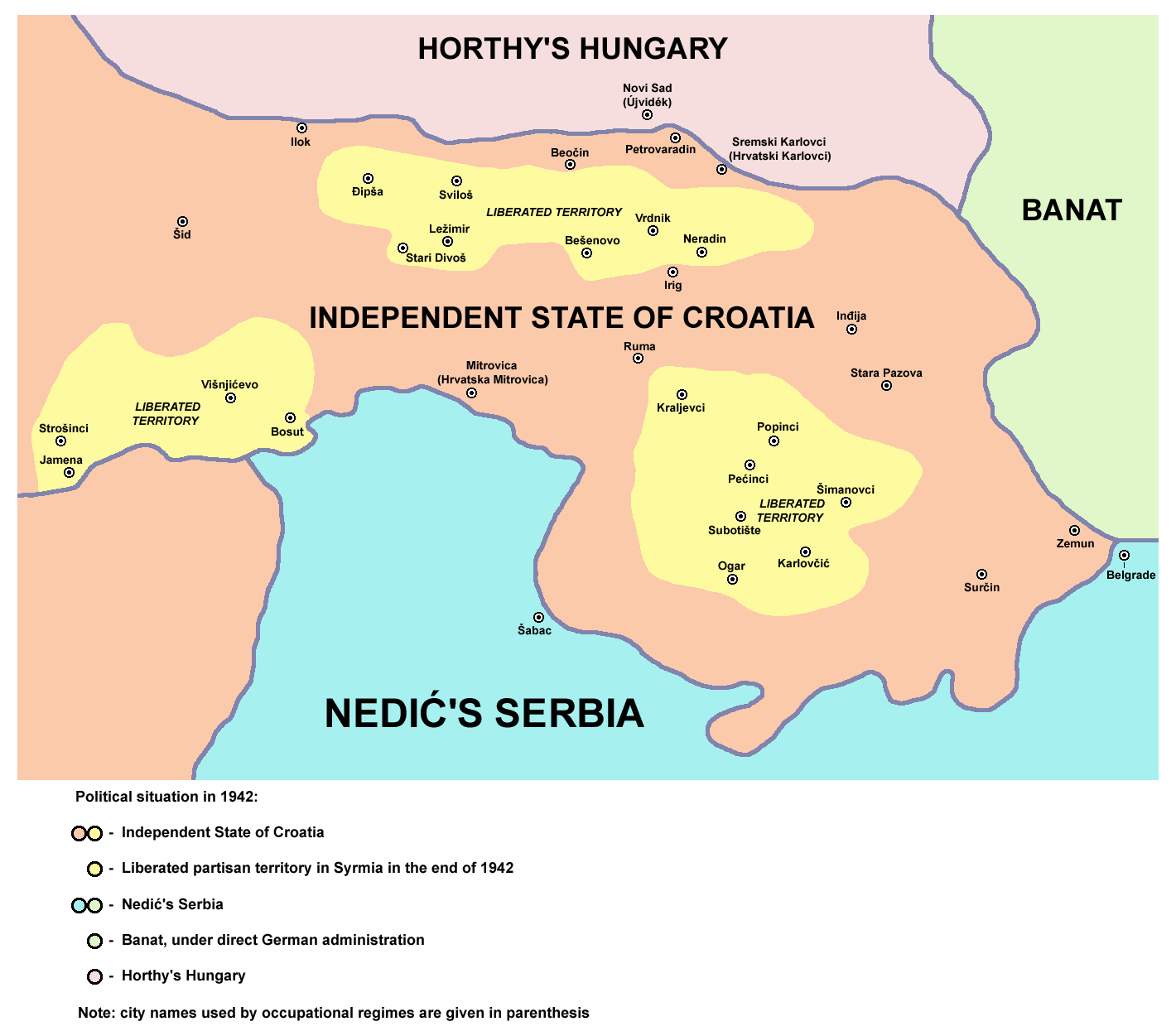
Liberated partisan territory in the area of modern Pećinci municipality during Axis occupation in the end of 1942

Pećinci (Serbian Cyrillic: Пећинци, pronounced [pětɕiːntsi]; Hungarian: Pecsince) is a town and municipality located in the Srem District of the autonomous province of Vojvodina, Serbia. The village has a population of 2,448, while Pećinci municipality has 18,401 inhabitants (2022 census).

== Name ==
In Serbo-Croatian, the village is known as Pećinci (Пећинци), in Hungarian as Pecsince, in German as Petschinzi, in Slovak as Pečinci, and in Rusyn as Печинци. Its name derived from the Serbian word "peć/пећ" ("furnace" in English), or "petlja/петља" ("loop" or "noose" in English). The name of the village in Serbo-Croatian is plural.

== History ==
The village was first time recorded by the sources in 1416. After that time, there were no other records about this settlement until 1702. The village was under Ottoman administration until the Treaty of Passarowitz (1718), when it passed to Habsburg monarchy. During Habsburg administration, it was part of the Habsburg Military Frontier. From 1848 to 1849, the village was part of Serbian Vojvodina, but was again included into Military Frontier in 1849. After abolishment of the frontier (in 1882), it was included into Syrmia County of Croatia-Slavonia, which was an autonomous kingdom within the Kingdom of Hungary and Austria-Hungary. According to the 1910 census, the village had a Serb ethnic majority.

In 1918, the village first became part of the State of Slovenes, Croats and Serbs, then part of the Kingdom of Serbia, and finally part of the newly formed Kingdom of Serbs, Croats and Slovenes (later renamed to Yugoslavia). From 1918 to 1922, the village was part of the Syrmia County, from 1922 to 1929 part of the Syrmia oblast, and from 1929 to 1941 part of the Danube Banovina. From 1941 to 1944, the village was occupied by the Axis powers and was attached to Pavelić's Independent State of Croatia. Territory of present-day Pećinci municipality was an important center of partisan resistance movement and a partisan liberated territory was formed in this area during the war.

After the war, the village became part of Vojvodina, an autonomous province of the Socialist Republic of Serbia and Socialist Federative Republic of Yugoslavia. Until 1960, villages of present-day Pećinci municipality were part of the municipalities of Ruma, Stara Pazova and Zemun (village of Pećinci itself was part of Zemun municipality). A separate municipality of Pećinci was formed in 1960 and the village of Pećinci was chosen to be the municipal center because of its favorable traffic position.

== Inhabited places ==
Aside from the village of Pećinci, municipality includes the following villages:

- Ašanja
- Brestač
- Deč
- Donji Tovarnik
- Karlovčić
- Kupinovo
- Obrež
- Ogar
- Popinci
- Prhovo
- Sibač
- Sremski Mihaljevci
- Subotište
- Šimanovci

== Demographics ==
Historical population
Year	Pop.	±% p.a.
1948	18,800	—
1953	18,567	−0.25%
1961	19,289	+0.48%
1971	18,490	−0.42%
1981	19,284	+0.42%
1991	20,077	+0.40%
2002	21,560	+0.65%
2011	19,720	−0.99%
2022	18,401	−0.63%

According to the 2011 census results, the municipality had 19,720 inhabitants.

=== Ethnic groups ===
All settlements in the municipality have an ethnic Serb majority. The ethnic composition of the municipality:

Ethnic group	Population	%
Serbs	17,965	91.1%
Romani	1,008	5.11%
Slovaks	79	0.4%
Croats	42	0.21%
Macedonians	33	0.17%
Montenegrins	22	0.11%
Yugoslavs	22	0.11%
Hungarians	21	0.11%
Muslims	11	0.06%
Russians	11	0.06%
Bosniaks	11	0.06%
Others	495	2.51%
Total	19,720	

== Economy ==
The following table gives a preview of total number of registered people employed in legal entities per their core activity (as of 2018):

Activity	Total
Agriculture, forestry and fishing	201
Mining and quarrying	4
Manufacturing	3,380
Electricity, gas, steam and air conditioning supply	11
Water supply; sewerage, waste management and remediation activities	51
Construction	119
Wholesale and retail trade, repair of motor vehicles and motorcycles	1,934
Transportation and storage	400
Accommodation and food services	144
Information and communication	107
Financial and insurance activities	13
Real estate activities	4
Professional, scientific and technical activities	118
Administrative and support service activities	84
Public administration and defense; compulsory social security	162
Education	288
Human health and social work activities	207
Arts, entertainment and recreation	32
Other service activities	52
Individual agricultural workers	393
Total	7,706

== Sports ==
Local football club Donji Srem spent three seasons in the country's top tier, the Serbian SuperLiga, in the 2010s.

== See also ==
- List of cities, towns and villages in Vojvodina
- List of places in Serbia
