= Serbs of Vojvodina =

Ethnographic group of Serbs native to Vojvodina

Срби у Војводини Srbi u Vojvodini
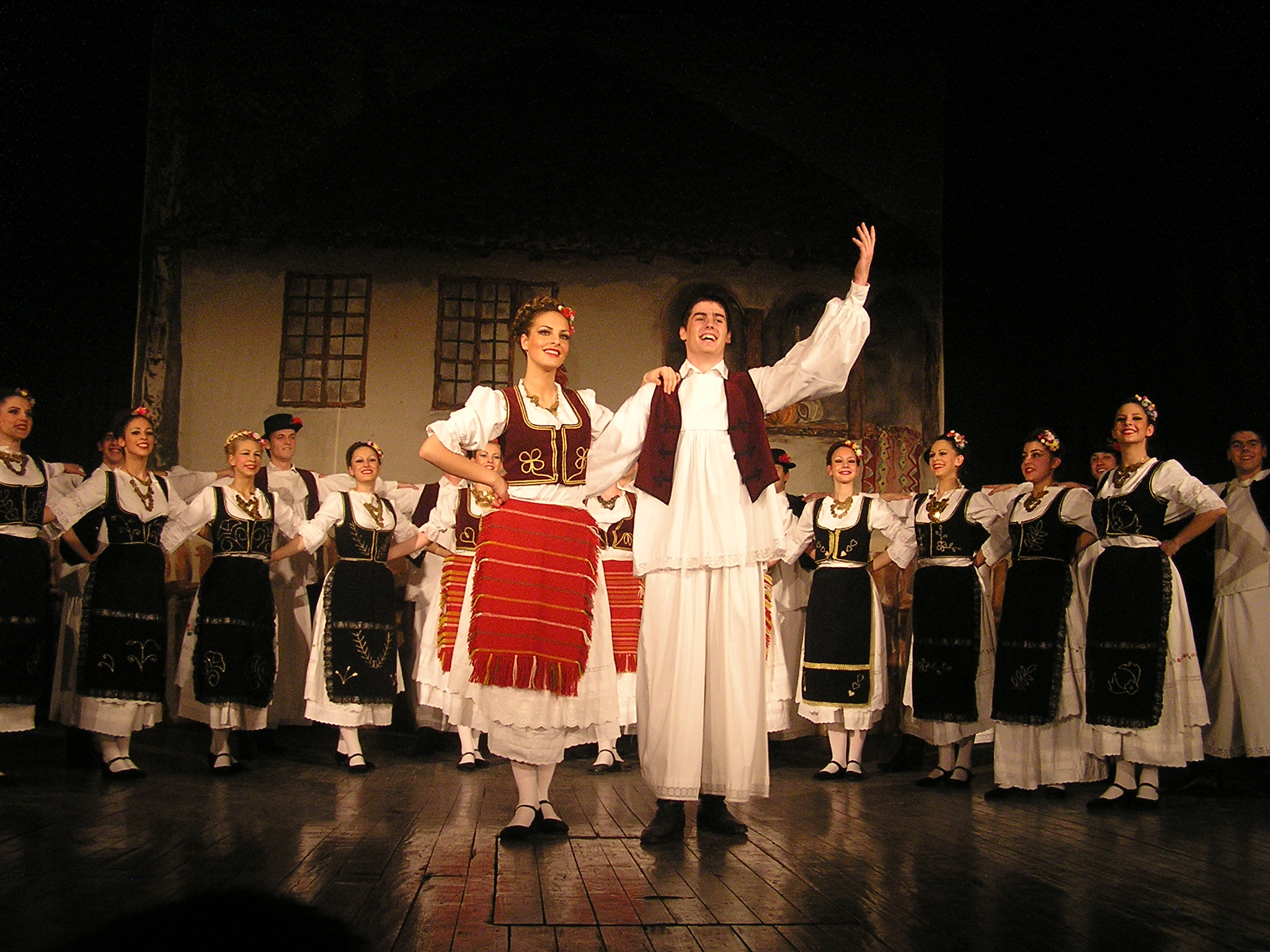
- Traditional folk costume of Serbs in Syrmia

Total population
- 1,190,785 (2022)

Regions with significant populations
- Bačka: 559,213
- Banat: 348,942
- Syrmia: 282,630

Languages
- Serbian

Religion
- Eastern Orthodoxy (Serbian Orthodox Church)

The Serbs of Vojvodina are an ethnographic group of Serbs native to Vojvodina, a northern province of Serbia. According to data from the 2022 census, there were 1,190,785 Serbs in Vojvodina, constituting 68.4% of the population.

== History ==
=== Early medieval period ===
Slavs settled today's Vojvodina in the 6th and 7th centuries, shortly before some of them crossed the rivers Sava and Danube and settled in the Balkans. Slavic tribes that lived in the territory of present-day Vojvodina included Obotrites, Severians, Braničevci, and Timočani.

In the 9th century, after the fall of the Avar state, the first forms of Slavic statehood emerged in this area. The first Slavic states that ruled over this region included the Bulgarian Empire, Great Moravia and Ljudevit's Pannonian Duchy. During the Bulgarian administration (9th century), local Bulgarian dukes, Salan and Glad, ruled over the region. Salan's residence was Titel, while that of Glad was possibly in the rumoured rampart of Galad or perhaps in the modern-day Kladovo (Gladovo) in eastern Serbia. Glad's descendant was the duke Ajtony, another local ruler from the 11th century who opposed the establishment of Hungarian rule over the region.

=== Hungarian rule ===
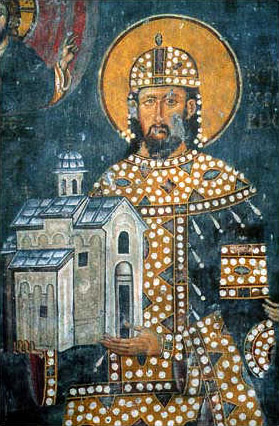
Stefan Dragutin, king of Syrmia, 1282–1316

Parts of Vojvodina were conquered by the Kingdom of Hungary between the 10th and 12th centuries. This was followed by the destruction of the local Slavic tribal organization and introduction of the county system of rule. The first known prefect of the Bač county (in the region of Bačka) was recorded in 1074 and his name was Vid, a Slavic name by origin. During the rule of the Hungarian king Coloman (1095–1116), the local Serb nobles in Bačka were Uroš, Vukan, and Pavle. After the establishment of an autocephalous Serbian Orthodox Church in 1219 and negotiations between Archbishop Sava and the Hungarian crown, the Eastern Orthodox Slavic population north of the Danube was subjected under its jurisdiction. Arsenije Sremac, the second Serbian archbishop after Saint Sava, was born in Syrmia, in the village Dabar near Slankamen. A record from 1309 speak about "Schismatics" (Eastern Orthodox Christians), who lived in Bačka.

From 1282 to 1316 Serbian King Stefan Dragutin of Nemanjić dynasty reigned several lands as a "King of Syrmia". The center of his realm was in "Lower Syrmia" (modern-day Mačva region), while he also possibly ruled "Upper Syrmia" (i.e. modern-day Syrmia region). Stefan Dragutin died in 1316, and was succeeded by his son Vladislav, who was a vassal of the Hungarian King.

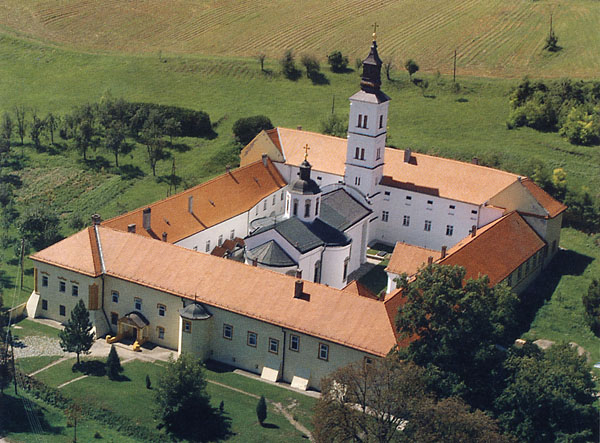
Krušedol Monastery, founded in 1509 as the legacy of the last Serbian despot, of the house of Branković

An increasing number of Serbs began settling in the present-day Vojvodina from the 14th century onwards. By 1483, according to a Hungarian source, as much as half of the population of Vojvodina at the time were ethnic Serbs. The Hungarian kings encouraged the immigration of Serbs to the kingdom, and recruited many of them as soldiers and border guards. A letter of King Matthias Corvinus from 1483 mentions that 200,000 Serbs had settled the Hungarian kingdom in the last four years. After the Ottoman Empire conquered Serbian Despotate in 1459, Serbian titular despots, "despots of the Kingdom of Rascia", ruled in parts of Vojvodina as vassals of the Hungarian crown. The territory of Vuk Grgurević (1471–85), the Serbian Despot in Hungarian service (as "Despot of the Kingdom of Rascia"), was called "Little Rascia". The residence of the despots was Kupinik (today Kupinovo) in Syrmia. The Serbian despots that ruler in the territory of present-day Vojvodina were: Vuk Grgurević (1471-1485), Đorđe Branković (1486-1496), Jovan Branković (1496-1502), Ivaniš Berislavić (1504-1514), and Stjepan Berislavić (1520-1535). The fact that Serbian despots ruled in the territory of present-day Vojvodina as well as the presence of large Serb population, are reasons why in many historical records and maps made between 15th and 18th centuries, territory of present-day Vojvodina was named Rascia (Raška, i.e. Serbia) and Little Rascia (Little Serbia). A 1542 document describes that "Serbia" stretched from Lipova and Timișoara to the Danube, while a 1543 document that Timișoara and Arad being located "in the middle of Rascian land" (in medio Rascianorum). At that time, the language spoken by the majority of the people in the region between Mureș and Körös was Serbian. Apart from Serbian being the main language of the Banat population, there were 17 Serbian monasteries active in Banat at that time. The territory of Banat had received a Serbian character and was called "Little Rascia".

=== Ottoman rule ===
The Ottoman Empire took control of Vojvodina following the Battle of Mohács of 1526 and the conquest of Banat in 1552. Soon after the Battle of Mohač, Jovan Nenad, a leader of the Serb mercenaries, established his rule in Bačka, northern Banat and a small part of Syrmia. He created an ephemeral independent state, with Subotica as its capital. At the height of his power, Jovan Nenad proclaimed himself "Serbian Emperor". Taking advantage of the extremely confused military and political situation, the Hungarian noblemen from the region joined forces against him and defeated the Serbian troops in 1527. "Emperor" Jovan Nenad was assassinated and his state collapsed. After the assassination of Jovan Nenad, the general commander of his army, Radoslav Čelnik, moved from Bačka to Syrmia with part of the former emperor's army, acceding into the Ottoman service and ruling over Syrmia as Ottoman vassal, taking the title of the Duke of Syrmia while his residence was in Slankamen.

The establishment of the Ottoman rule caused a massive depopulation of the Vojvodina region. Most of the Hungarians and many local Serbs fled from the region and escaped to the north. The majority of those who stayed in the region were Serbs, mainly now engaging either in farming or in Ottoman military service. Under Ottoman policy, many Serbs were settled in the region. Villages were mostly populated by Serbs while towns were populated by both Muslims and Serbs.

In 1594, Serbs in Banat started a large uprising against Ottoman rule. The uprising broke in the initial stage of the Long Turkish War, and was fought by local Serbs, numbering some 5,000, who managed to quickly take over several towns in the region before being crushed by the Ottoman army. The relics of Saint Sava were burnt by the Ottomans as a retaliation.

=== Habsburg rule ===
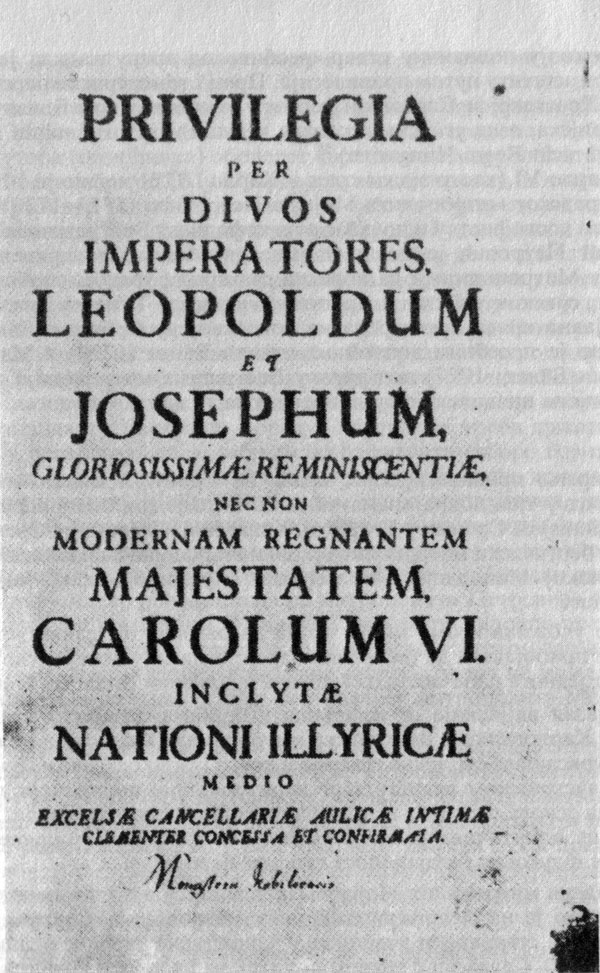
Serb (Illyrian Nation) privileges from 1732 in which Serbs were a recognized nation in the Habsburg monarchy

The Habsburg monarchy took control of Vojvodina among other lands by the treaties of Karlovci (1699) and Požarevac (1718). The Serbian patriarch, Arsenije III Čarnojević, fearing the revenge of the Ottomans, led what was known as the Great Migrations of the Serbs (to the Habsburg monarchy) in the last decade of the 17th century. As many as 37,000 ethnic Serb families migrated, but these Serbs mostly went further to the north of modern-day Vojvodina and settled in the territory of modern-day Hungary with only small part of them settling in the territory of present-day northwestern Vojvodina. However, because of this event, the Habsburg Emperor promised religious freedom to all Serbs as well as the right to elect their own "vojvoda" (military and civil governor). The emperor also recognized Serbs as one of the nations of the Habsburg monarchy and their right to have territorial autonomy within one separate voivodeship. This right, however, was not realized before the revolution in 1848–1849. The immigration of Serbs to the Habsburg monarchy continued during the 18th century.

Much of the area of present-day Vojvodina was incorporated into the Military Frontier. During the Kuruc War (1703–1711) of Francis II Rakoczi, the territory of present-day Vojvodina was a battlefield between Hungarian rebels and local Serbs who fought on the side of the Habsburg Emperor. Serbs in Bačka suffered the greatest losses: Hungarian rebels burned Serb villages and many Serbs were expelled. Darvas, the prime military commander of the Hungarian rebels, which fought against Serbs in Bačka, wrote: "We burned all large places of Rascians, on the both banks of the rivers Danube and Tisa".

During the Habsburg rule many non-Serbs also settled in the territory of present-day Vojvodina. They were mainly Catholic Germans and Hungarians, but also Ruthenians, Slovaks, Czechs, Poles, Romanians, and others. Because of this immigration, Vojvodina became one of the most ethnically diverse regions of Europe. However, there was also some emigration of Serbs from Vojvodina: after the Tisa-Moriš section of the Military Frontier was abolished, Serbs from the north-eastern parts of Bačka left this region and migrated to Russia (notably to New Serbia and Slavo-Serbia) in 1752, and this region was then re-populated with new Hungarian settlers. Serbs, however, remained the single largest ethnic group.

Between the 16th and 19th centuries, Vojvodina was a cultural centre of the Serb people. Especially important cultural centres were: Novi Sad, Sremski Karlovci, and the monasteries in Fruška Gora. In the first half of the 19th century, Novi Sad was the largest Serb city; in 1820 its population was around 20,000 inhabitants, of whom two-thirds were ethnic Serbs. The Matica Srpska moved to Novi Sad from Budapest in 1864. The Serbian gymnasiums of Novi Sad and Sremski Karlovci were at the time considered to be among the best in the Habsburg Kingdom of Hungary. It was at this time that Novi Sad began to be called the "Serbian Athens".

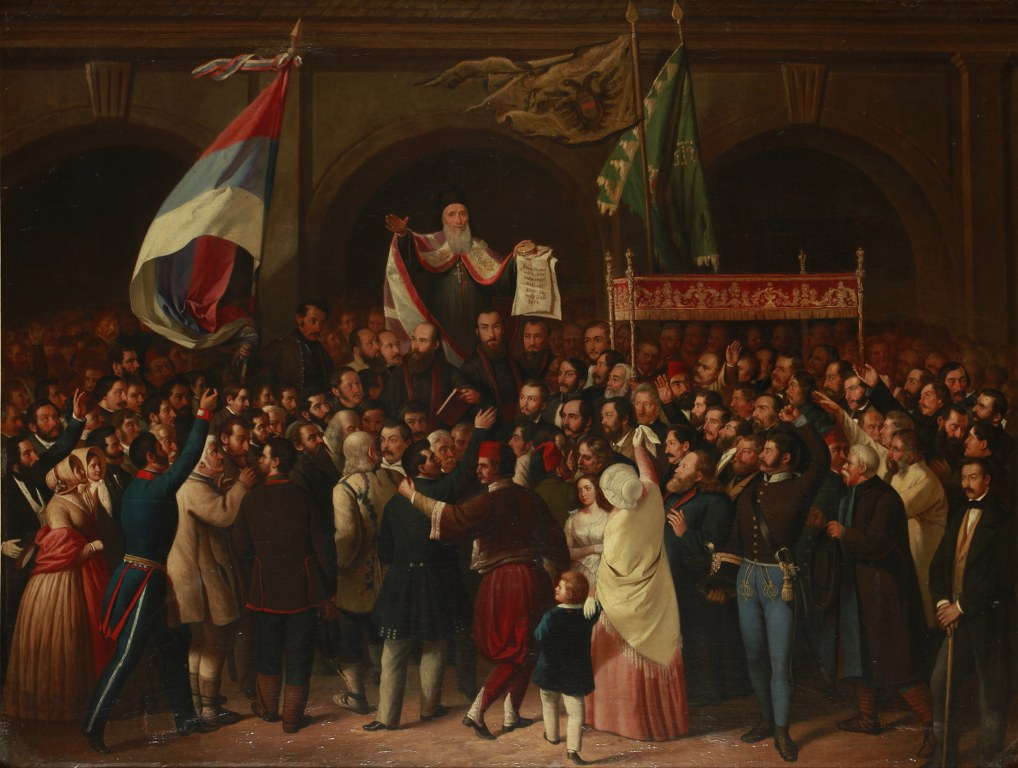
Proclamation of Serbian Vojvodina at the May Assembly, 1848

During the Revolutions of 1848, the Hungarians demanded national rights and autonomy within the Austrian Empire. However, they did not recognized the national rights of other peoples which lived in the Habsburg Kingdom of Hungary in that time. Wishing to express their ethnic and national individuality and confronted with the new Hungarian authorities, Serbs declared the constitution of the Serbian Voivodship ("Serbian Duchy") at the May Assembly in Sremski Karlovci. The Serbian Voivodship consisted of Syrmia, Bačka, Banat, and Baranya regions. A National Committee was formed as the new government of the Serbian Voivodship. The metropolitan of Sremski Karlovci, Josif Rajačić, was elected patriarch, while Stevan Šupljikac the First Voivode ("duke"). Instead of the old feudal regime a new szstem was established based on the national boards with the Head Serb National Board presiding.

The Hungarian government replied by the use of force: on June 12, 1848, a war between Serbs and Hungarians started. Austria took the side of Hungary at first, demanding from the Serbs to "go back to being obedient". Serbs were aided by volunteers from Principality of Serbia. Since the Austrian court turned against the Hungarians in the later stage of revolution, the feudal and clerical circles of Serbian Voivodship formed an alliance with Austria and became a tool of the government in Vienna. Serbian troops from the Voivodship then joined the Habsburg army and helped in crushing the revolution in the Kingdom of Hungary.

After the defeat of the Hungarian revolution, by a decision of the Austrian emperor, in November 1849, an Austrian crown land known as the Voivodeship of Serbia and Banat of Temeschwar was formed as the political successor of the Serbian Voivodship. The crown land consisted of the parts of Banat, Bačka, and Syrmia regions. An Austrian governor seated in Timișoara ruled the area, and the title of voivode belonged to the emperor himself ("Grand Voivod of the Voivodship of Serbia"). Even after this crown land was abolished, the emperor kept this title until the end of the Habsburg monarchy in 1918.

In 1860, the Voivodeship of Serbia and Banat of Temeschwar was abolished and most of its territory (Banat and Bačka) was incorporated into the Habsburg Kingdom of Hungary, although direct Hungarian rule began only in 1867, when the Kingdom of Hungary gained autonomy within the newly formed Austria-Hungary. Unlike Banat and Bačka, Syrmia was in 1860 incorporated into the Kingdom of Slavonia, another separate Habsburg crown land. However, the Kingdom of Slavonia was also incorporated into the Kingdom of Hungary in 1868. This was followed by a policy of Hungarization of the non-Hungarian ethnicities, most notably promotion of the Hungarian language and suppression of Slavic languages (including Serbian). The franchise was greatly restricted so as to keep power in the hands of the Hungarians. The new government of the autonomous Kingdom of Hungary, took the stance that the Kingdom of Hungary should be a Hungarian nation state, and that all other peoples living in the Kingdom (Germans, Jews, Romanians, Poles, Slovaks, Ruthenes, Serbs, and others) should be assimilated. Finally, the privileges given to Serbs by the Habsburg emperor in 1690, were abolished in 1912.

=== Yugoslavia and Serbia ===
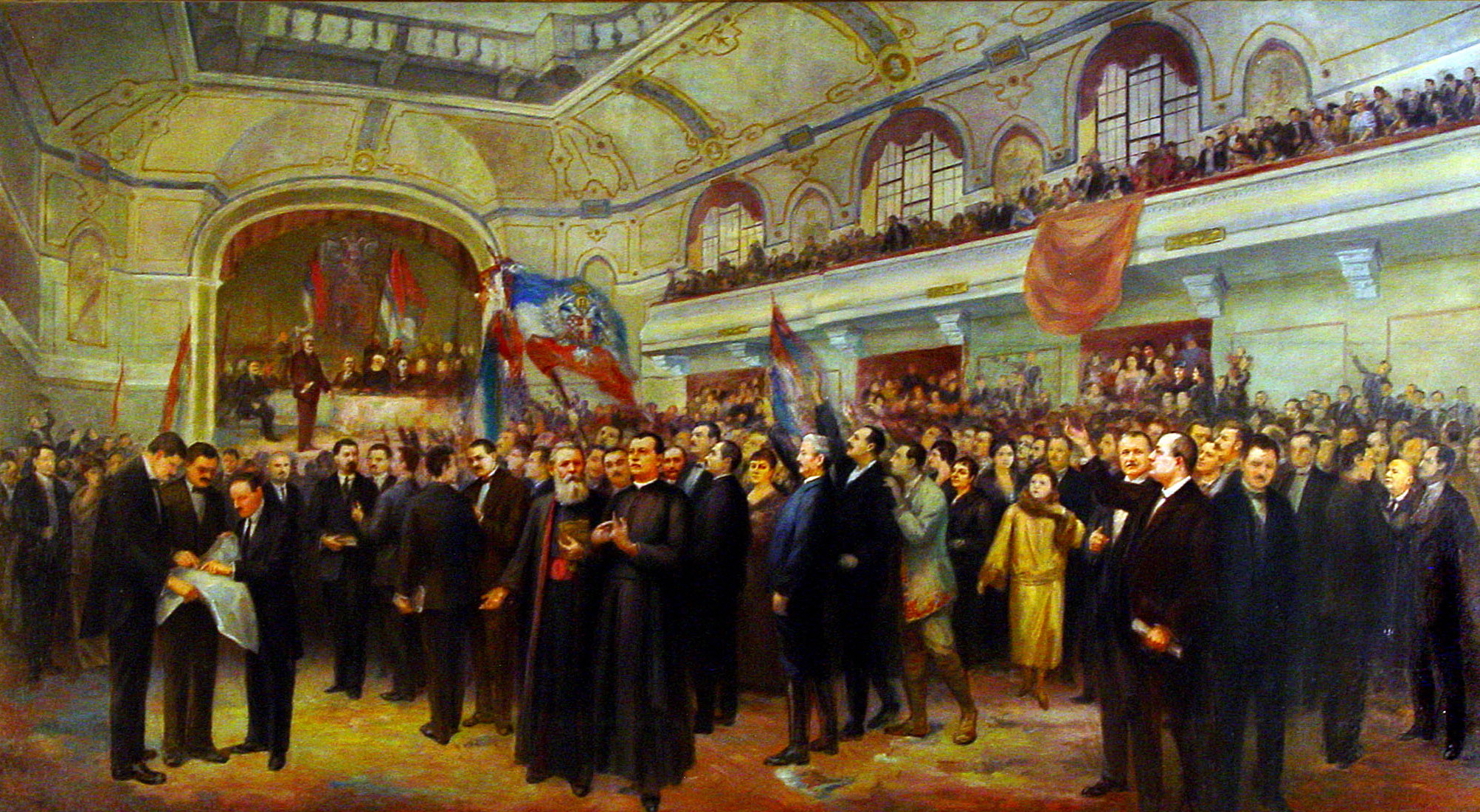
Proclamation of the unification of Vojvodina region with the Kingdom of Serbia by the Great National Assembly in Novi Sad, 1918

At the end of World War I, the Austria-Hungary collapsed. On 31 October 1918, the Banat Republic was proclaimed in Timișoara. The government of Hungary recognized its independence, but it was short-lived. On 24 November 1918, the Assembly of Syrmia proclaimed the unification of Syrmia with Serbia. The following day, the Great National Assembly in Novi Sad also proclaimed the unification of Banat, Bačka and Baranja with the Kingdom of Serbia. The assembly numbered 757 deputies, of which 578 were Serbs, 84 Bunjevci, 62 Slovaks, 21 Rusyns, 6 Germans, 3 Šokci, 2 Croats, and 1 Hungarian. On 1 December 1918, Vojvodina, as part of the Kingdom of Serbia, became part of the Kingdom of Serbs, Croats and Slovenes.

During World War II, Nazi Germany and its allies, Hungary and the Independent State of Croatia, occupied Vojvodina and divided it among themselves. Bačka and Baranya were annexed by Hungary while Syrmia was included in the Independent State of Croatia. The rest of former Danube Banovina (including Banat, Šumadija, and Braničevo) was designated as part of the area governed by the German Military Administration in Serbia. The administrative center of this smaller province was Smederevo. The occupying powers committed numerous attrocities against the civilian population; the Jewish population of Vojvodina was almost completely killed or deported. In total, Axis occupational authorities killed about 50,000 people in Vojvodina (mostly Serbs, Jews, and Roma) while more than 280,000 people were interned, arrested, or tortured. In 1942, in the Novi Sad Raid, a military operation carried out by the Royal Hungarian Army, resulted in the deaths of 3,000–4,000 civilians. Under the Hungarian authority, 19,573 people were killed in Bačka, of which the majority of victims were of Serbs, Jews, and Roma.

The region was politically restored in 1944 (incorporating Syrmia, Banat, Bačka, and Baranya) and became an autonomous province of Serbia in 1945. Instead of the previous name (Danube Banovina), the region regained its historical name of Vojvodina, while its administrative center remained Novi Sad. When the final borders of Vojvodina were defined, Baranya was assigned to Croatia, while the northern part of the Mačva region was assigned to Vojvodina.

During the 1990s, Vojvodina underwent significant social changes amid the broader context of the dissolution of Yugoslavia and subsequent Yugoslav Wars. Although Vojvodina was spared direct armed conflict, it felt the indirect effects as large influxes of Serb refugees from Croatia and Bosnia and Herzegovina, settled in Vojvodina (primarily Syrmia and southern Bačka) significantly altering the demographic and social makeup of the province. At the same time, significant number of ethnic minorities, primarily Croats and Hungarians, emigrated.

== Demographics ==
Serbs make up majority in 26 of 37 cities and municipalities in Vojvodina. Cities and municipalities with an ethnic Serb majority are: Pećinci (89.3%), Sremska Mitrovica (86.1%), Titel (85.6%), Inđija (85.5%), Opovo (84.7%), Ruma (84.6%), Žabalj (82.6%), Stara Pazova (82.6%), Odžaci (82.4%), Irig (79.5%), Sremski Karlovci (79.3%), Šid (79.3%), Pančevo (79.2%), Bačka Palanka (78.8%), Novi Sad (78.3%), Kovin (76.9%), Zrenjanin (76.6%), Kikinda (75.8%), Bela Crkva (75.1%), Vršac (72.1%), Temerin (69.8%), Beočin (69.4%), Sečanj (68.8%), Novi Bečej (68.4%), Srbobran (67.7%), Nova Crnja (67.2%), Sombor (63.7%), Žitište (62.7%), Apatin (62.6%), Kula (62.4%), Vrbas (62.1%), Alibunar (58.5%), Novi Kneževac (58%), and Plandište (58%). Serbs form relative majority of the population in Bač (45.6%), Bečej (42.3%), and Subotica (34.3%).

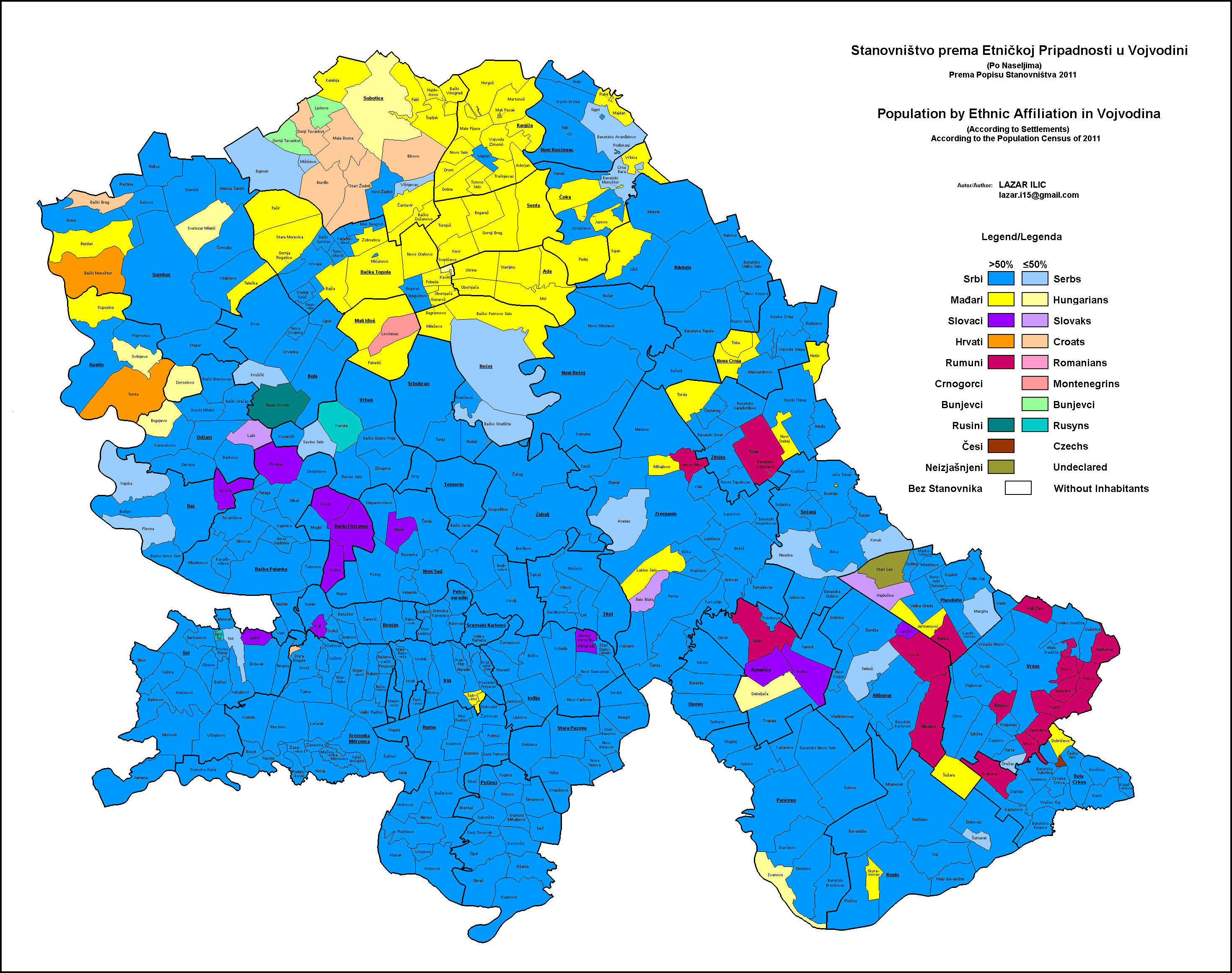
Ethnic map of Vojvodina by settlements, 2011

Year	Population	Share
1910	510,186	33.8%
1921	526,134	34.7%
1931	528,000	33.0%
1941	577,067	35.3%
1948	841,246	50.6%
1953	865,538	50.9%
1961	1,017,713	54.9%
1971	1,089,132	55.8%
1981	1,107,735	54.4%
1991	1,151,353	57.2%
2002	1,321,807	65.0%
2011	1,289,635	66.7%
2022	1,190,785	68.4%

== Heritage ==
Serbs of Vojvodina served as the cultural hub for entire Serbdom during the 18th and 19th centuries. They made enduring impacts across multiple domains, blending Eastern Orthodox heritage with Western European influences. They pioneered Serbian national literature, first among South Slavs established newspapers and literary societies. They established the first Serbian elementary school (1703, in Bečej), Serbian gymnasiums (Sremski Karlovci Gymnasium in 1791 and Novi Sad Gymnasium in 1810), first theatre (Serbian National Theatre in 1861). The oldest matica in the world, Matica srpska, was founded in 1826. Also, the second oldest Eastern Orthodox seminary in the world was founded in Sremski Karlovci in 1794, the Sremski Karlovci Orthodox Seminary.

The Fruška Gora mountain hosts 17 Serbian Orthodox monasteries, dating back centuries, such as Krušedol and Novo Hopovo.

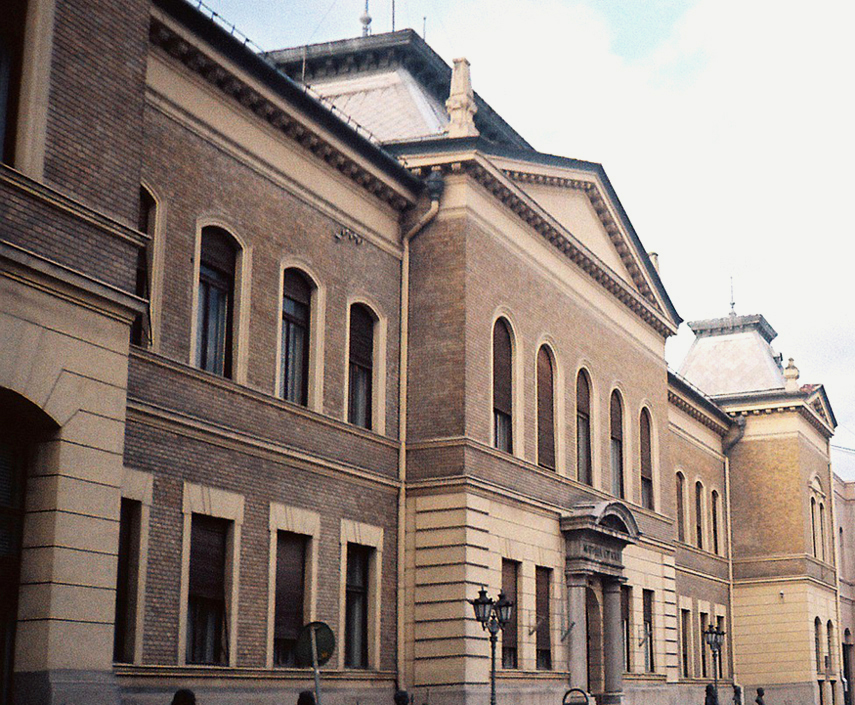
Matica srpska, Novi Sad

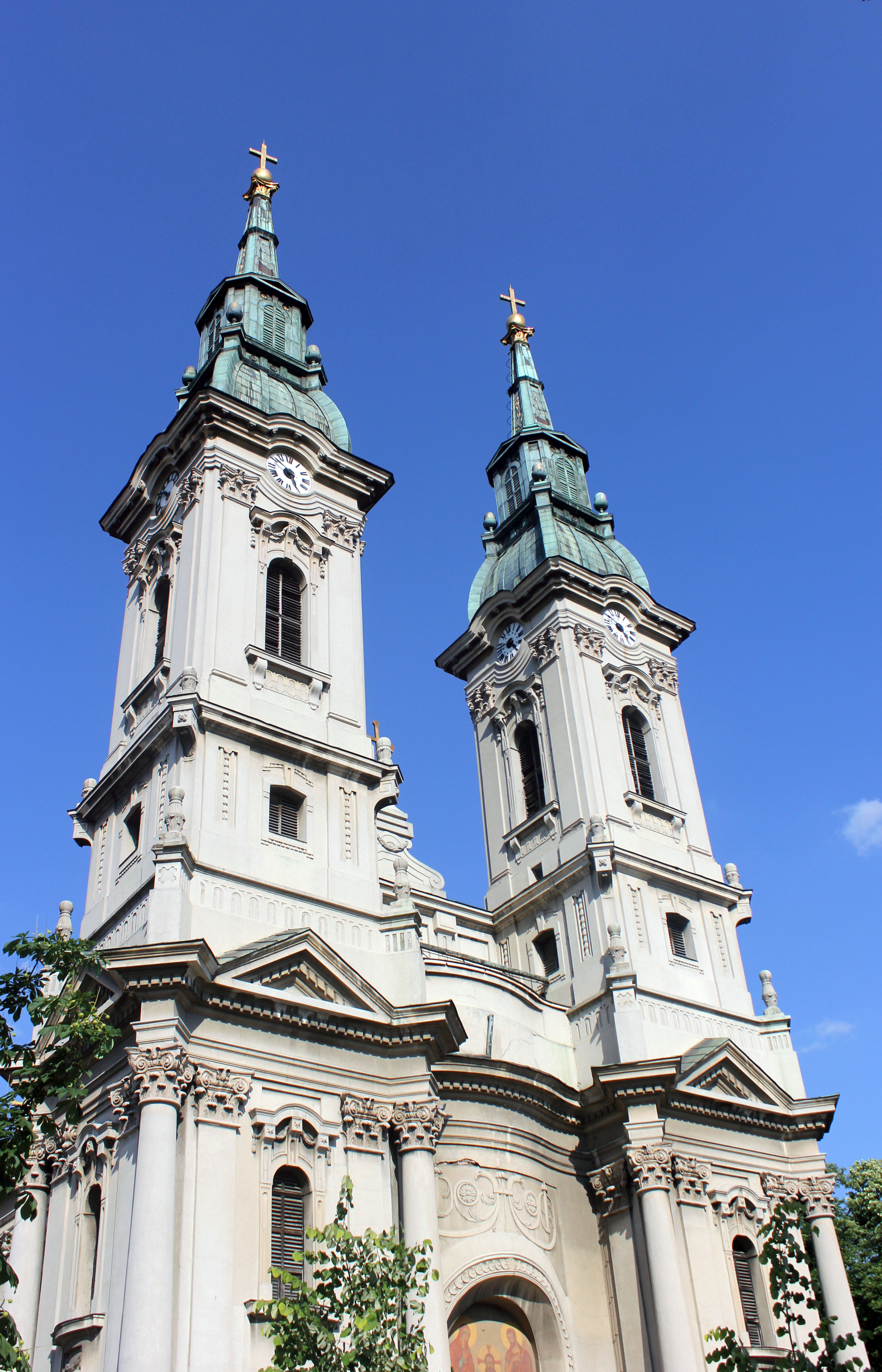
Church of the Assumption of the Theotokos, Pančevo

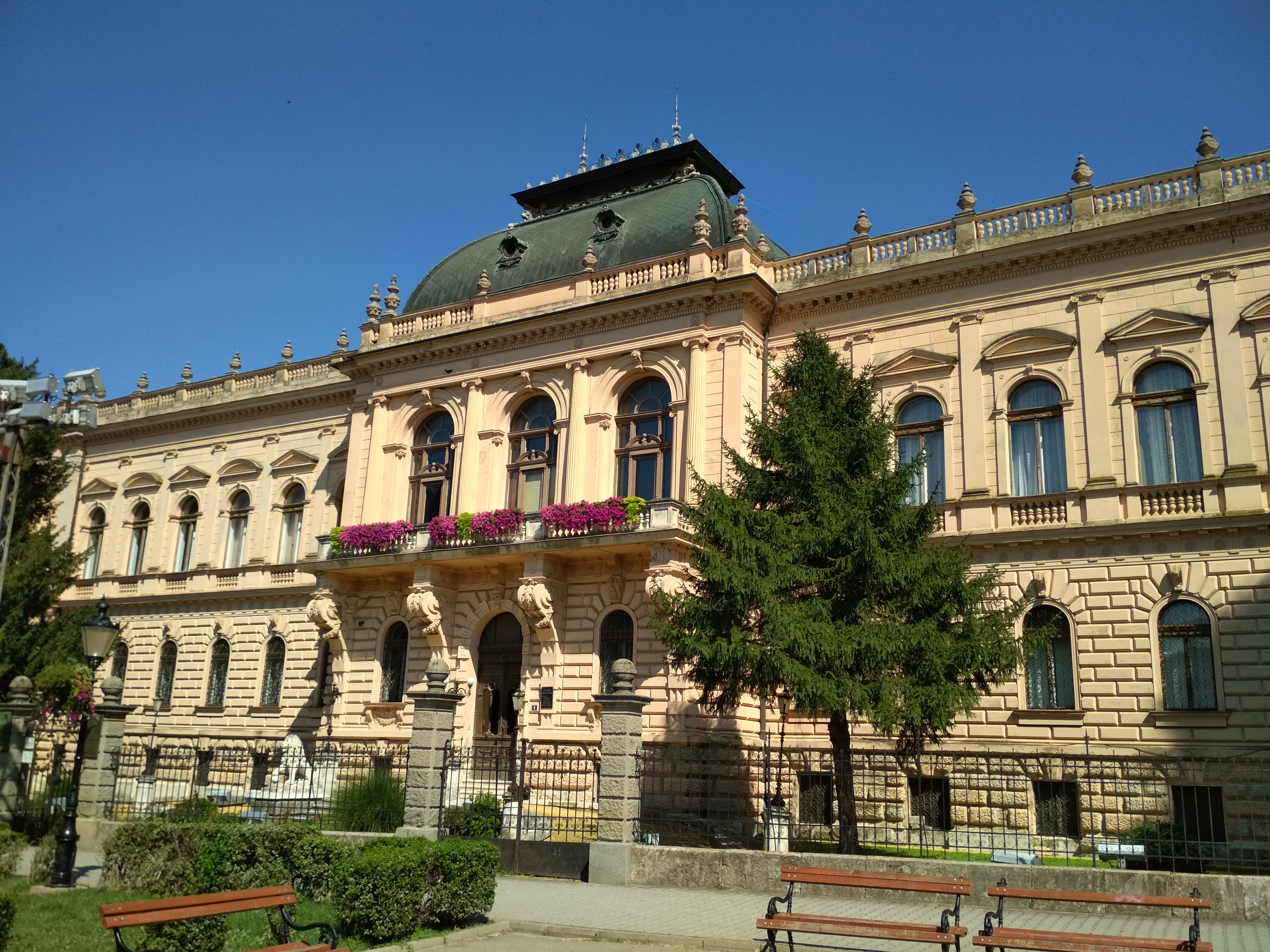
Palace of the Patriarchate, Sremski Karlovci

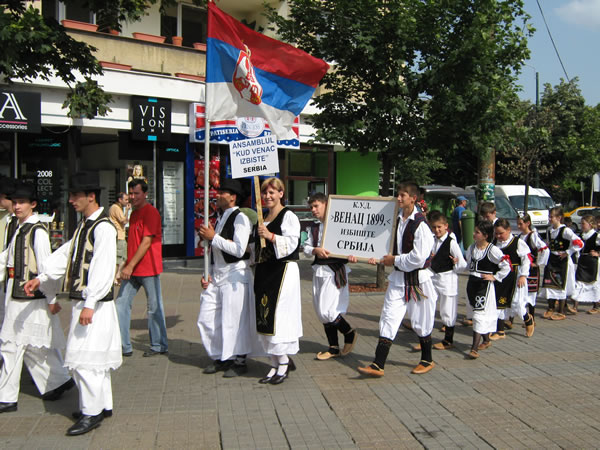
Traditional folk costume of Serbs in Banat

== Notable people ==
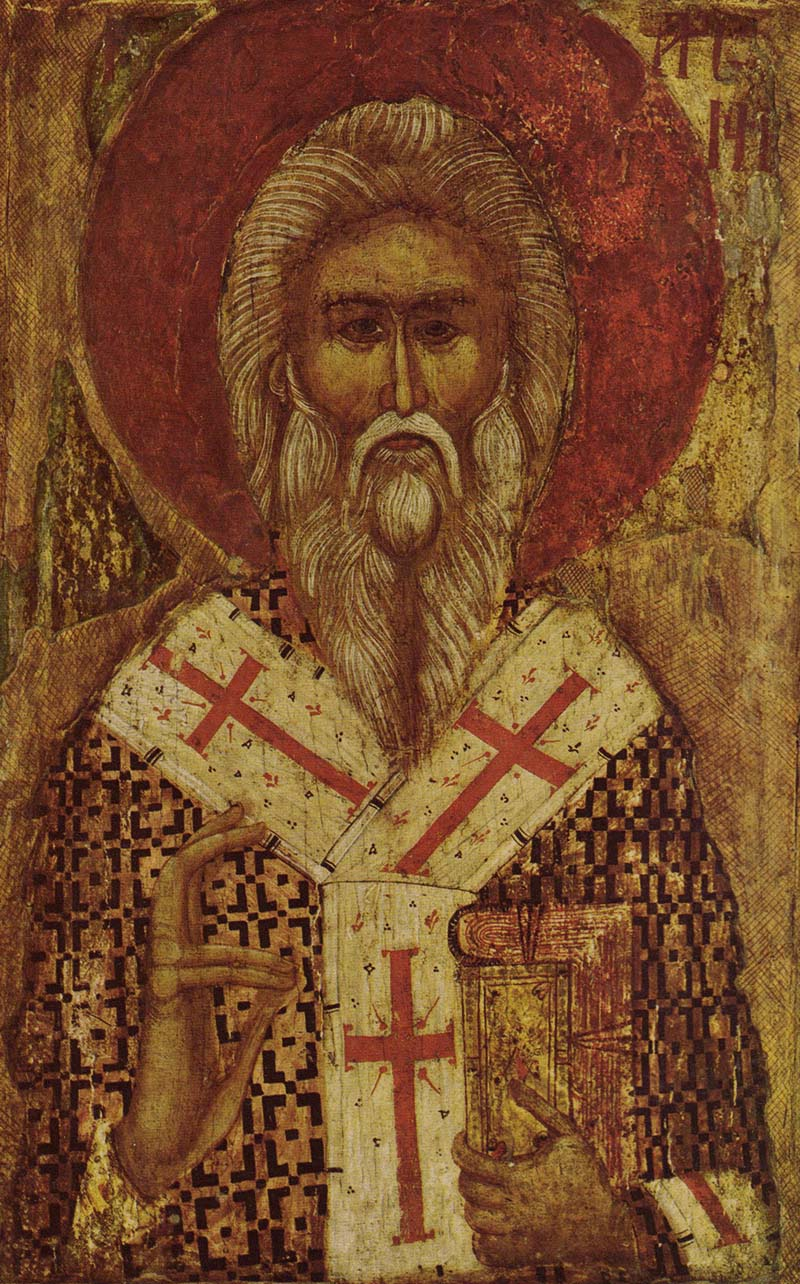
Arsenije Sremac

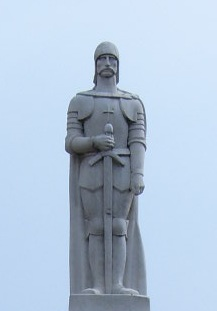
Jovan Nenad

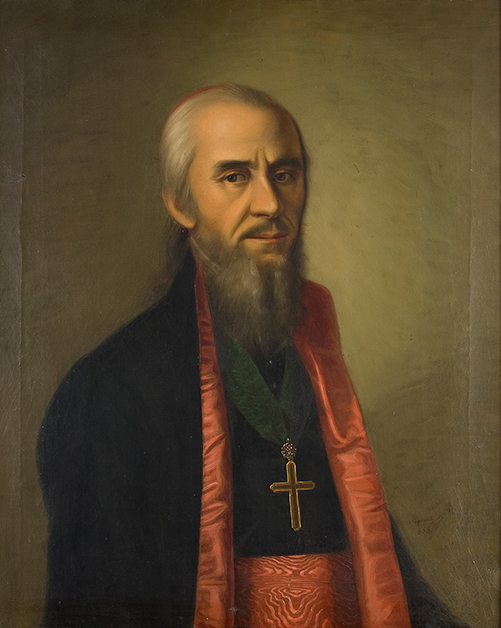
Lukijan Mušicki

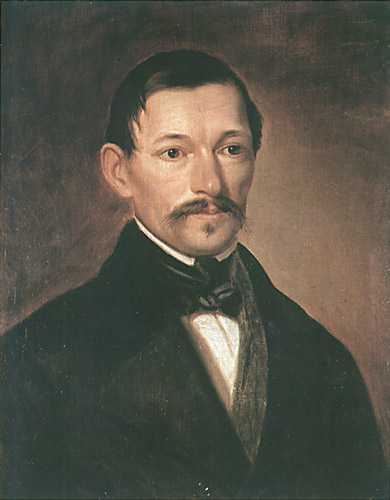
Jovan Sterija Popović

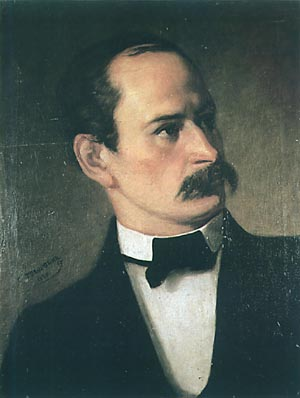
Đura Daničić

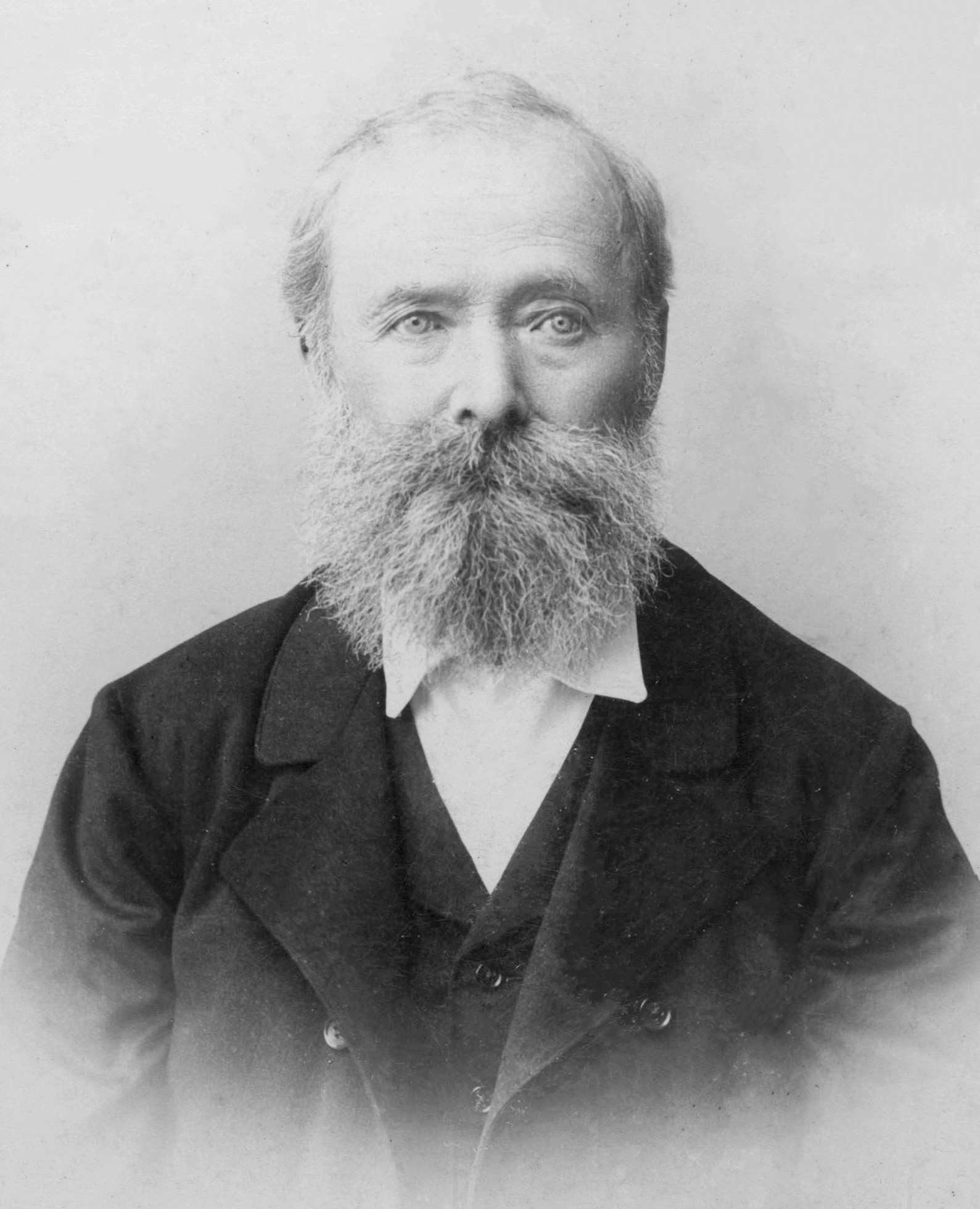
Svetozar Miletić

Đura Jakšić

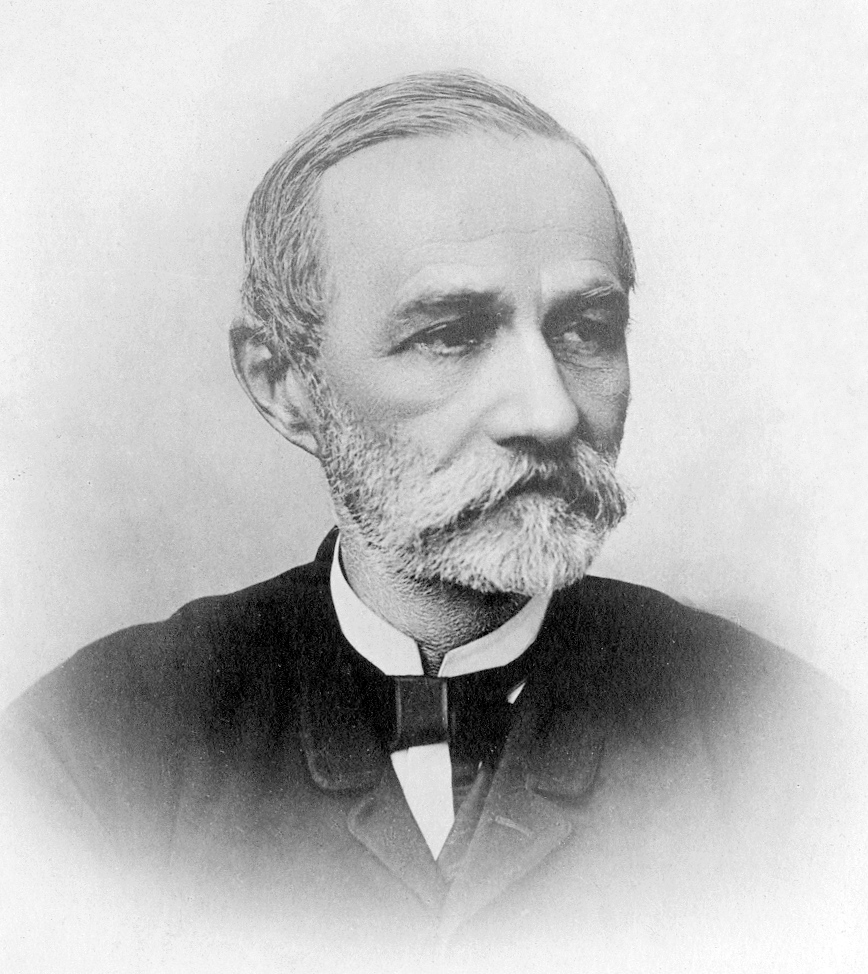
Jovan Jovanović Zmaj

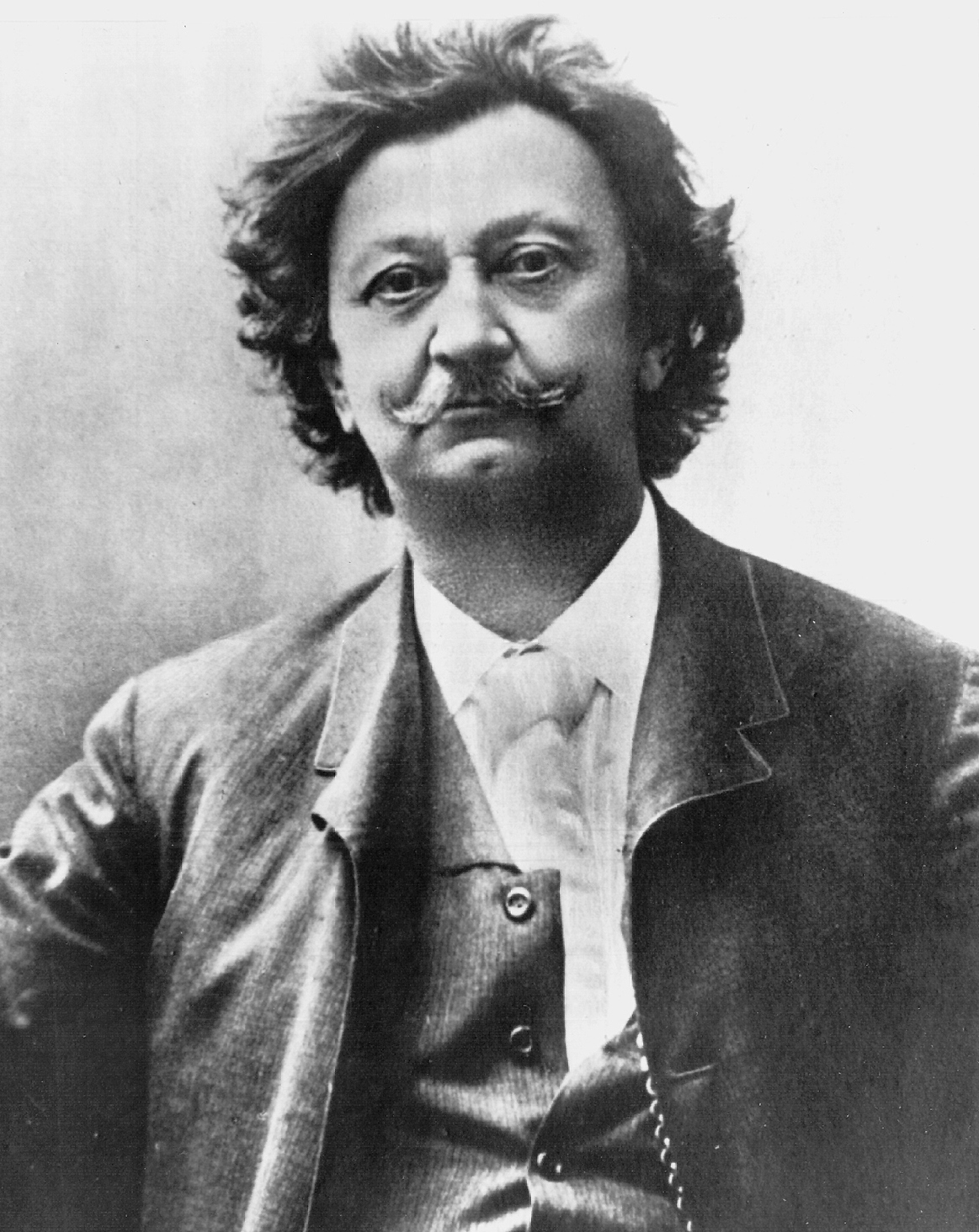
Laza Kostić

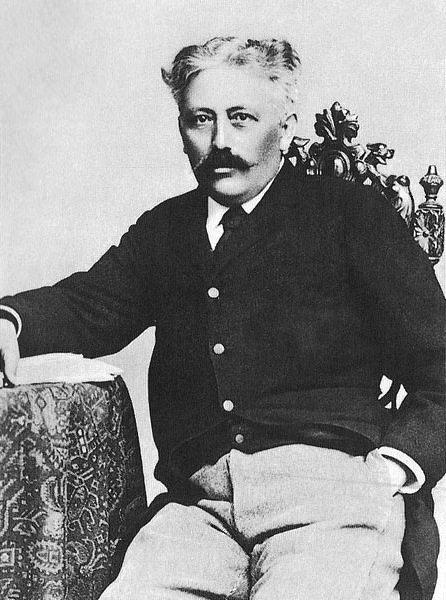
Stevan Sremac

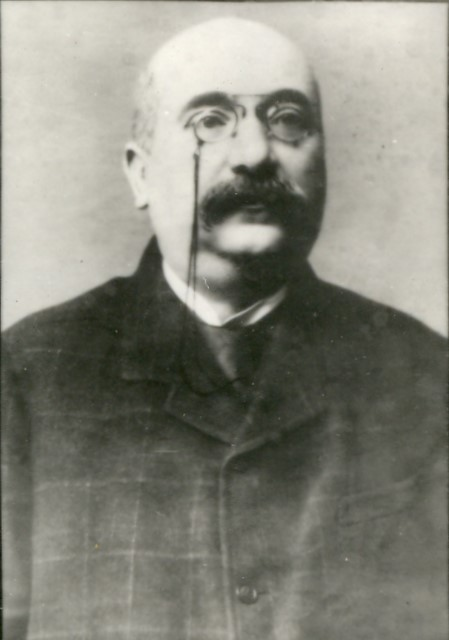
Jaša Tomić

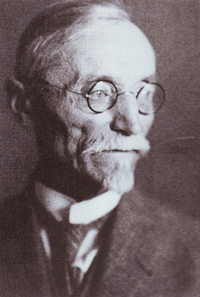
Uroš Predić

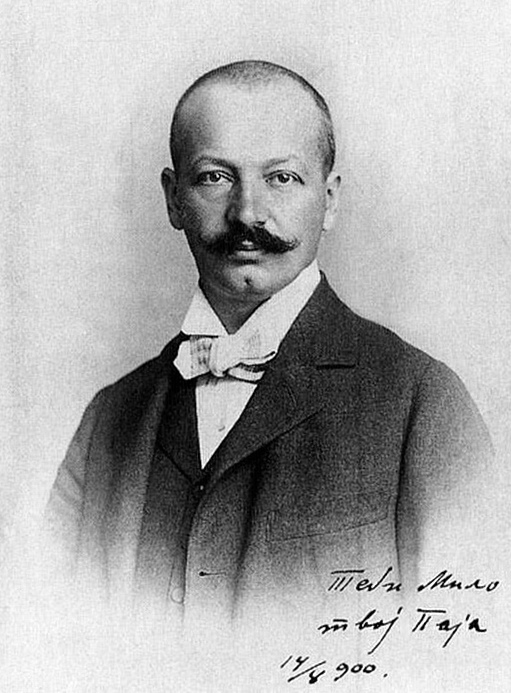
Paja Jovanović

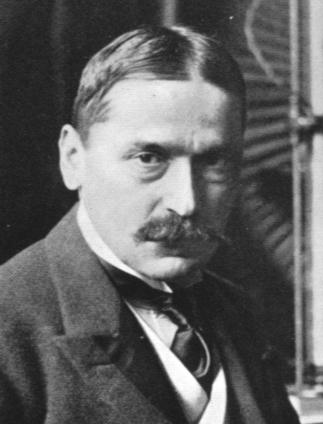
Mihajlo Pupin

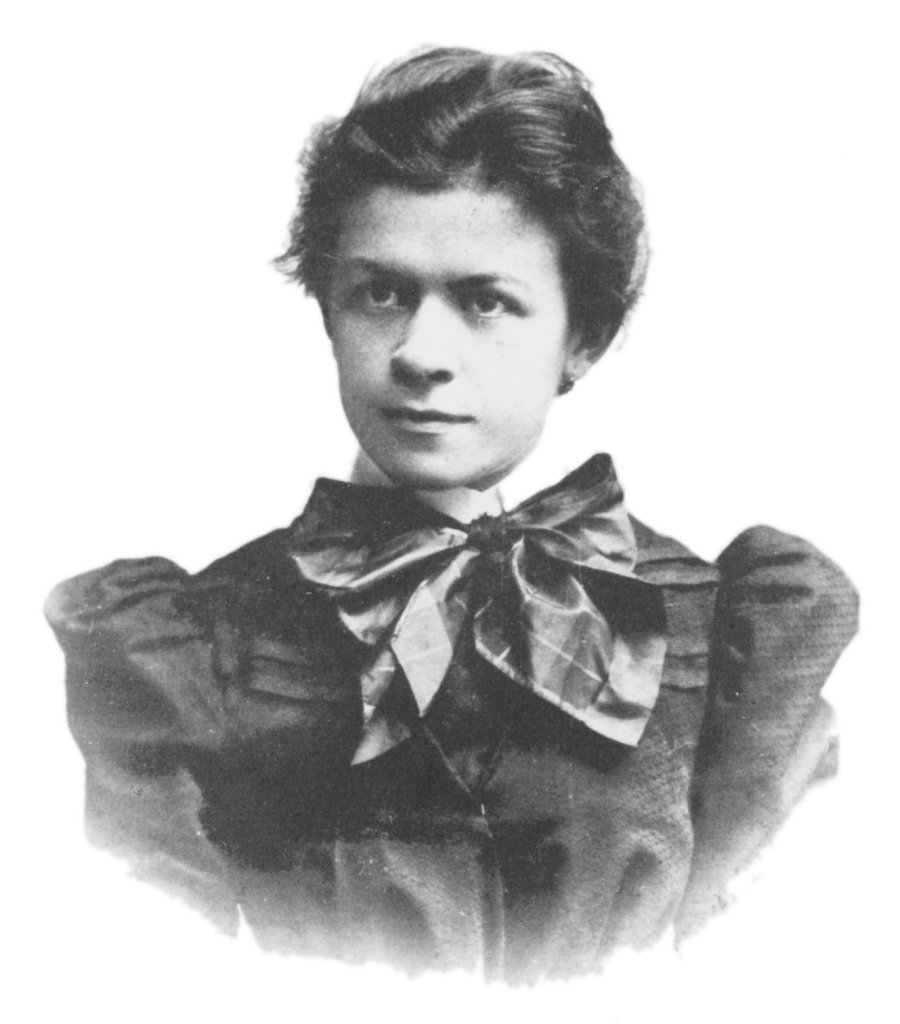
Mileva Marić

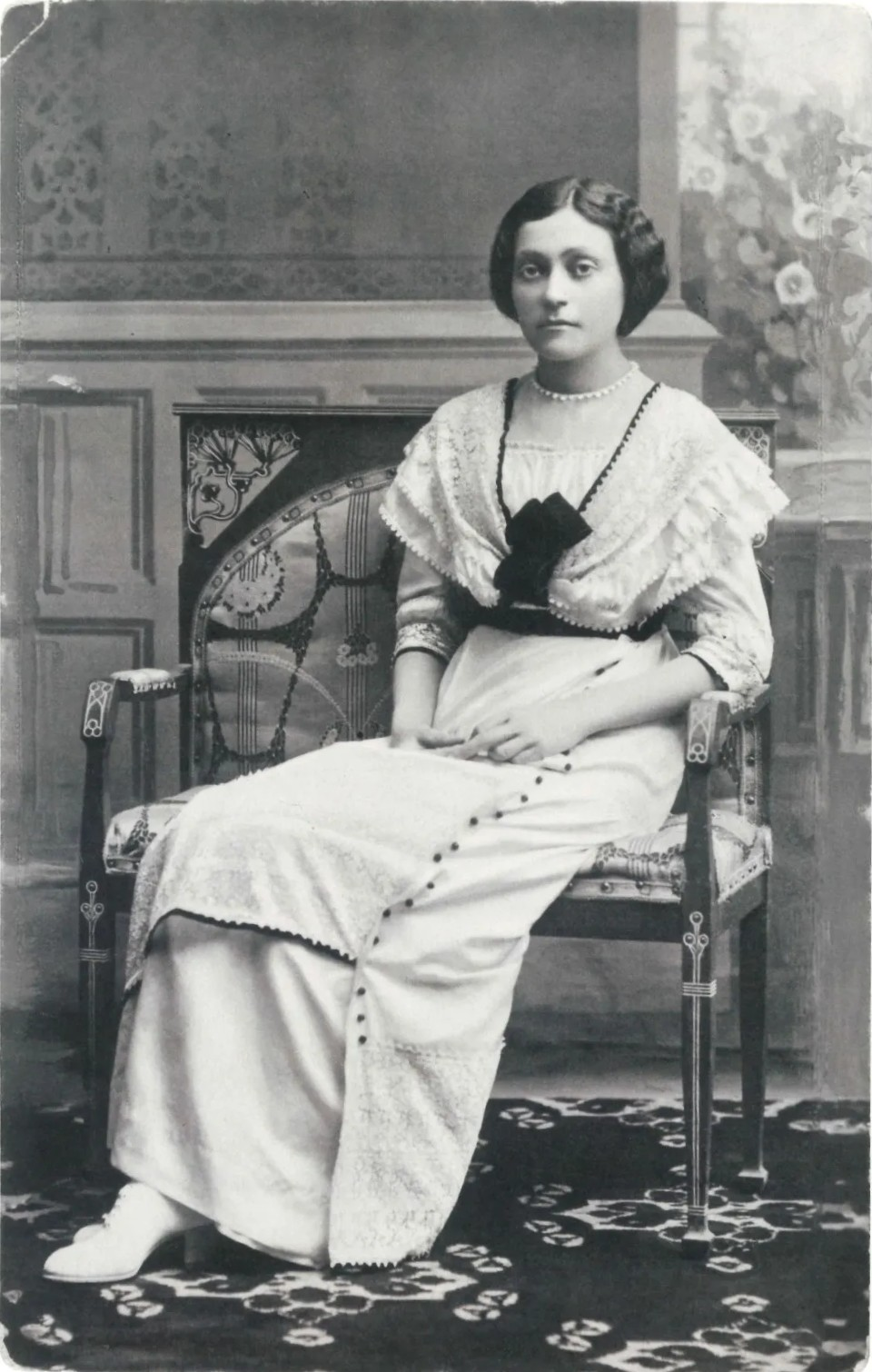
Isidora Sekulić

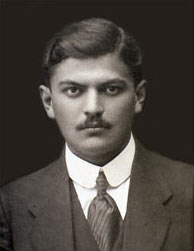
Sava Šumanović

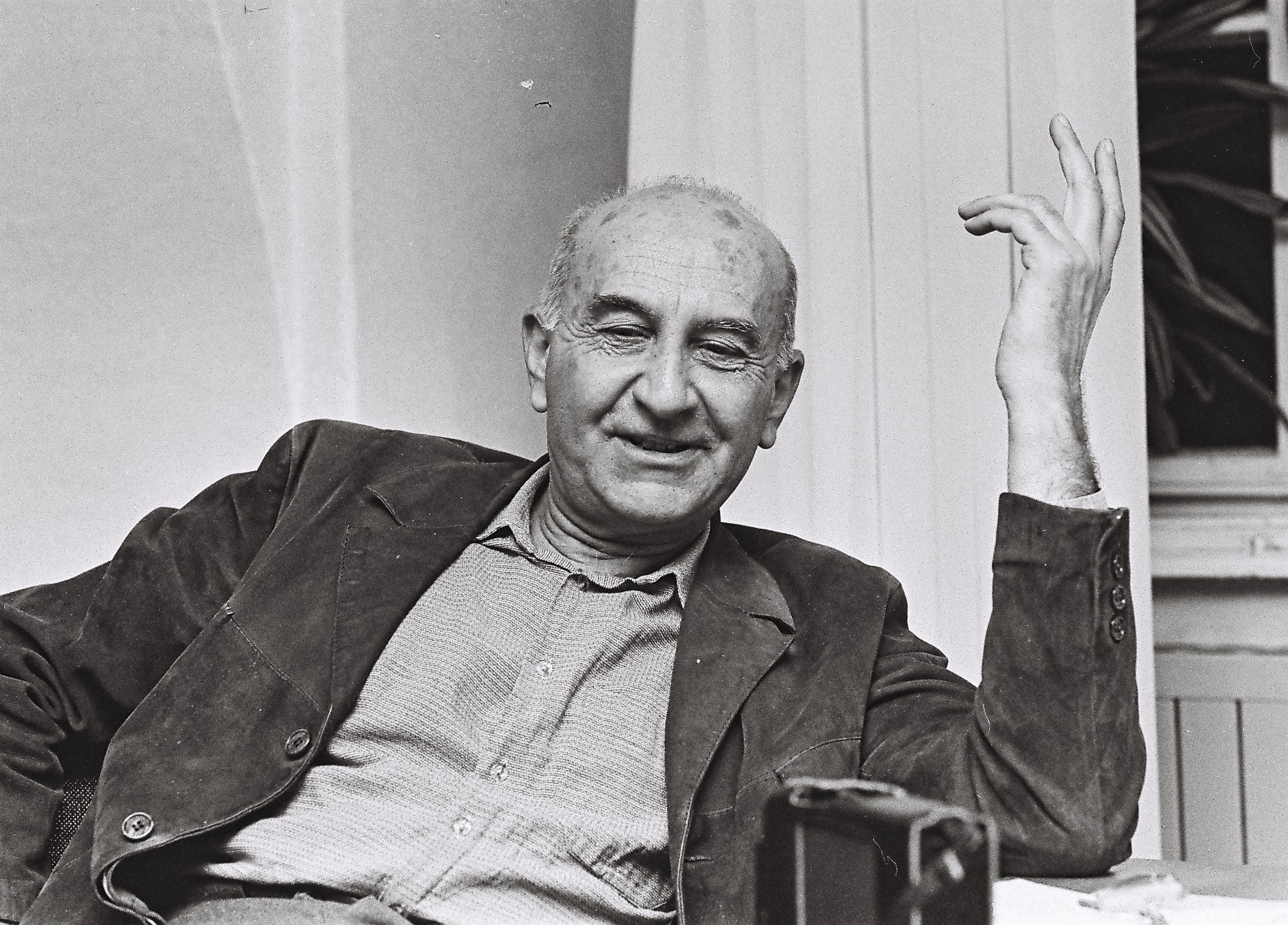
Aleksandar Tišma

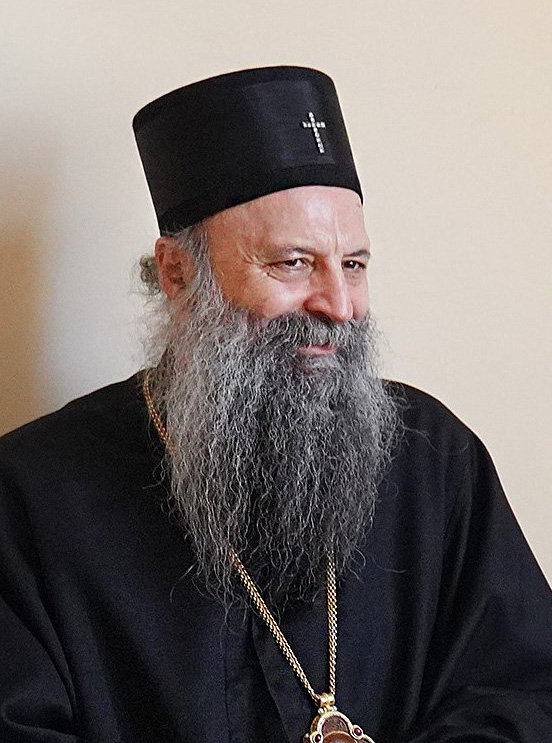
Porfirije

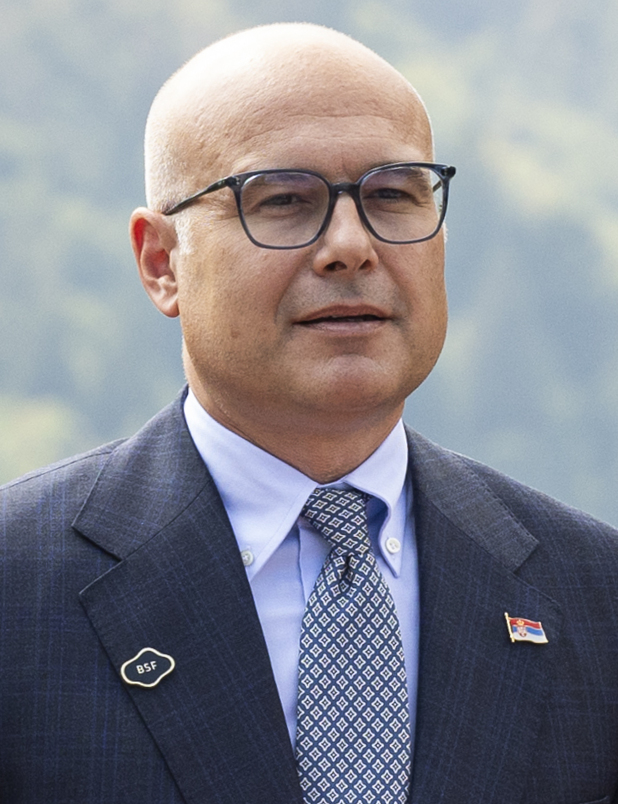
Miloš Vučević

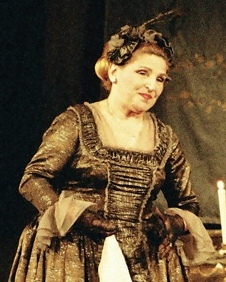
Mira Banjac

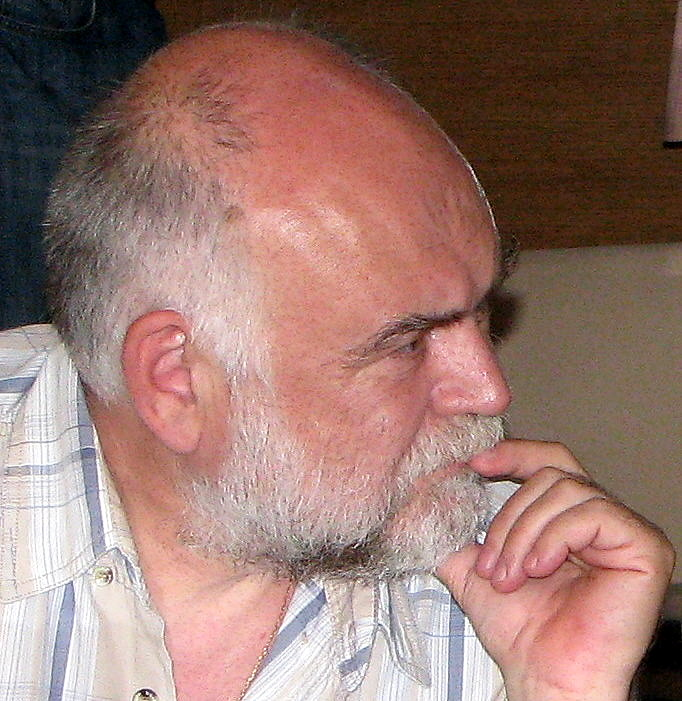
Aleksandar Berček

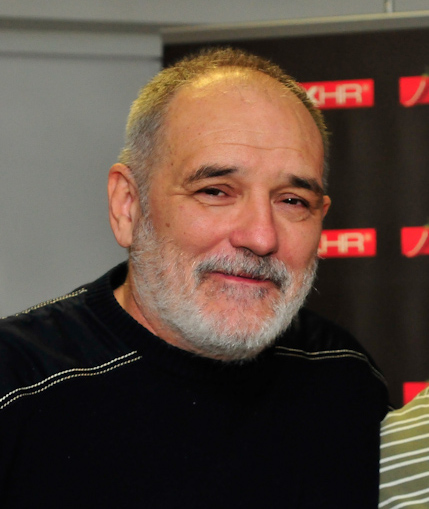
Đorđe Balašević

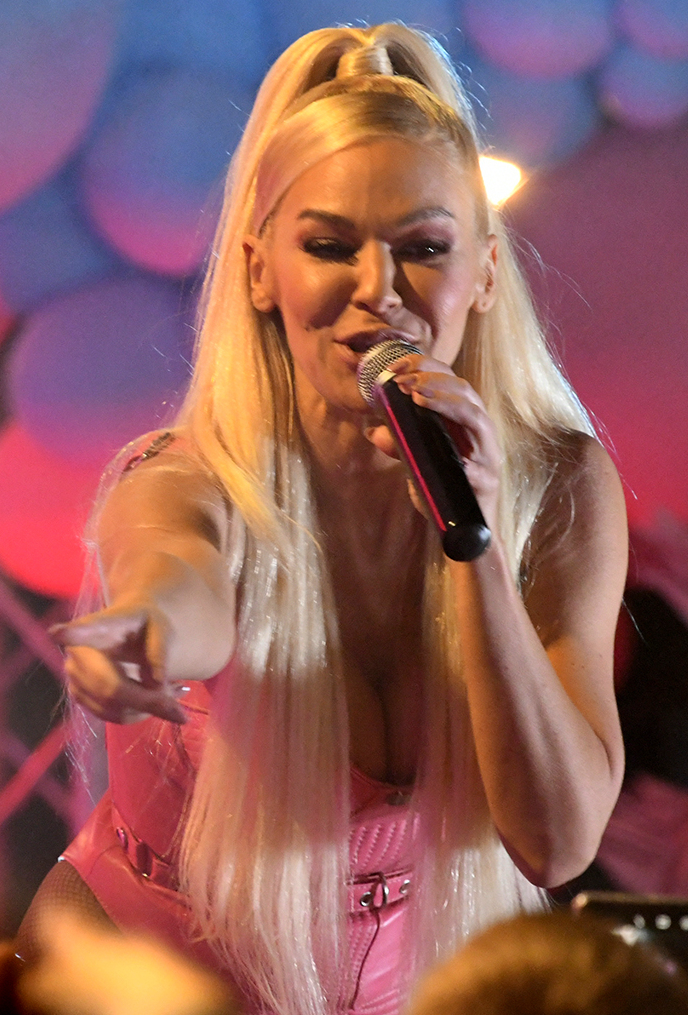
Nataša Bekvalac

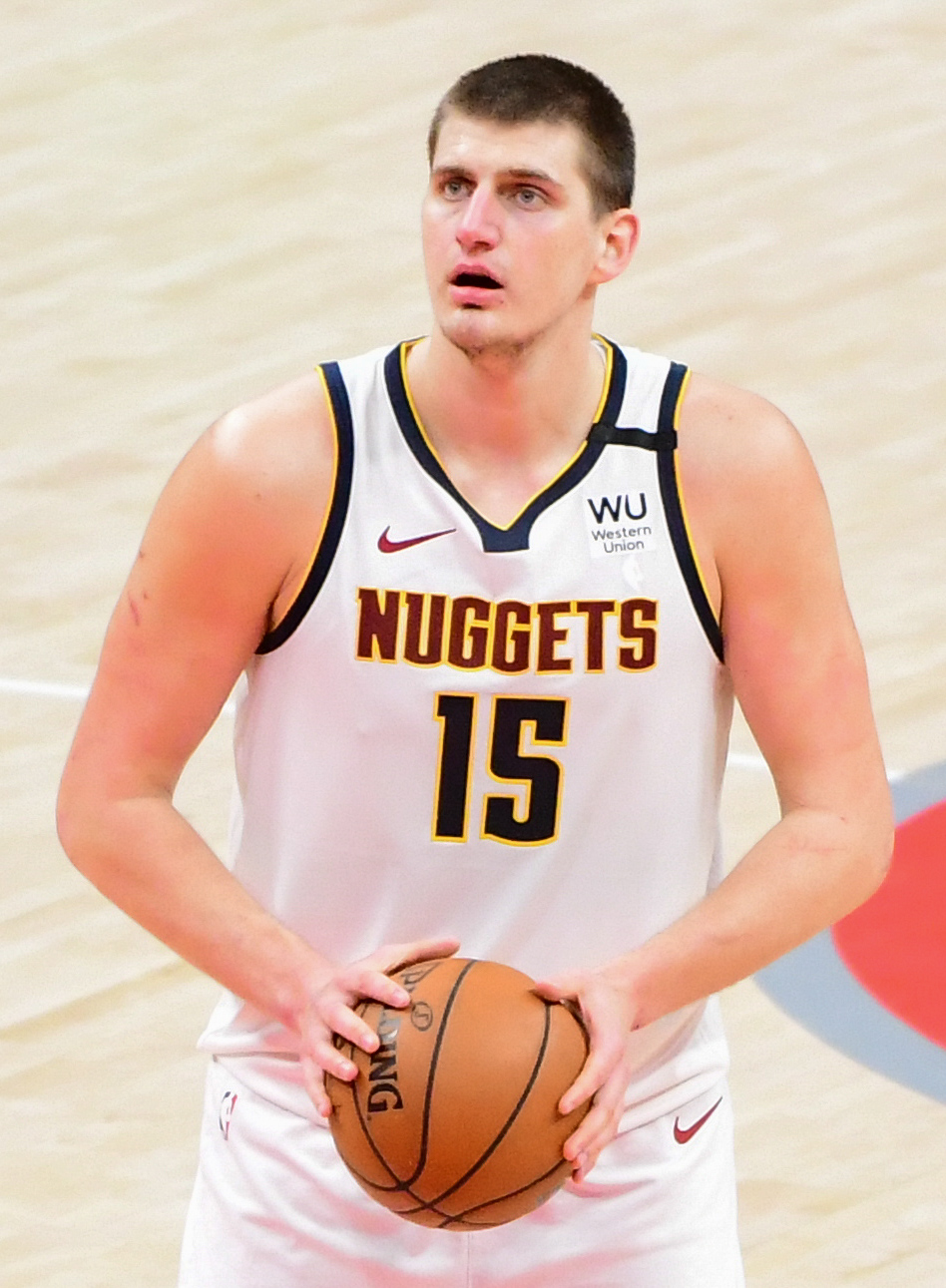
Nikola Jokić

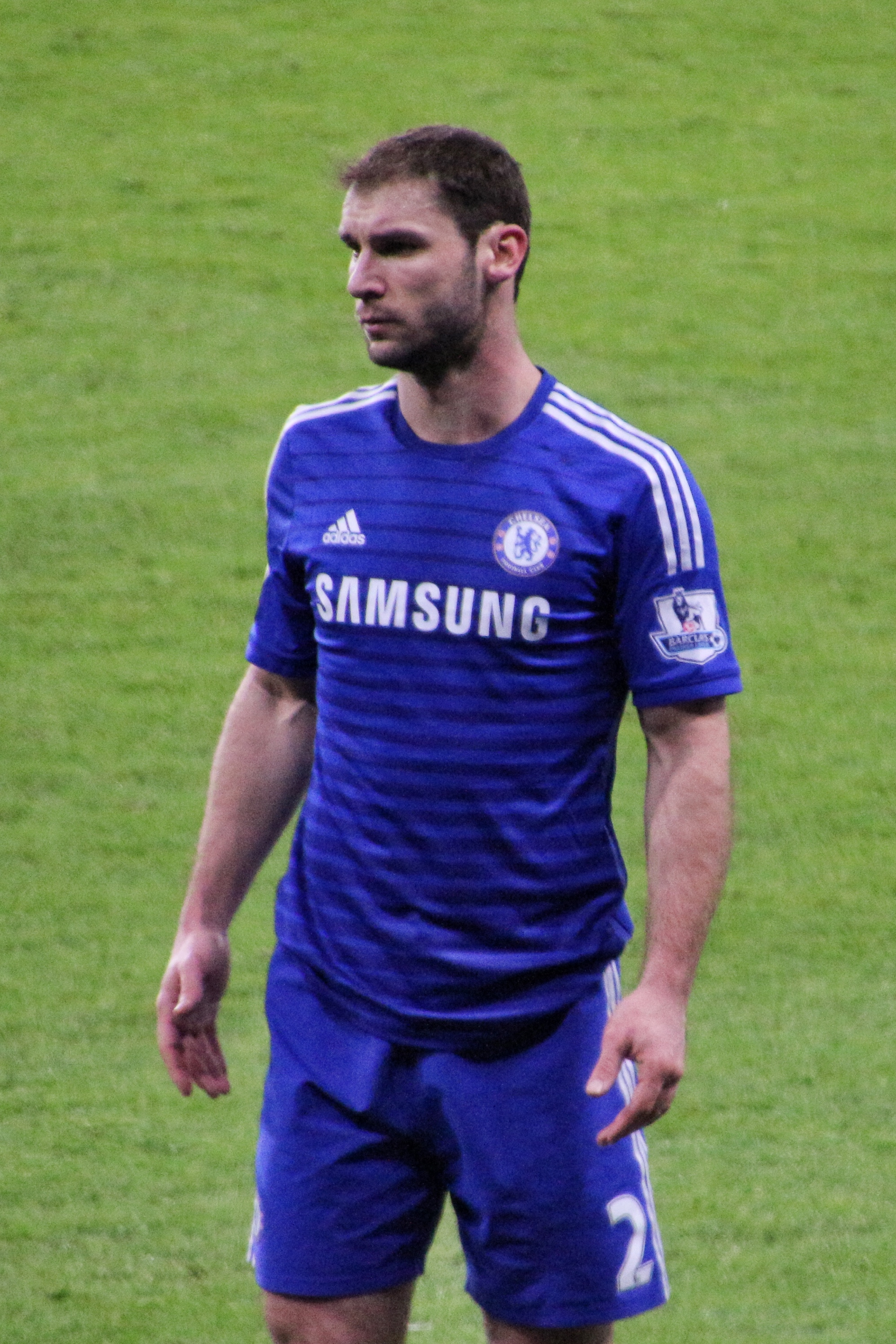
Branislav Ivanović

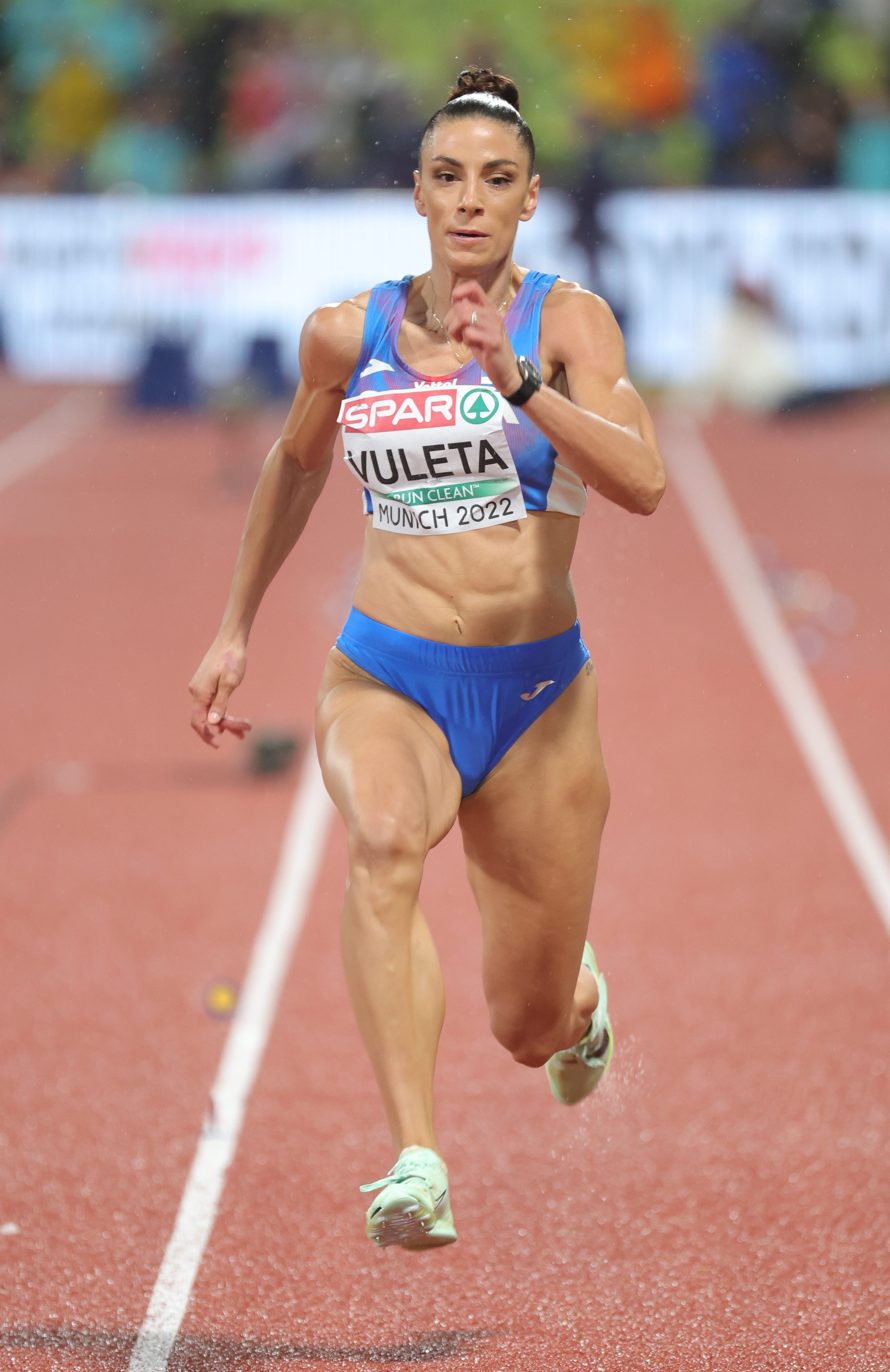
Ivana Španović

- Mika Antić – poet
- Isidor Bajić – composer
- Đorđe Balašević – singer
- Mira Banjac – actress
- Nataša Bekvalac – singer
- Aleksandar Berček – actor
- Dejan Bodiroga – basketball player
- Slobodan Boškan – volleyball player
- Vujadin Boškov – football player and manager
- Branimir Brstina – actor
- Dara Bubamara – singer
- Petar Drapšin – Yugoslav Partisan commander
- Nenad Čanak – politician
- Vesna Čipčić – actress
- Miloš Ćuk – water polo player
- Đura Daničić – philologist
- Jovan Đorđević – theatrical and public worker
- Jasna Đuričić – actress
- Andrija Gerić – volleyball player
- Maja Gojković – politician
- Vladimir Grbić – volleyball player
- Nikola Grbić – volleyball player and coach
- Boris Isaković – actor
- Branislav Ivanović – football player
- Aleksandra Ivošev – shooter
- Đura Jakšić – poet
- Đurica Jojkić – politician
- Slaviša Jokanović – football player and manager
- Nikola Jokić – basketball player
- Đorđe Jovanović – sculptor
- Jovan Jovanović Zmaj – poet
- Paja Jovanović – painter
- Slobodan Jovanović – politician, jurist, and historian
- Toša Jovanović – actor
- Darko Kovačević – football player
- Aleksandar Kolarov – football player
- Milan Konjović – painter
- Laza Kostić – poet
- Đorđe Krstić – painter
- Mileva Marić – physicist
- Svetozar Miletić – politician
- Branislav Mitrović – water polo player
- Lukijan Mušicki – poet
- Jovan Nenad – self-proclaimed "emperor"
- Tihomir Novakov – physicist
- Bojan Pajtić – politician
- Veljko Petrović – poet
- Duško Pijetlović – water polo player
- Duško Popov – intelligence officer
- Jovan Sterija Popović – playwright and poet
- Porfirije – Serbian Patriarch
- Uroš Predić – painter
- Mihajlo Pupin – physicist
- Jovan Rajić – writer and historian
- Momir Rnić – handball player
- Isidora Sekulić – writer
- Arsenije Sremac – the second Serbian Archbishop
- Stevan Sremac – writer
- Vasa Stajić – philosopher and writer
- Stanoje Stanojević – historian
- Milica Stojadinović-Srpkinja – poet
- Jovan Subotić – politician
- Žarko Šešum – handball player
- Ivana Španović – track and field athlete
- Sava Šumanović – painter
- Dušan Tadić – football player
- Tea Tairović – singer
- Momčilo Tapavica – Olympian
- Lazar Telecki – actor
- Aleksandar Tišma – writer
- Jaša Tomić – politician
- Marija Trandafil – philanthropist
- Kosta Trifković – writer
- Jovan Veselinov – politician
- Todor Veselinović – football player
- Radovan Vlajković – politician
- Miloš Vučević – politician
- Dragutin Zelenović – politician

== See also ==
- Prečani

== Sources ==
- Gavrilović, Vladan (1995). Srbi u gradovima srema: 1790–1849; kulturno-politička zbivanja. Nevkoš i Istočnik.
- Ivić, Aleksa (1929). Istorija srba u Vojvodini. Novi Sad: Matice srpska.
- Ivić, Aleksa (1914). Историја Срба у Угарској: од пада Смедерева до сеобе под Чарнојевићем (1459–1690). Zagreb: Привредникова.
- Kostić, Lazo M. (1999). Srpska Vojvodina i njene manjine: demografsko-etnografska studija. Dobrica knjiga.
- Popović, Dušan J. (1957). Srbi u Vojvodini (1): Od najstarijih vremena do Karlovačkog mira 1699. Matica srpska.
- Popović, Dušan J. (1959). Srbi u Vojvodini (2): Od Karlovačkog mira 1699 do Temišvarskog sabora. Matica srpska.
- Popović, Dušan J. (1963). Srbi u Vojvodini (3): Od Temišvarskog sabora do Blagoveštenskog sabora 1861. Matica srpska.
- Rascia – Časopis o Srbima u Vojvodini [Rascia - A magazine about Serbs in Vojvodina] (in Bosnian), vol. 1, Vršac, May 1996
- Trifunović, Stanko (1997). "Slovenska naselja V-VIII veka u Bačkoj i Banatu". Novi Sad: Muzej Vojvodine.
- Vlahović, Petar (1977). "Миграциони процеси и етничка структура Војводине". Гласник Етнографског музеја. 41. Archived from the original on 2017-04-28.
- Vojvođani o Vojvodini: povodom desetogodišnjice oslobođenja i ujedinjenja. Udruženje Vojvođana. 1928.
- Milan Tutorov, Mala Raška a u Banatu, Zrenjanin, 1991.
- Drago Njegovan, Prisajedinjenje Vojvodine Srbiji, Novi Sad, 2004.
- Radmilo Petrović, Vojvodina, Beograd, 2003.
- Dragomir Jankov, Vojvodina – propadanje jednog regiona, Novi Sad, 2004.
- Dejan Mikavica, Srpska Vojvodina u Habsburškoj Monarhiji 1690–1920, Novi Sad, 2005.
- Branislav Bukurov, Bačka, Banat i Srem, Novi Sad, 1978.
- Miodrag Milin, Vekovima zajedno, Temišvar, 1995.
