= Žarko =

Žarko (Serbian Cyrillic: Жарко, pronounced [zǎːrko]) is a South Slavic male given name used in former Yugoslavia. It originated in Serbia and is used predominantly by ethnic Serbs. It may refer to:

- Žarko (nobleman), a 14th-century Serbian nobleman
- Zarko Jukic (born 1993), Danish basketballer
- Žarko Paspalj, Yugoslav/Serbian basketballer
- Žarko Obradović, Serbian politician
- Žarko Čabarkapa, Serbian retired basketballer
- Žarko Korać, Serbian psychologist and politician
- Žarko Lazetić, Serbian retired footballer
- Žarko Petan, Slovenian writer, essayist, screenwriter, and theatre and film director
- Žarko Varajić, retired Yugoslav basketballer
- Žarko Odžakov, retired Yugoslav and Australian footballer
- Žarko Olarević
- Žarko Laušević
- Žarko Marković (footballer) (born 1987), Serbian footballer
- Žarko Marković (handballer) (born 1986), Montenegrin-Qatari handball player
- Žarko Tomašević
- Žarko Đurović
- Žarko Potočnjak
- Žarko Bulajić
- Žarko Zečević
- Žarko Nikolić
- Žarko Dolinar
- Žarko Petrović
- Žarko Zrenjanin
- Žarko Serafimovski
- Žarko Grabovač
- Žarko Domljan
- Žarko Vekić
- Žarko Puhovski
- Žarko Drašković
- Žarko Belada
- Žarko Kisić
- Žarko Korać (footballer)
- Zarko Kujundziski

== See also ==
- Žarkovac (disambiguation)
- Žarkovo
- Žarkovina
