= Stefan Bukorac =

Serbian footballer

Personal information
- Full name: Stefan Bukorac
- Date of birth: 15 February 1991 (age 35)
- Place of birth: Sremska Mitrovica, SFR Yugoslavia
- Height: 1.92 m (6 ft 3 1/2 in)
- Position: Defensive midfielder

Team information
- Current team: Kaisar
- Number: 25

Youth career
- Polet Grabovac
- Srem
- Partizan Vitojevci
- Jedinstvo Platičevo

Senior career*
Years	Team	Apps	(Gls)
2008–2015	Donji Srem	131	(3)
2015	Dinamo Tbilisi	7	(0)
2015–2016	Metalac Gornji Milanovac	15	(1)
2016	EN Paralimni	4	(1)
2016–2018	Mladost Podgorica	59	(6)
2018	Proleter Novi Sad	19	(0)
2019	Torpedo-BelAZ Zhodino	23	(2)
2020–2021	Caspiy	37	(1)
2021	→ Shakhter Karagandy (loan)	4	(0)
2022–2023	Shakhter Karagandy	47	(3)
2024	Telavi	14	(0)
2024–2026	Napredak Kruševac	61	(3)
2026–	Kaisar	11	(1)
- * Club domestic league appearances and goals as of 19:06, 3 November 2026 (UTC)

Stefan Bukorac (Serbian Cyrillic: Стефан Букорац; born 15 February 1991) is a Serbian professional footballer who plays as a midfielder for Kazakh club Kaisar.

== Club career ==
He played for Graničar from Grabovci, Srem, Partizan from Vitojevci and Jedinstvo Platičevo, before he joined Donji Srem. He was nominated for the best footballer of Srem in 2013.
