= Zarky =

Zarky is a surname. Notable people with the surname include:

- Hilbert Philip Zarky (1912–1989), American tax attorney
- Norma Zarky (1917–1977), American lawyer, wife of Hilbert

== See also ==
- Zark (disambiguation)
- Zarki
- Žarko
