= Pavlovci, Serbia =

Pavlovci Павловци (Serbian)
- Village (Selo)
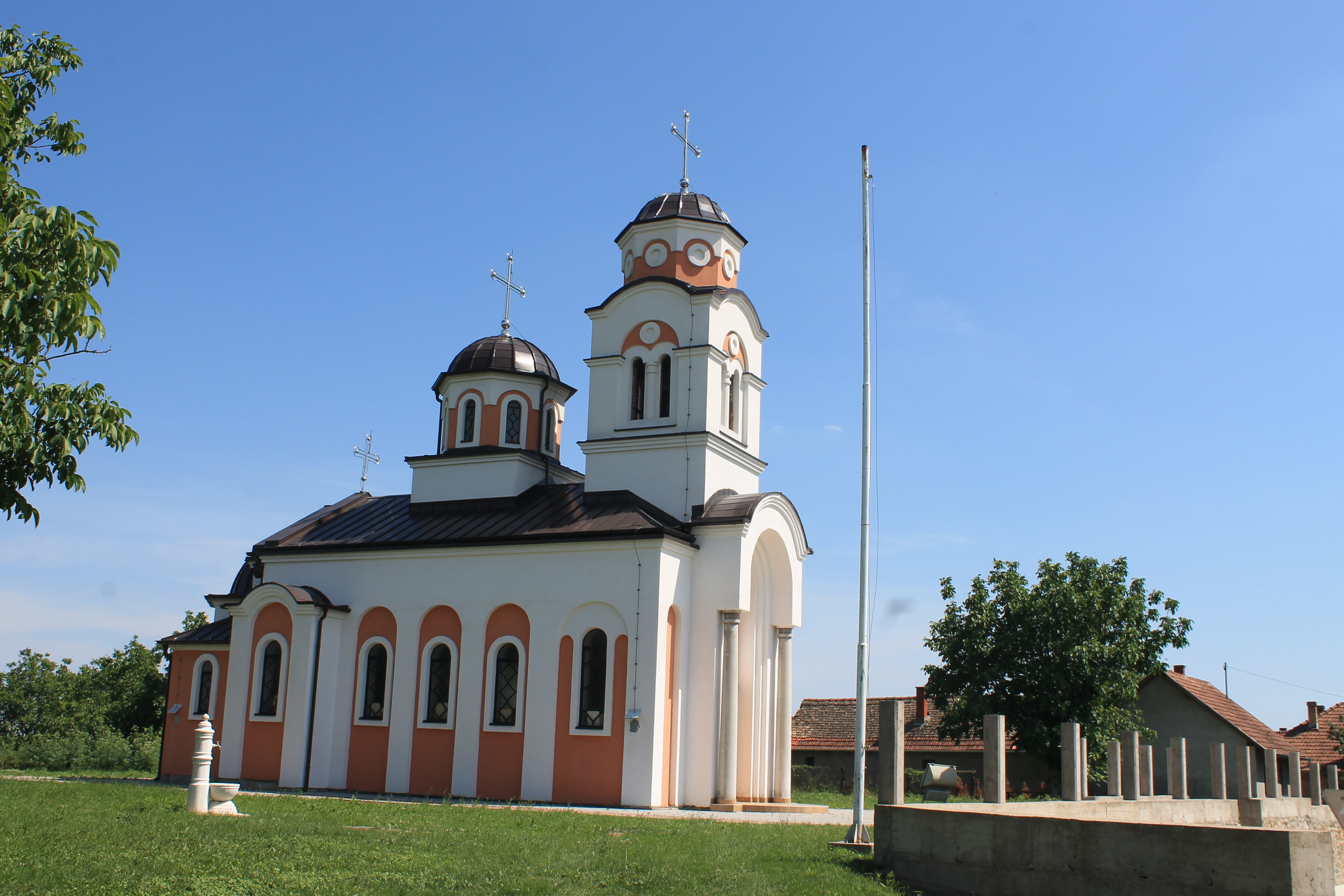

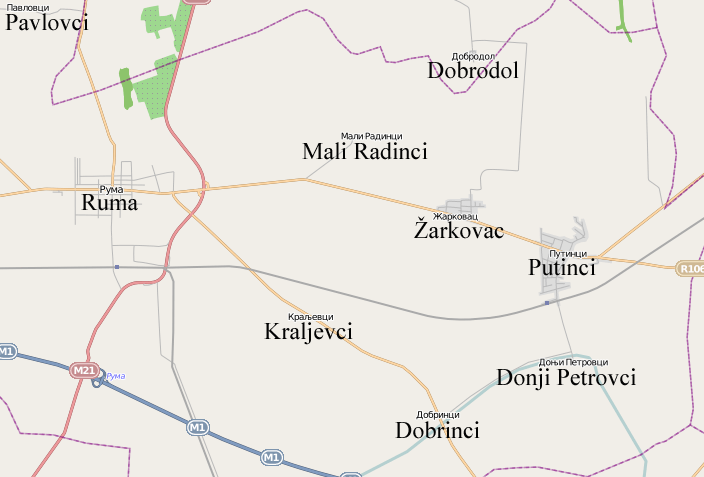

- Location within Vojvodina Location within Serbia Location within Europe
- Coordinates: 45°03′08″N 19°47′09″E
- Country: Serbia
- Province: Vojvodina
- Region: Syrmia
- District: Srem
- Municipality: Ruma

Area
  - Total: 15.15 km^{2} (5.85 sq mi)
- Elevation: 136 m (446 ft)

Population (2011)
  - Total: 393
  - Density: 25.9/km^{2} (67.2/sq mi)
- Time zone: UTC+1 (CET)
  - Summer (DST): UTC+2 (CEST)

Pavlovci (Serbian Cyrillic: Павловци) is a village located in the municipality of Ruma, Vojvodina, Serbia. As of 2011 census, it has a population of 393 inhabitants.

== Name ==
The name of the town in Serbian is plural.

== Population ==
1948	1943	1961	1971	1981	1991	2002	2011
470	487	528	493	424	404	460	393

== See also ==
- List of places in Serbia
- List of cities, towns and villages in Vojvodina
