= Bitolino =

International children theater festival Bitolino
- Dates: 5–7 August
- Frequency: Annually
- Venue: Babec Theater
- Locations: Bitola, North Macedonia
- Founded: 2011
- Area: International
- Major events: Grand Prix for best performance
- People: Vasko Mavrovski

Bitolino is an annual children theater festival held in August in organization of the Babec Theater, every year professional children theaters from all over the world participate in the festival. The main prize is the Grand Prix for best performance. The attendance for this festival has exceeded 10,000.

== Participating theaters ==
- Tiyatrotem Theater (Istanbul, Turkey) 2011,2012
- Theatre for children at Narva Gates (Saint Petersburg, Russia) 2012, 2013, 2016, 2018, 2019
- Key Theater (Tel Aviv, Israel) 2014
- Youth Theater Sarajevo (Sarajevo, Bosnia and Herzegovina) 2013
- (United Kingdom) Telling tales (West Yorkshire, England) 2012
- Anton Panov Theater (Strumica, North Macedonia) 2012
- Babec Theater (Bitola, North Macedonia) 2011
- Theater Pan (Lugano, Switzerland) 2012
- Dodona Theater (Pristina, Kosovo) 2012,2013
- David Zuazola Puppets Company (Santiago, Chile) 2013, 2022
- Artropos (Chubut, Argentina) 2013
- Mini Theater (Ljubljana, Slovenia) 2011
- Mala Scena Theater (Zagreb, Croatia) 2011, 2012, 2013, 2014, 2015
- Bereze Theater (Istanbul, Turkey) 2013
- Ariel Theater (Sofia, Bulgaria) 2013
- Puppet Theatre Shilo (Sofia, Bulgaria) 2011
- Drama and Puppet Theatre (Vratsa, Bulgaria) 2012
- Children's Cultural Centre (Belgrade, Serbia) 2014
- Tăndărică Animation Theater (Bucharest, Romania) 2014
- Shadow Theater (Marzelo, Italy) 2014
- Teater Sagohuset (Lund, Sweden) 2015
- La Bazooka (Le Havre, France)
- Ruti Tamir Mime and Puppet Theater (Modi'in-Maccabim-Re'ut, Israel)
- Theater Feurblau (Graz, Austria)
- Masque Theatere (Bethlehem, United States)
- Centre ACA Theatre (Tirana, Albania 2016
- Compagnie alleRetour (Cannes, France) 2016
- Small Delights Company (Brussels, Belgium 2016
- Mimos Marionette Theater (Yerevan, Armenia) 2016
- Marian Baćev and Arcadia Fusion Art (Sofia, Bulgaria) 2017, 2019
- Nada theater (Ruma, Serbia) 2017
- Tarla Faresi Theater (İzmir, Turkey) 2018
- El Mahrousa Group (Giza, Egypt) 2019
- Art School Jana Štursy (Nové Město na Moravě, Czech Republic) 2022
- Domovoi Theatre Company (Ticino, Switzerland) 2022
- Cemal Fatih Polat Shadow Theater (Istanbul, Turkey) 2022
- Beer Sheva Children and Youth Theater (Beersheba, Israel) 2022

== Jury members ==
- Valentina Gramosli (Actress) 2016
- Yavor Zehirov (Puppet master) 2016
- Nikola Projchevski (Actor) 2016
- Jovan Ristovski (director) 2015
- Valentina Lutts (Director/Manager of Theatre "At Narva Gates") 2015
- Sonja Mihajlovska (Actor) 2015
- Bojana Artinovska-Trpcheska (Artist) 2014
- Valdet Rama (Director/Manager of Dodona Theater) 2014
- Boris Chorevski (Actor)-2014
- Sunchica Unevska (Journalist)-2013
- Şehsuvar Aktaş (Actor) – 2013
- Jasmina Vasileva (Actor)-2013
- Nada Kokotovich (Director) – 2012
- Petar Mirchevski (Actor) – 2012
- Aneta Blazevska (Journalist) – 2012

== Grand Prix for the Best Performance ==
Grand Prix for Best Performance is the only award of the festival and is awarded to the best performance from the official competition. The award is decided by three-member international jury chosen from among world-renowned theatre artist and theoreticians. Laureates:

- 2012 – Tiyatrotem Theater (Istanbul, Turkey) for the performance We can't go on like this
- 2013 – David Zuazola Puppets Company (Santiago, Chile) for the performance Dirty Wing
- 2014 – Mala Scena Theater (Zagreb, Croatia) for the performance Funny Monster
- 2015- Ruti Tamir Mime and Puppet Theater (Modi'in-Maccabim-Re'ut, Israel) for the performance Four Fables and Queen
- 2016- Theatre for children at Narva Gates (Saint Petersburg, Russia) for the performance The Little Prince

The Grand Prix was not awarded in 2017 and 2018.
