= Church of the Transfiguration of the Lord, Ruma =

Serbian Orthodox church in Vojvodina, Serbia

Church of the Transfiguration of the Lord
- Црква вазнесења Господњег
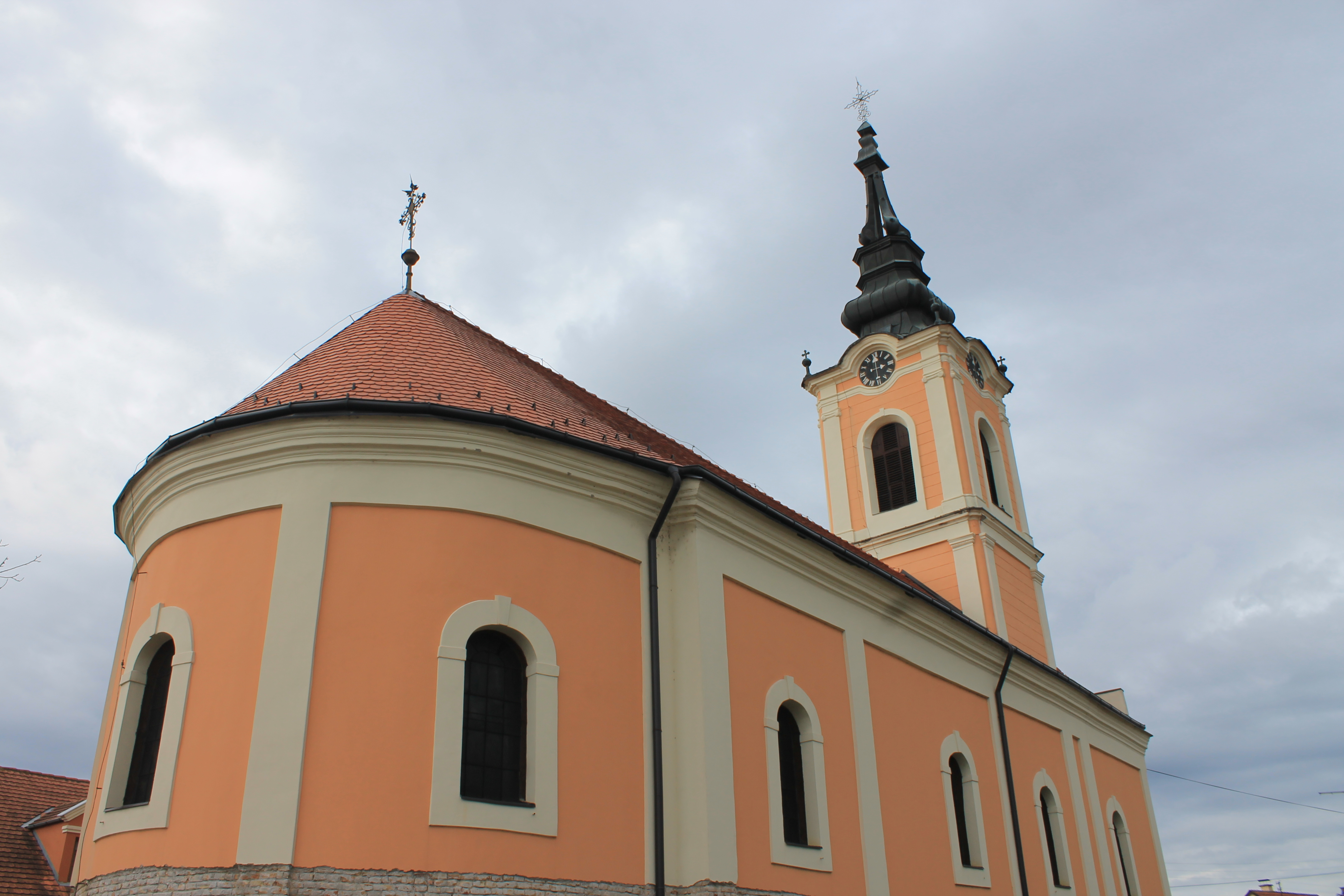
- Church of the Transfiguration of the Lord
- Church of the Transfiguration of the Lord
- 45°00′20″N 19°49′41″E
- Location: Ruma, Vojvodina
- Country: Serbia
- Denomination: Serbian Orthodox

History
- Status: Church
- Dedication: Transfiguration of the Lord

Architecture
- Functional status: Active
- Style: Neo-classicism
- Years built: 1761

Administration
- Archdiocese: Eparchy of Srem

Cultural Heritage of Serbia
- Type: Cultural Monument of Great Importance
- Designated: 1997
- Reference no.: СК 1305

The Church of the Transfiguration of the Lord (Serbian: Црква вазнесења Господњег) in Ruma is Serbian Orthodox church in Vojvodina, Serbia.

== Details ==
Based on the text from Dimitrije Ruvarac, the church was constructed in 1761. The church is a single-nave building with a semicircular apse to the east and a bell tower rising high above the western facade.

The high altar screen, decorated with Baroque and Rococo carvings, was painted by Stefan Tenecki in 1772, with his signature on the throne icons' lower right corners. His works are known for their precise drawing, skillful composition, vibrant colors, and bold treatment of drapery, identifying him as a significant figure of Ukrainian Baroque among the Serbs.

The initial location for the new church was an old, abandoned Orthodox cemetery, deemed by the district judge to be too close to the Catholic church. The dispute escalated to the extent that Empress Maria Theresa intervened, ultimately ruling in favor of constructing the second Orthodox church in Ruma. Pavle Čortanović painted the depiction of the Holy Trinity in 1843. In 1860, Konstantin Pantelić was tasked with creating the icons for the Virgin's throne. Conservation work on the building were carried out in 1969 and 1970, and in 2002.

== See also ==
- Eparchy of Srem
