= Žarko Grabovač =

Serbian footballer

Personal information
- Date of birth: 16 June 1983 (age 43)
- Place of birth: Ruma, SFR Yugoslavia
- Position: Forward

Youth career
- JVC '31
- 1996–2000: TOP Oss

Senior career*
Years	Team	Apps	(Gls)
2000–2004	TOP Oss	0	(0)
2001–2002	→ Ronse	4	
2004–2005	Geldrop/AEK		
2005	Blackpool	3	(0)
2005–2011	Fortuna Sittard	193	(17)
2011–2013	Helmond Sport	47	(6)
2013	Willem II	7	(0)
- * Club domestic league appearances and goals

Žarko Grabovač (born 16 June 1983) is a Serbian former professional footballer who played as a striker.

== Early and personal life ==
Born in Ruma, SFR Yugoslavia, Grabovač came to the Netherlands at early age and also holds Dutch citizenship.

== Career ==
Grabovač began at JVC Cuijk, before later playing as an amateur for TOP Oss, Ronse and Geldrop/AEK, before moving to England to play for Blackpool in January 2005. Grabovač made three appearances in the Football League for Blackpool, his only first-team appearances for the club, before being released at the end of the 2004–05 campaign. Grabovač returned to the Netherlands, signing with Fortuna Sittard for the 2005–06 season. In 2011, he moved to Helmond Sport

After his release by Helmond, Grabovač joined amateur side De Treffers in summer 2013, then signed for Willem II after only a few weeks. He left the Tilburg club after only 4 months as he wanted to focus on his career after football.

In October 2026, Grabovac was sentenced in Belgium to five years' imprisonment, suspended, and ordered to pay half a million euros for his involvement in large-scale cannabis production.
