= Vitojevci =

Vitojevci Витојевци (Serbian)
- Village (Selo)
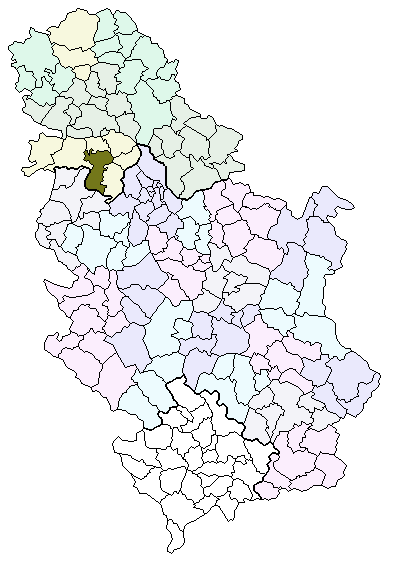
- Serbia Ruma.png

- Location within Vojvodina Location within Serbia Location within Europe
- Coordinates: 44°47′N 19°49′E
- Country: Serbia
- Province: Vojvodina
- Region: Syrmia
- District: Srem
- Municipality: Ruma

Population (2022)
  - Total: 767
- Time zone: UTC+1 (CET)
  - Summer (DST): UTC+2 (CEST)

Vitojevci (Serbian Cyrillic: Витојевци) is a village in Serbia. It is situated in the Ruma municipality, in the Srem District, Vojvodina province. The village has a Serb ethnic majority and its population numbering 767 people (2022 census).

== Name ==
The name of the town in Serbian is plural.

== See also ==
- List of places in Serbia
- List of cities, towns and villages in Vojvodina
