= Rajka Vali =

- Born: Valerija Raukar; September 5, 1924; Ruma, Kingdom of Serbs, Croats and Slovenes
- Died: March 6, 2011 (aged 86) Zagreb, Croatia
- Genres: pop Classical; Adult contemporary Easy listening Chanson
- Occupations: Singer, architect
- Years active: 1943–1960s
- Labels: Jugoton

Valerija Raukar (September 5, 1924, Ruma, Kingdom of Serbs, Croats and Slovenes – March 6, 2011, Zagreb, Croatia), most commonly known by her stage name Rajka Vali, was a Croatian pop music singer who enjoyed success through the 1940s and 1950s.

Raukar was born to an ethnic Croat family in the east Syrmian town of Ruma (today located in Vojvodina, Serbia). She began singing in the school choir in high school in Zagreb. Her professional singer career began accidentally in 1943. One of members of Trio Delinski was ill and there was an urgent need for replacement. Valerija Raukar was literally dragged by her friends into the studio of Krugovalna postaja Zagreb. She sang with Trio Delinski until the end of World War II. Afterwards she continued as a vocal soloist, sometimes making records with dance orchestras.

She studied architecture in Zagreb and graduated in 1955. She was married twice. Her first marriage was with known pre-World War II Croatian jazz musician Bojan Hohnjec, who influenced her early singing style. Her second husband was known Croatian jazz musician, drummer Marjan Moša Marjanović. In 1960 Rajka Vali moved with her husband to Germany, where she continued her singer career. She also had concerts in France, Spain and Germany. She ended her singing career due to her career as architect. In Germany she specialized medical technique and projecting, so she designed several clinics and hospitals.

In the 1980s she returned to Zagreb, Croatia, where she died in 2011.

== Discography ==
Rajka Vali recorded 26 singles for Jugoton in the period of 1951 to 1957. Only 19 of those records are saved.

Incomplete list of singles

- Ti si radost mi sva (You belong to my heart)
- Ti si biće mog sna
- Mambo, mambo, 1954
- Dal' znaš?, 1954
- Često se pitam
- Svatko za nečim čezne (To each his own)
- Srček dela tika taka – Rajka Vali i Ivo Robić
- Plavi dim, 1955
- Ti i ja
- Kad bi me volio
- Je li ljubav to (So this is love)
- San je želja (Dream is a wish)
- U iščekivanju (I'm thrilled)
- Tampico
- Baš je divan sunčan dan – Rajka Vali i Ivo Robic
- Tvoj (Yours) – Rajka Vali i Ivo Robić
- Sastanak (Danas opet)
- Kapljice kiše

In 2001 Croatia Records (ex-Jugoton) made a tribute to forgotten Croatian stars.

- Prozor u pedesete: Zaboravljene zvijezde, Forgotten Stars — trostruki luksuzni album: Zvonimir Krkljuš, Rajka Vali, Bruno Petrali pjevaju vam svoje uspjehe, Croatia Records, Perfekt Music, 2001

== Sources ==
- (in Croatian) Rajka Vali interview
- (in Croatian) Barikada – World of Music – Rajka Vali
- (in Croatian) Vijenac Nada Vrkljan-Križić: Ispravljena nepravda, December 27, 2001
