= Žarkovac (Ruma) =

Žarkovac Жарковац (Serbian)
- Village (Selo)
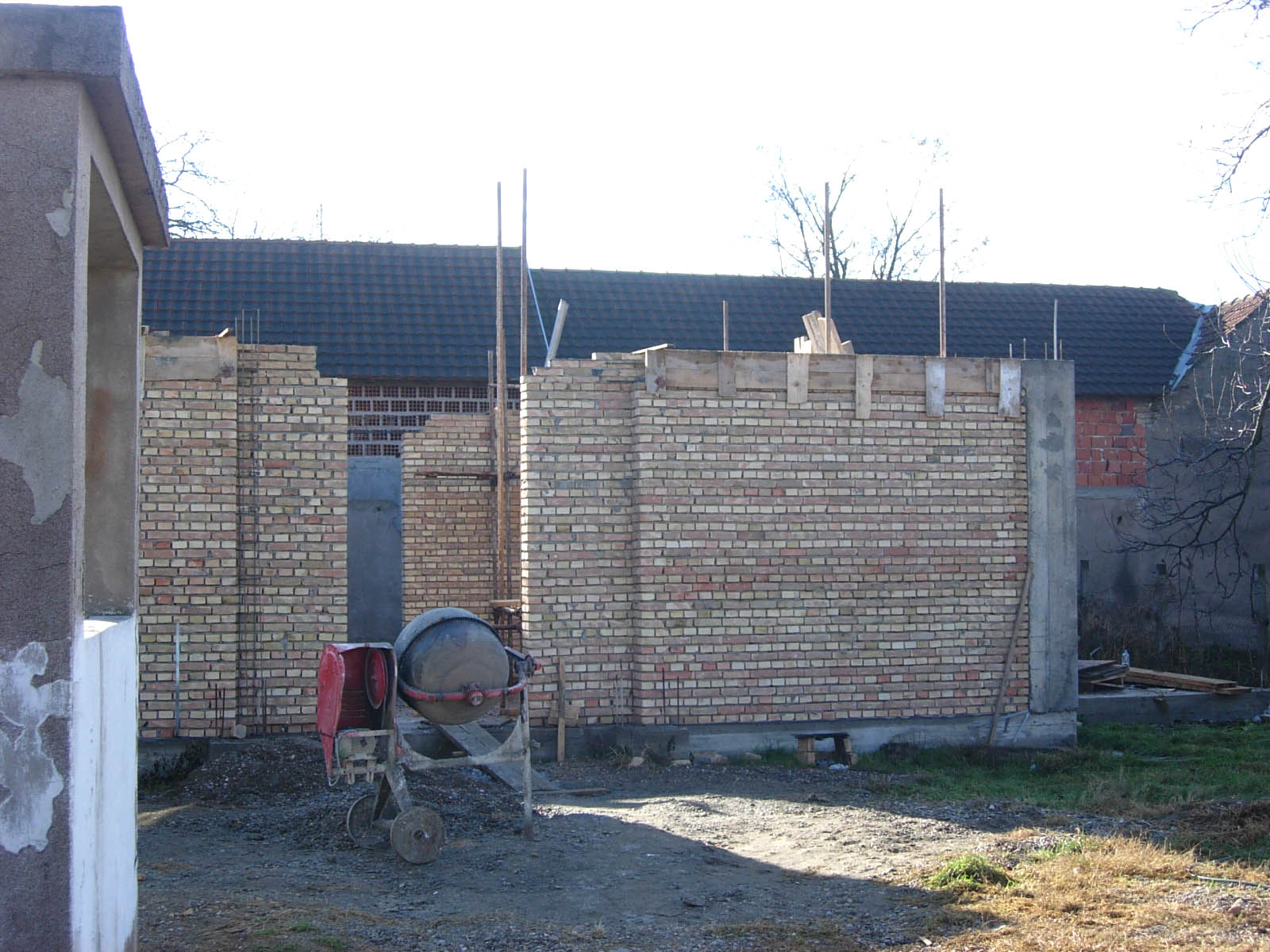
- The new Orthodox church under construction.

- Location within Vojvodina Location within Serbia Location within Europe
- Coordinates: 45°00′13″N 19°56′05″E
- Country: Serbia
- Province: Vojvodina
- Region: Syrmia
- District: Srem
- Municipality: Ruma

Population (2002)
  - Total: 1,102
- Time zone: UTC+1 (CET)
  - Summer (DST): UTC+2 (CEST)

Žarkovac (Serbian Cyrillic: Жарковац) is a village in Serbia. It is situated in the Ruma municipality, in the Srem District, Vojvodina province. The village has a Serb ethnic majority and its population numbering 1,102 people (2002 census).

== Background ==
In Serbian, the village is known as Žarkovac (Жарковац), in Hungarian as Szerémszolnok, and in Croatian as Žarkovac.

== Historical population ==
- 1961: 1,089
- 1971: 934
- 1981: 955
- 1991: 915
- 2002: 1,102

== See also ==
- List of places in Serbia
- List of cities, towns and villages in Vojvodina
