= Žarkovac =

Žarkovac can refer to:

- Žarkovac, Ruma, a village near Ruma, Serbia
- Žarkovac, Sombor, a settlement (hamlet) near Sombor, Serbia
