= Zarko Kujundziski =

Macedonian writer

Žarko Kujundžiski Жарко Кујунџиски
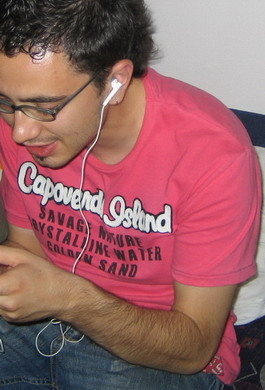
- Born: May 19, 1980 (age 46); Skopje, Republic of Macedonia
- Occupation: Writer

Žarko Kujundžiski (Zharko Kuyundziski; Macedonian: Жарко Кујунџиски) (born May 19, 1980, in Skopje, Republic of Macedonia) is a Macedonian writer and film critic. Kujundžiski has written eleven novels in addition to several collections of short stories and poems, along with essays and reviews.
