= Zark =

Zark may refer to:

- Zarquon, a character in The Hitchhiker's Guide to the Galaxy
- An imaginary planet in Bill Watterson's comic strip Calvin and Hobbes
- 7-Zark-7, a robot character in the American animated series Battle of the Planets
- Zark Rifle, a sniper rifle mod for the Unreal Tournament computer game series
- In The Paging Game, what you do with a thing is to zark it. Everybody takes turns zarking.
- Mark Zuckerberg
