= Žarko Drašković =

Montegrin football player

Personal information
- Full name: Žarko Drašković
- Date of birth: 26 September 1965 (age 61)
- Place of birth: Nikšić, SFR Yugoslavia
- Height: 1.77 m (5 ft 9 1/2 in)
- Position: Midfielder

Senior career*
Years	Team	Apps	(Gls)
1984–1986	Sutjeska		
1991–1993	Salgueiros	50	(7)
1993–1994	Beira-Mar	18	(2)
1994–1995	Sutjeska		
1995–1996	Ethnikos Piraeus	2	(0)
1996–1997	Farense	7	(0)
- * Club domestic league appearances and goals

Žarko Drašković (born 26 September 1965) is a Montenegrin football player.

Drašković began his career with FK Sutjeska Nikšić. He played for S.C. Salgueiros, S.C. Beira-Mar and S.C. Farense in the Portuguese Liga. He also had a brief spell with Ethnikos Piraeus in the Super League Greece during the 1995–96 season.
