= Ruma =

Ruma Рума (Serbian)
- Town and municipality
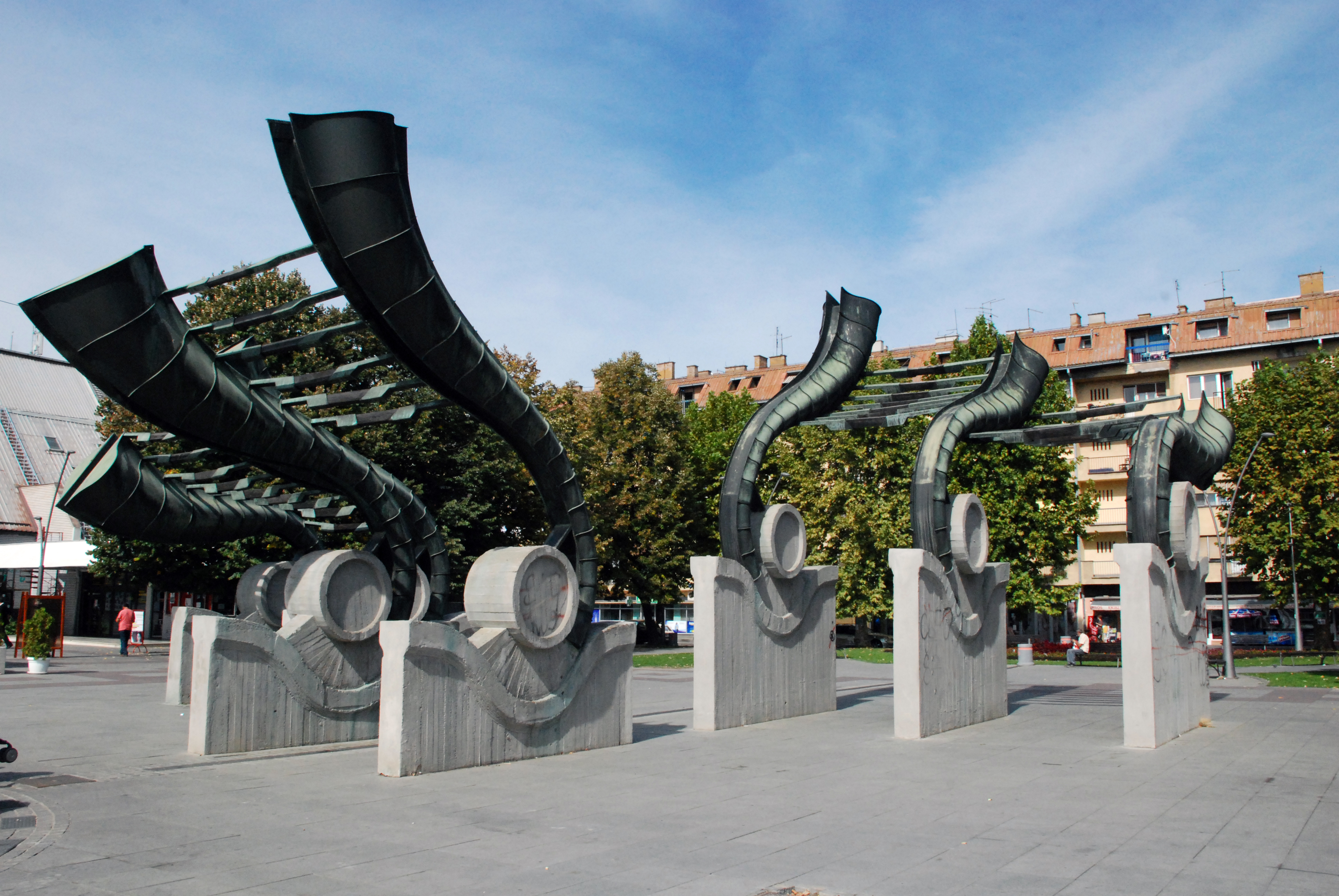
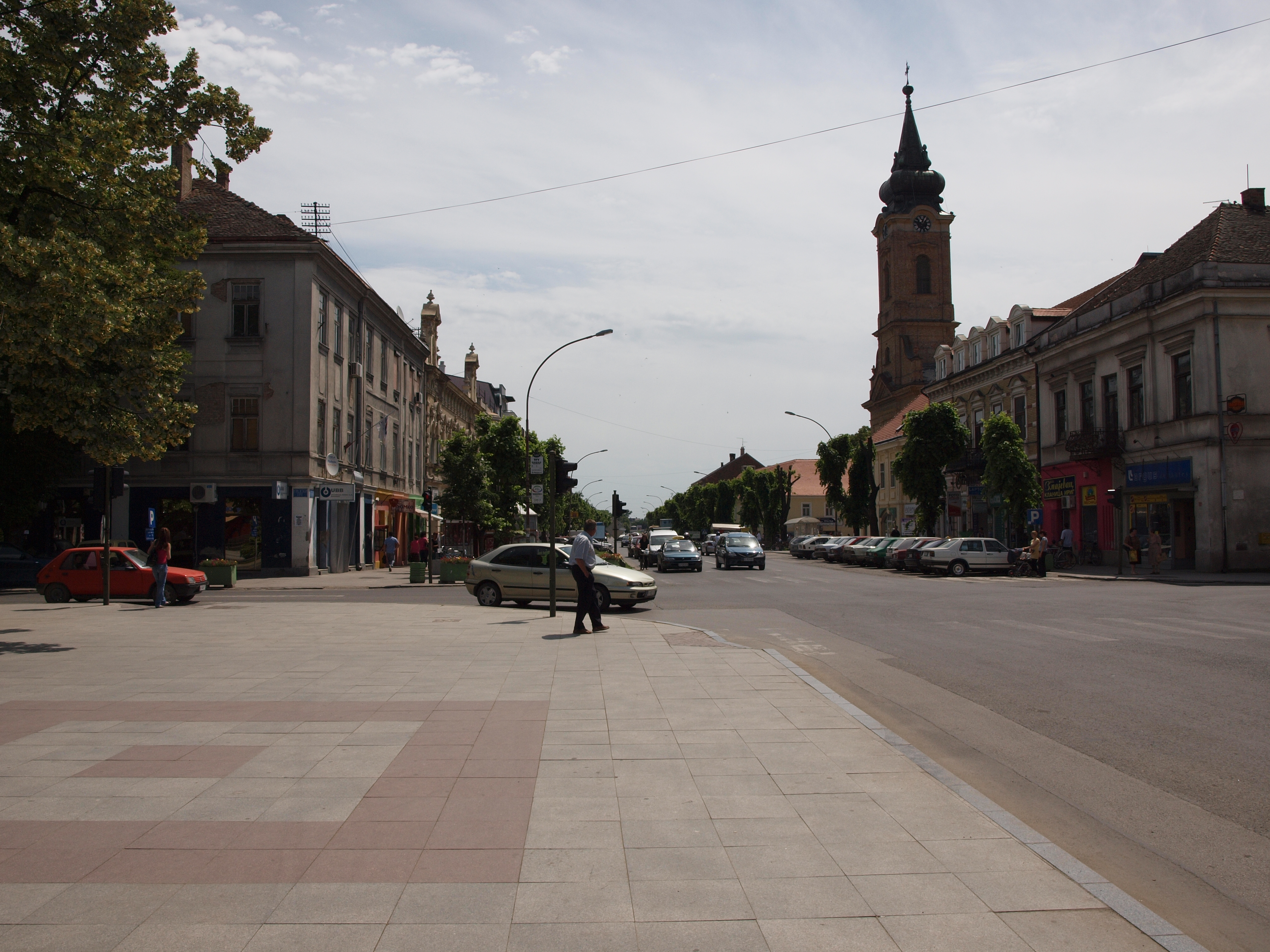
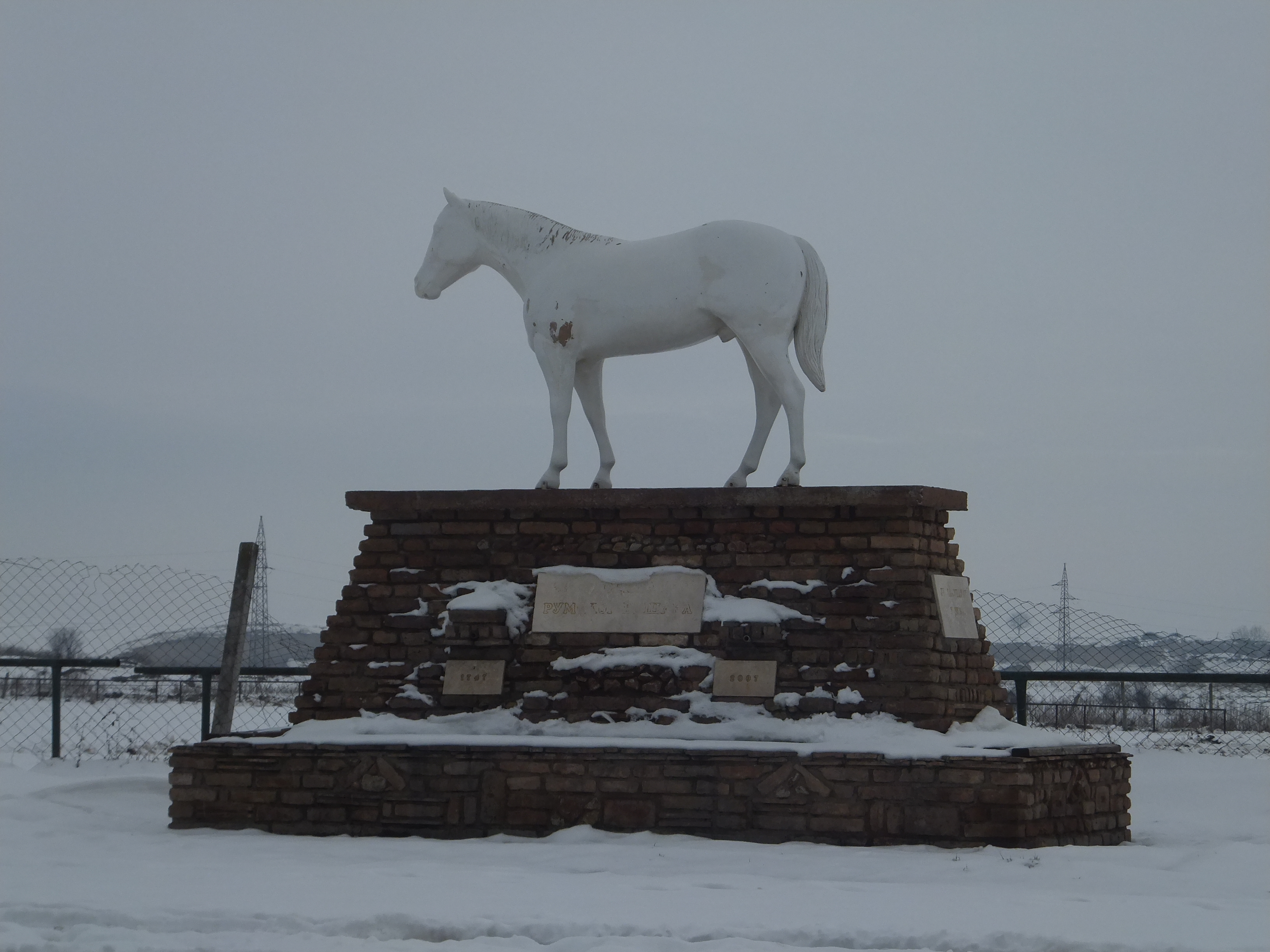
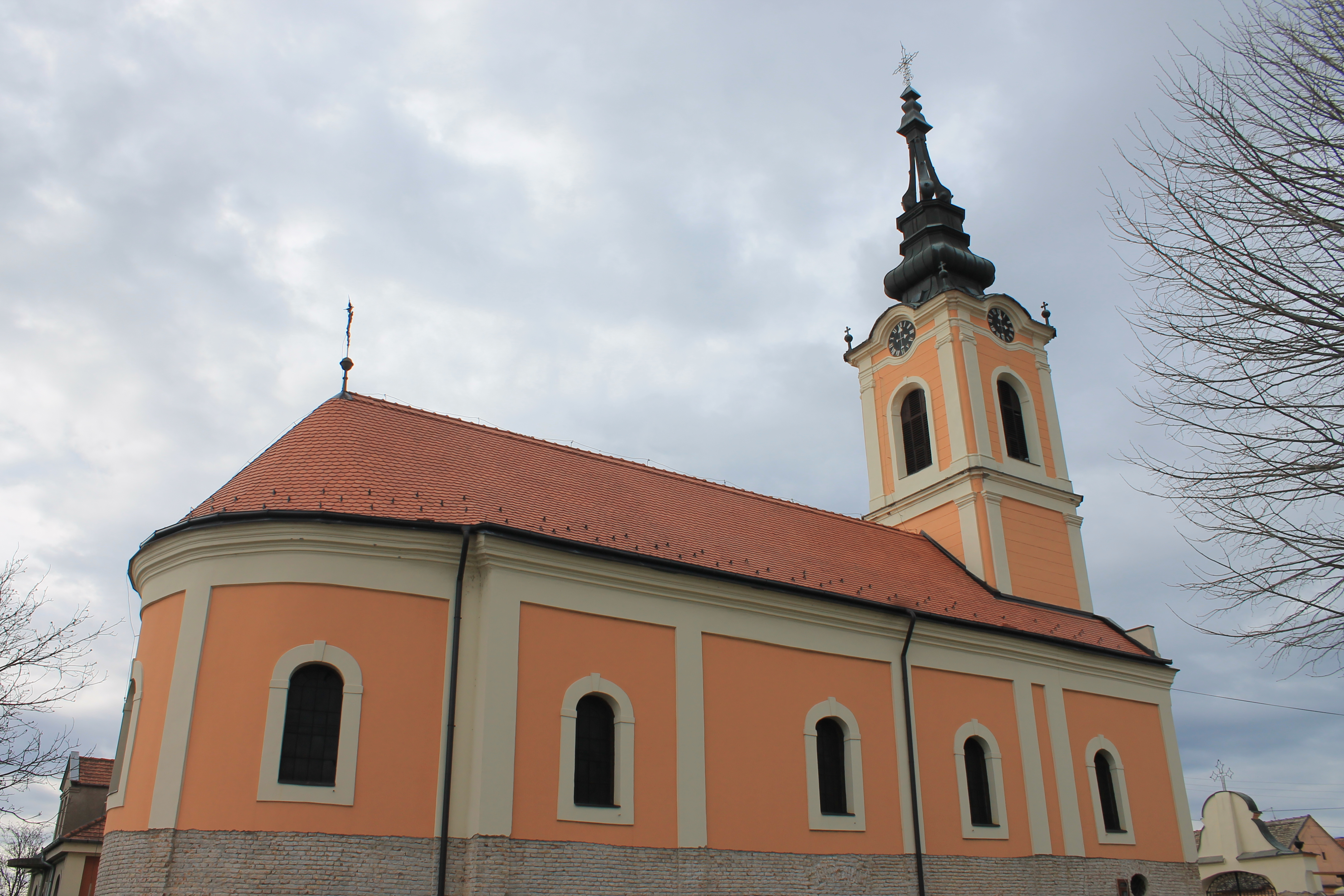
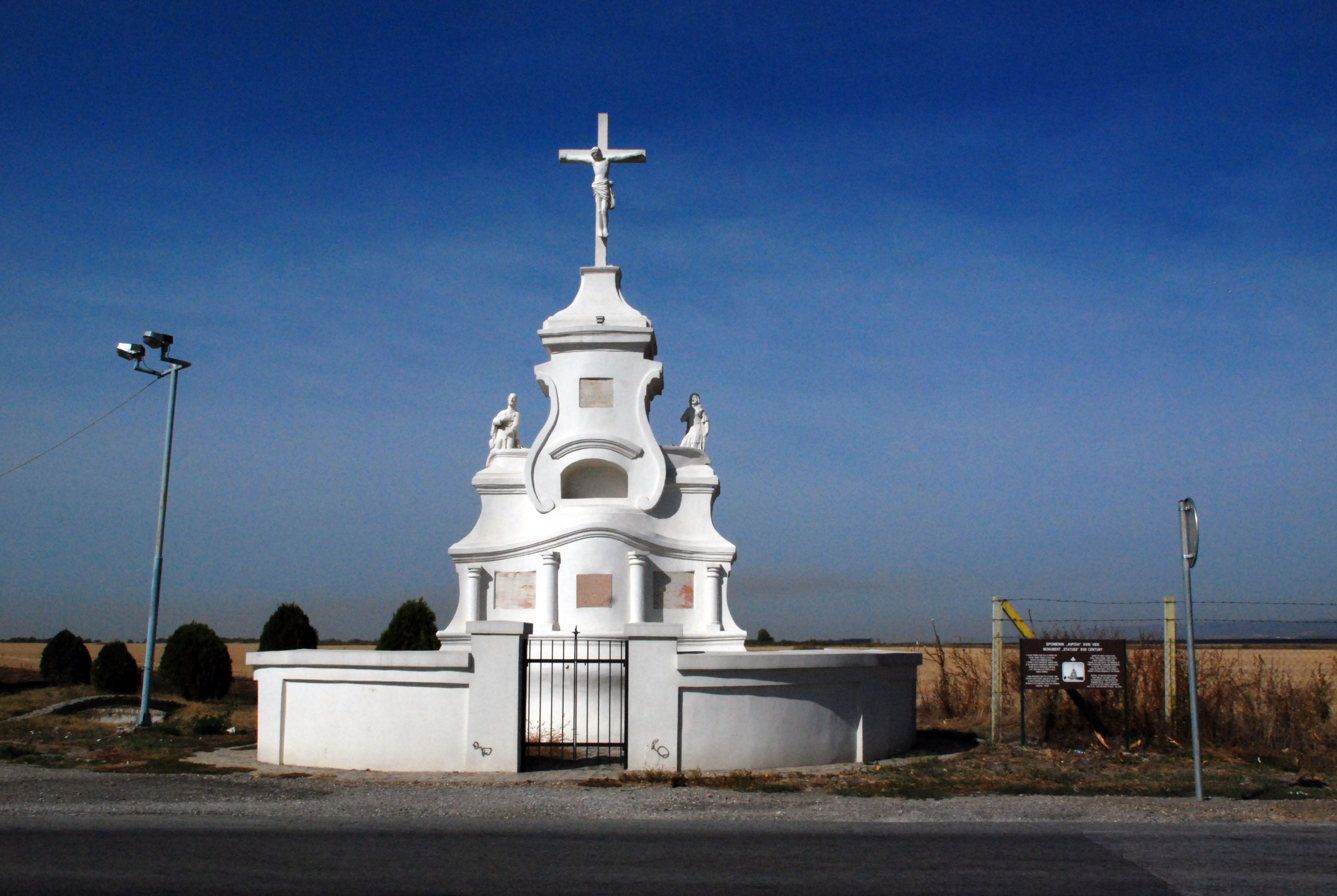
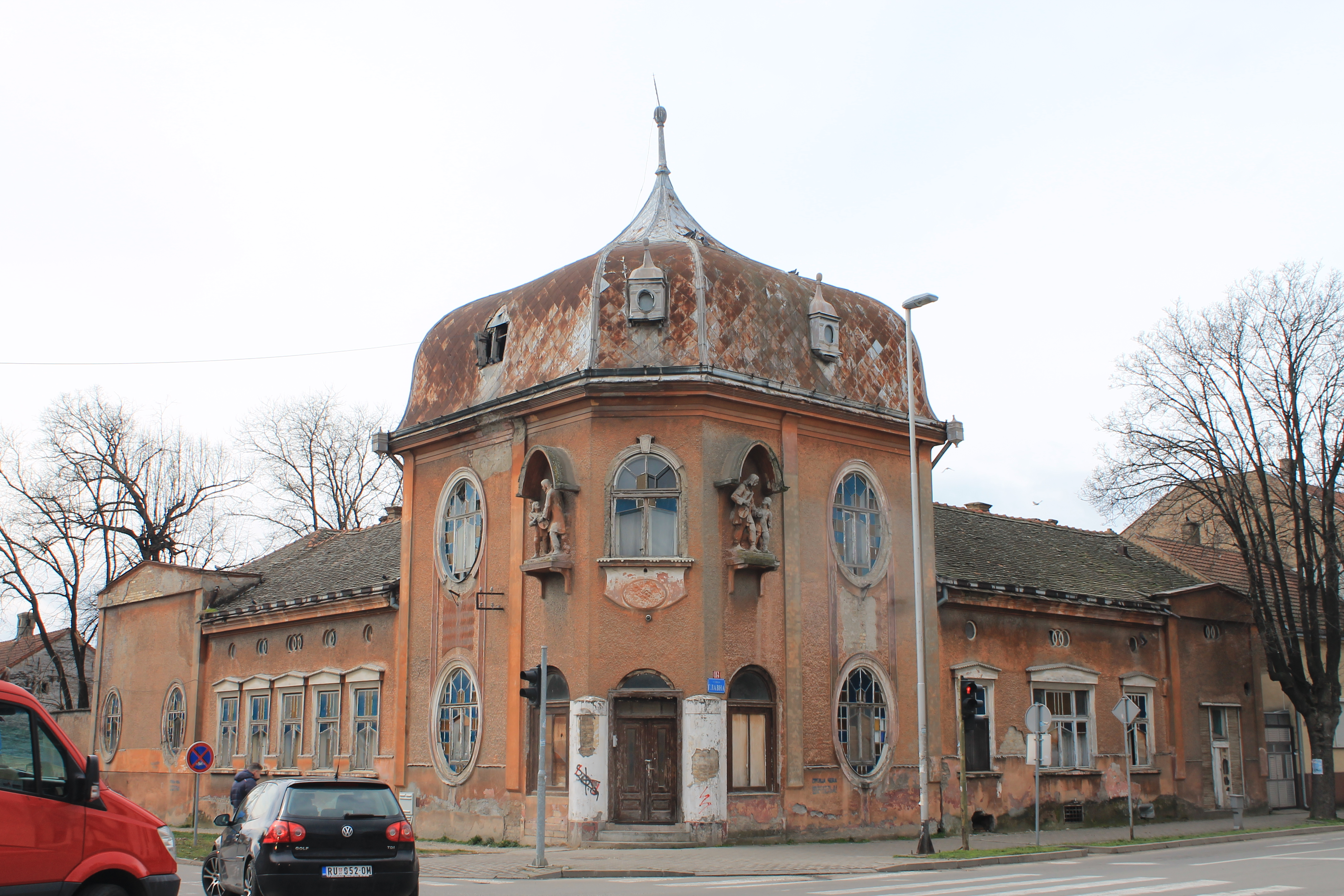
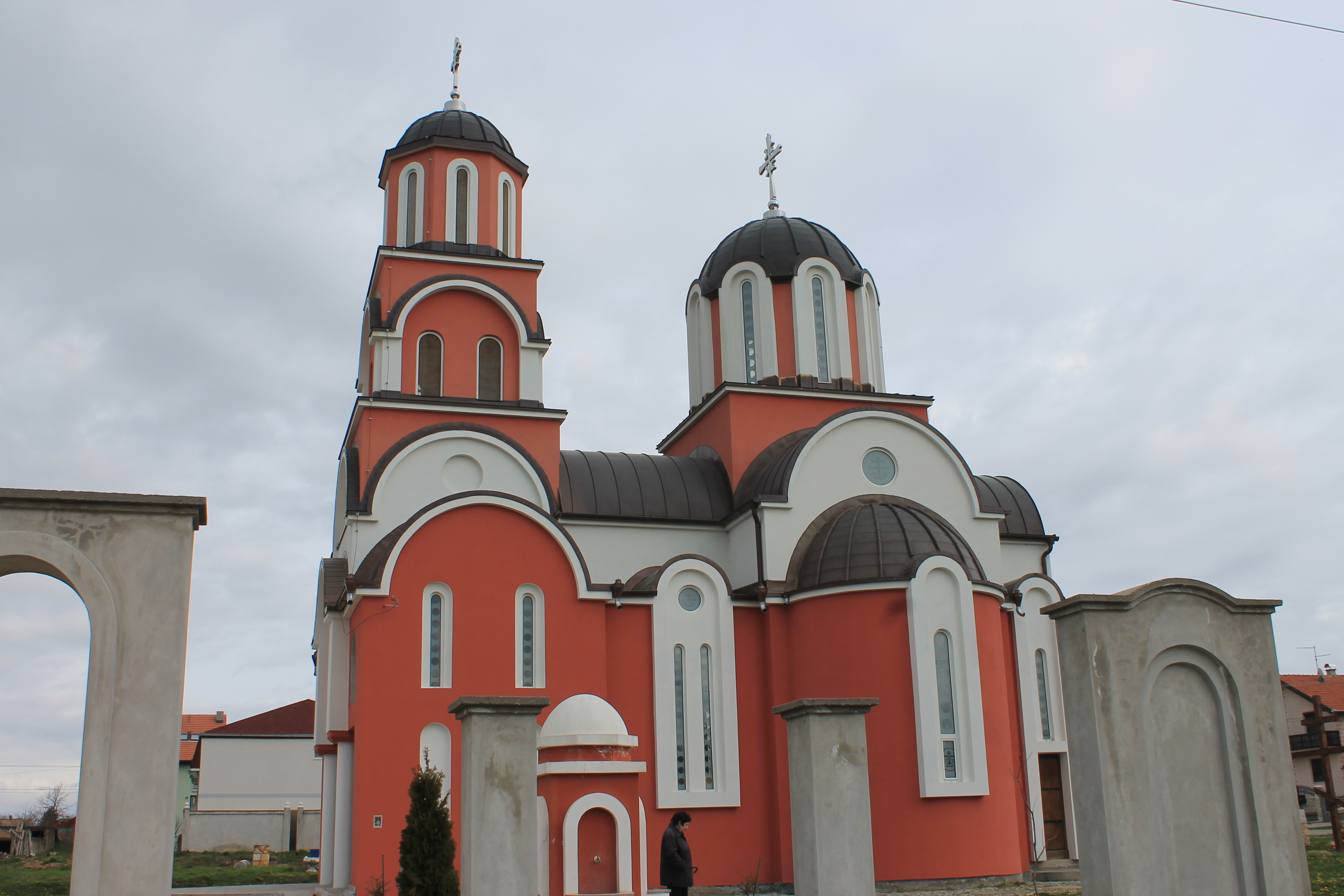
- From top: Monument of the Revolution, Downtown, Monument to a horse, Serbian Orthodox Church of the Holy Ascension of the Lord, One of the two statues of the monument to the plague, Town library, New Orthodox Church

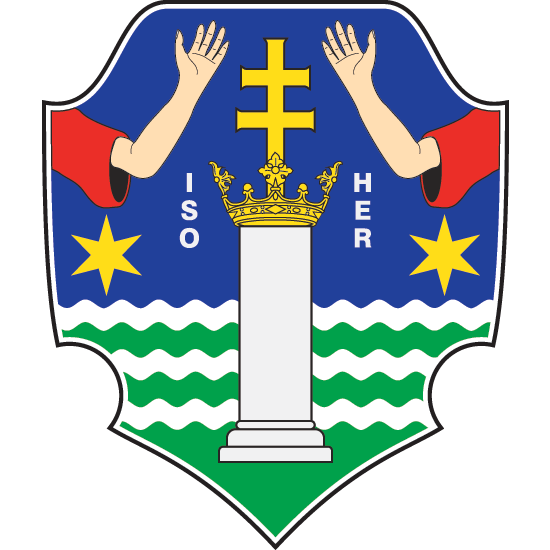
- Coat of arms

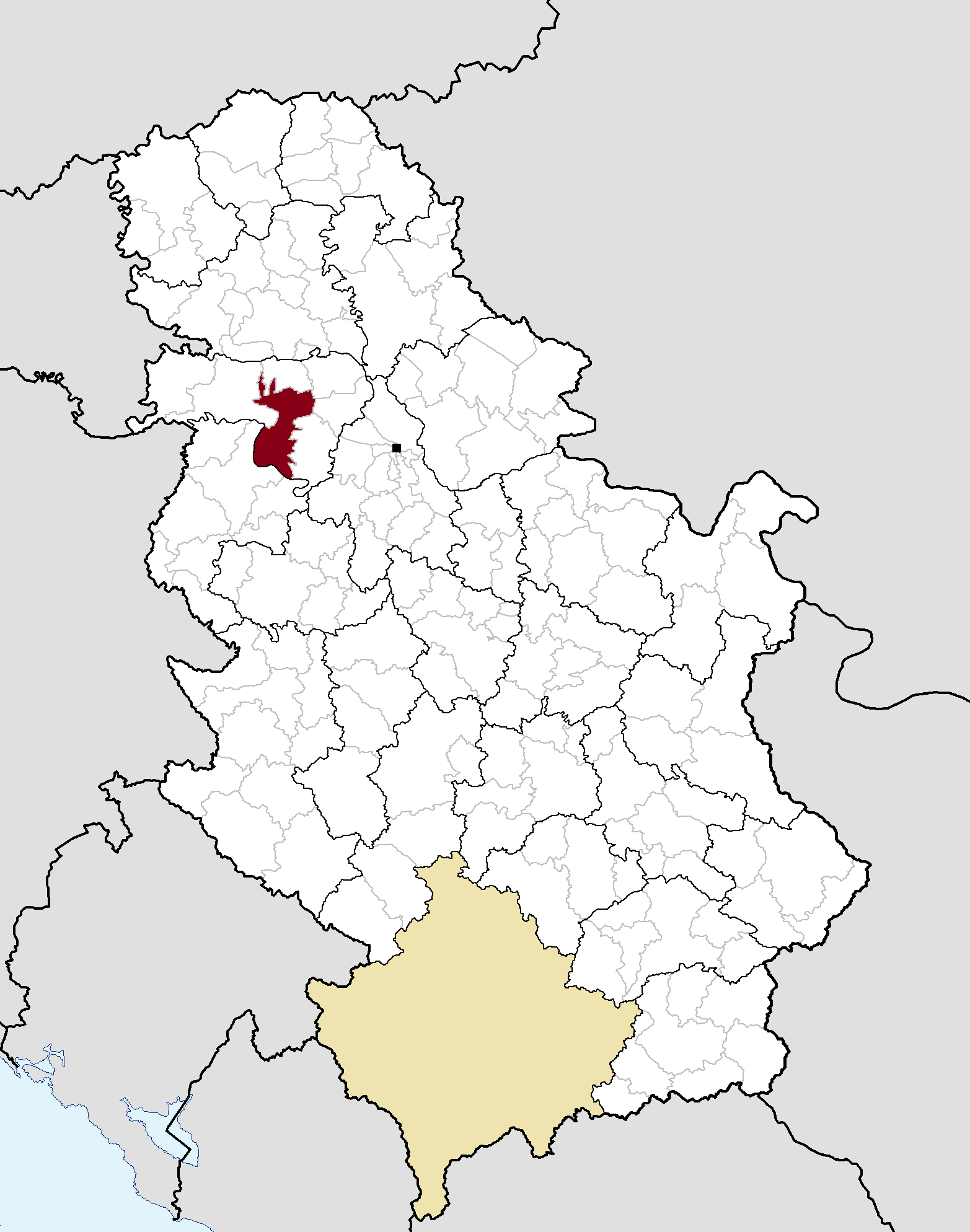
- Location of the municipality of Ruma within Serbia
- Interactive map of Ruma
- Coordinates: 45°00′N 19°50′E
- Country: Serbia
- Province: Vojvodina
- Region: Syrmia
- District: Srem
- Municipality: Ruma
- Settlements: 17

Government
  - Mayor: Dušan Ljubišić (SNS)

Area
  - Town: 68.66 km^{2} (26.51 sq mi)
  - Municipality: 582.02 km^{2} (224.72 sq mi)
- Elevation: 112 m (367 ft)

Population (2022 census)
  - Town: 27,747
  - Town density: 404.1/km^{2} (1,047/sq mi)
  - Municipality: 48,621
  - Municipality density: 83.538/km^{2} (216.36/sq mi)
- Time zone: UTC+1 (CET)
  - Summer (DST): UTC+2 (CEST)
- Postal code: 22400
- Area code: +381(0)22
- Car plates: RU
- Official languages: Serbian
- Website: www.ruma.rs

Ruma (Serbian Cyrillic: Рума; Hungarian: Árpatarló) is a town and municipality in the Srem District of the Autonomous Province of Vojvodina, Serbia. As of 2022, the town has a population of 27,747, while the municipality has a population of 48,621.

== History ==
Traces of organized human life on the territory of Ruma municipality date back as far as prehistory. The most important archaeological locality in the municipality is Bronze Age Gomolava near Hrtkovci, with two exclusive tombs of Bosut culture dating to the 9th century BC and 3000BC Vučedol culture pottery. The first known inhabitants of this area were various peoples of Illyrian and Celtic origin, such as the Amantini, Breuci, Scordisci, etc. During the Roman rule, local inhabitants lost their ethnic character and adopted Roman culture. There were no larger Roman settlements on the territory of Ruma, but a certain number of agricultural estates known as "villae rusticae" were located there.

Migrations of Huns, Germanic peoples, Avars and Slavs destroyed Roman culture in this area. During the following centuries, the region was ruled by Frankish Empire, Bulgarian Empire, Byzantine Empire and Kingdom of Hungary.

The settlement named Ruma was first mentioned in an Ottoman defter from 1566/7. In that period Ruma was a village inhabited by Serbs, with 49 houses, a church and three priests.

From 1718, Ruma was under administration of the Habsburg monarchy. In 1746, the town of Ruma was founded near the original village of Ruma. The first inhabitants of the town were Serbs, who came from neighboring settlements, as well as Germans, who came from Germany. In the beginning of the 19th century, Croats and Hungarians settled there as well. In 1807, a large rebellion of the Syrmian peasants known as the Tican's Rebellion started on the territory of Ruma, with its center in the village of Voganj. During the 1848–1849 revolution, Ruma was one of the important centers of the Serbian national movement in Syrmia.

In the late 19th and early 20th century, Ruma was a district capital in the Syrmia County of the Kingdom of Slavonia who later was annexed by Kingdom of Croatia-Slavonia region in Austria-Hungary. According to the 1910 census, the population of the Ruma municipality was 49,138 inhabitants, of whom 22,956 spoke Serbian, 15,529 German, 5,746 Hungarian, and 3,730 Croatian.

=== World War I ===
After the collapse of the Austro-Hungarian monarchy, on November 24, 1918, the Assembly of Syrmia in Ruma proclaimed the unification of Syrmia with the Kingdom of Serbia. In 1933, Ruma officially gained the status of a city.

=== World War II ===
When World War II began, Ruma was one of the centers of German national minority in Vojvodina. In 1942, during the Axis occupation of Syrmia, a unit of the Third Reich's Wehrmacht, known as the Volunteer Company Ruma ES der DM, was formed from local Volksdeutsche volunteers. A large number of non-German citizens of Ruma participated in the anti-fascist struggle against Axis occupation. In 1944, as a consequence of the war, most members of the German ethnic minority left the town, escaping from Yugoslav partisans and Soviet Red Army. Around 1,000 of them remained when the partisans took the town. Many of them were shot in November 1944, while survivors were taken to the Svilara concentration camp in Sremska Mitrovica.

In 1949 the Union of Pilots of Yugoslavia (Vazduhoplovni Savez Jugoslavije) opened a pilot school, a school for parachute instructors and a school of aircraft modelling in Ruma, all of which were funded by the Airforces of Yugoslavia. This led to an impressive International air show held in the center of the town in 1950.

=== 1990s ===
During the 1990s, about 10,000 refugees from Croatia, Bosnia and Kosovo settled in Ruma as well. After the war, colonists from various parts of the former Yugoslavia settled this area.

== Inhabited places ==
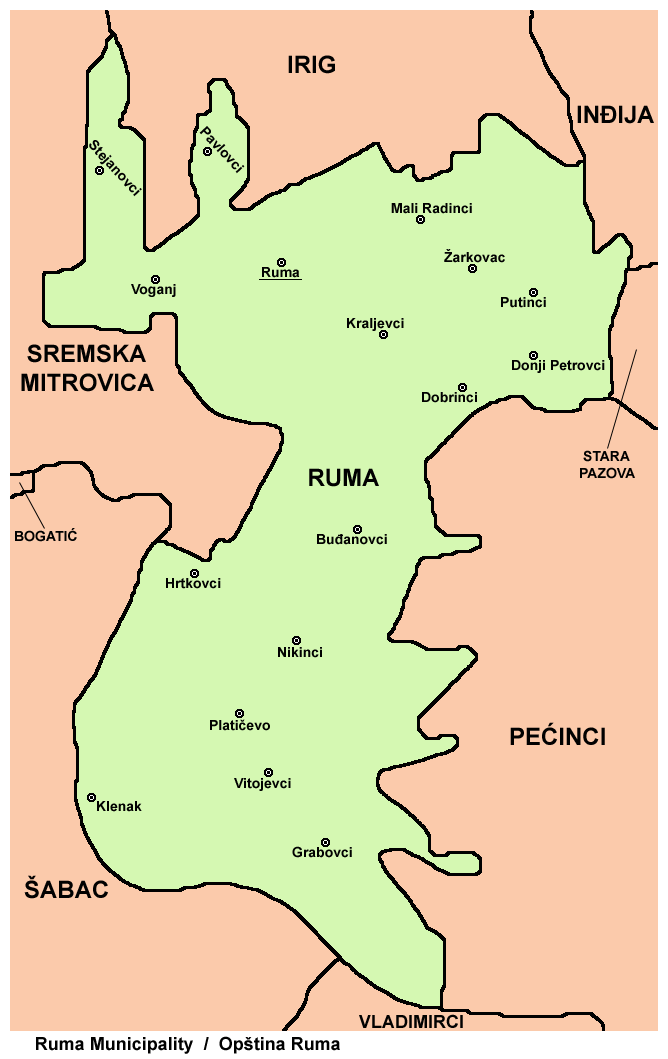
Map of Ruma municipality

The Ruma municipality comprises the town of Ruma and the following villages:

- Buđanovci
- Vitojevci
- Voganj
- Grabovci
- Dobrinci
- Donji Petrovci
- Žarkovac
- Klenak
- Kraljevci
- Mali Radinci
- Nikinci
- Pavlovci
- Platičevo
- Putinci
- Stejanovci
- Hrtkovci

== Demographics ==
Historical population
Year	Pop.	±% p.a.
1948	37,622	—
1953	40,742	+1.61%
1961	47,671	+1.98%
1971	52,156	+0.90%
1981	55,083	+0.55%
1991	55,087	+0.00%
2002	60,006	+0.78%
2011	54,339	−1.10%
2022	48,621	−1.01%

View northwesterly of Ruma vicinity

According to the 2011 census results, the municipality of Ruma had 54,339 inhabitants.

=== Ethnic groups ===
The municipality of Ruma has many ethnic groups, with Serbs constituting a majority in all settlements. The ethnic composition of the municipality of Ruma:

Ethnic group	Population	%
Serbs	46,891	86.29%
Croats	1,719	3.16%
Romani	1,297	2.39%
Hungarians	1,171	2.15%
Yugoslavs	267	0.49%
Macedonians	153	0.28%
Albanians	57	0.10%
Montenegrins	54	0.10%
Slovaks	50	0.09%
Germans	49	0.09%
Muslims	39	0.07%
Others	2,592	4.77%
Total	54,339	

== Economy ==
The following table gives a preview of total number of registered people employed in legal entities per their core activity (as of 2018):

Activity	Total
Agriculture, forestry and fishing	427
Mining and quarrying	8
Manufacturing	6,762
Electricity, gas, steam and air conditioning supply	217
Water supply; sewerage, waste management and remediation activities	215
Construction	579
Wholesale and retail trade, repair of motor vehicles and motorcycles	1,999
Transportation and storage	809
Accommodation and food services	338
Information and communication	111
Financial and insurance activities	136
Real estate activities	4
Professional, scientific and technical activities	333
Administrative and support service activities	149
Public administration and defense; compulsory social security	550
Education	713
Human health and social work activities	748
Arts, entertainment and recreation	161
Other service activities	200
Individual agricultural workers	635
Total	15,094

== Sports ==
Local football club Sloven has competed in the second tier of Serbian football.

== Notable citizens ==
- Aleksandar Berček, actor
- Miloš Bosančić, Serbian footballer
- Brana Crnčević, writer
- Stanija Dobrojević, glamour model and TV personality
- Teodor Filipović (Boža Grujović), first secretary of "Praviteljstvujušči sovjet" in Karađorđe's Serbia
- Stjepko Gut, jazz musician
- Paško Rakić, neuroscientist
- Atanasije Stojković, scientist and writer
- Dragan Šarac, former Serbian footballer
- Alois Weiss, executioner
- Rajka Vali, singer
- Danilo Pantić, Serbian football player
- Vjekoslav Servatzy, Croatian Ustaše military officer, war criminal

== Sister cities ==
- Arzamas, Russia
- Bersenbrück, Germany

== Image gallery ==
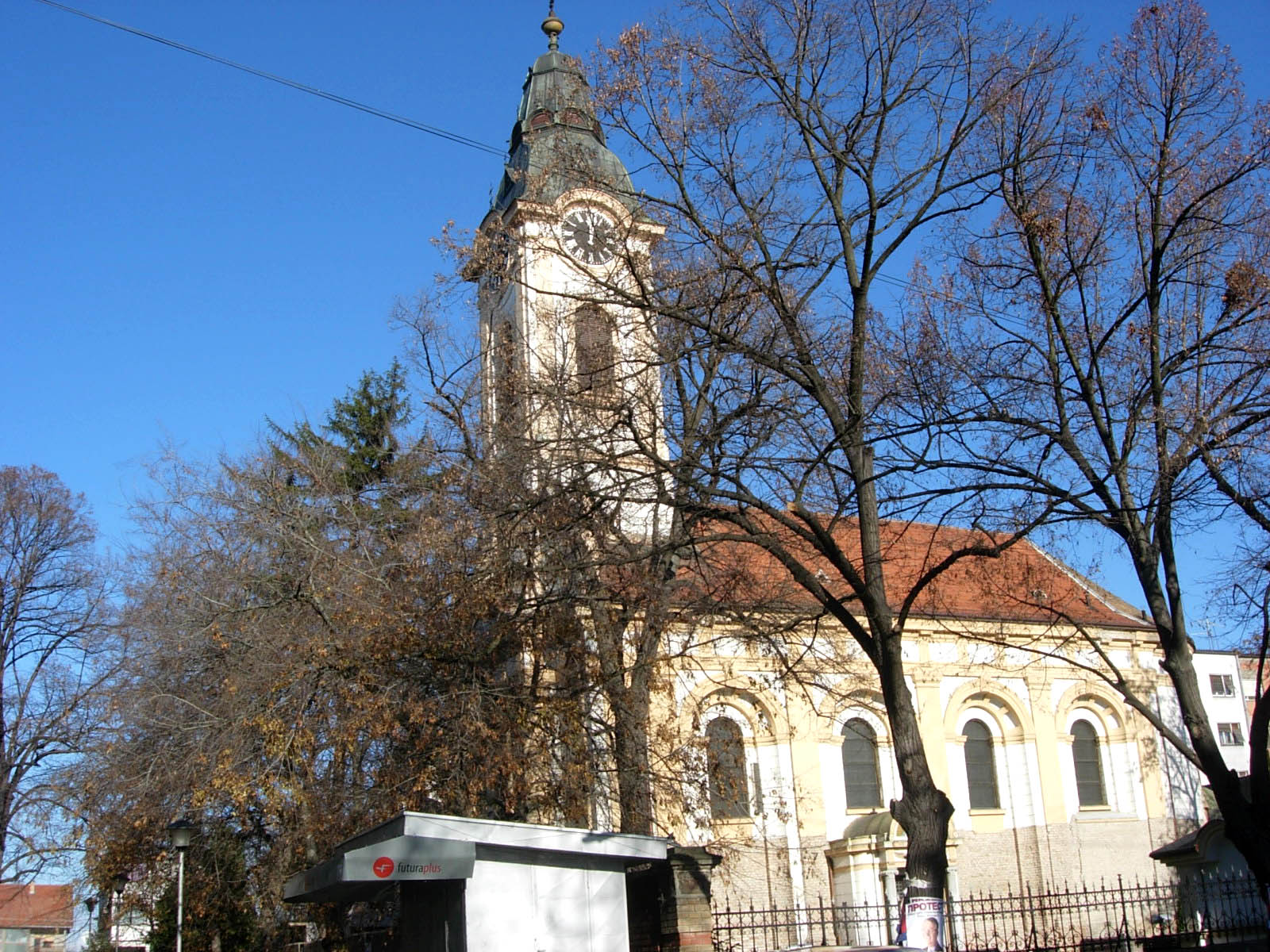
The Orthodox church

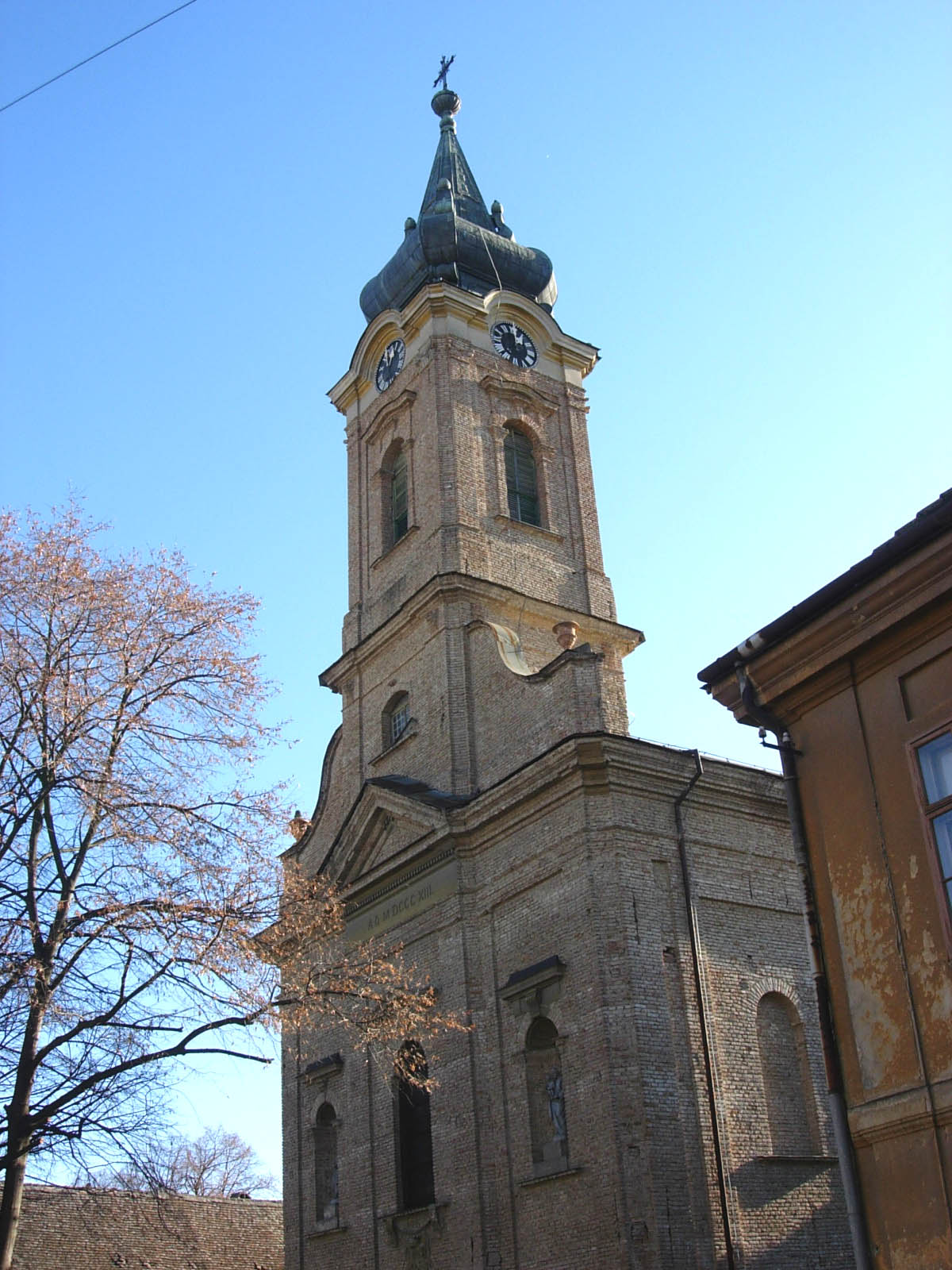
The Catholic church

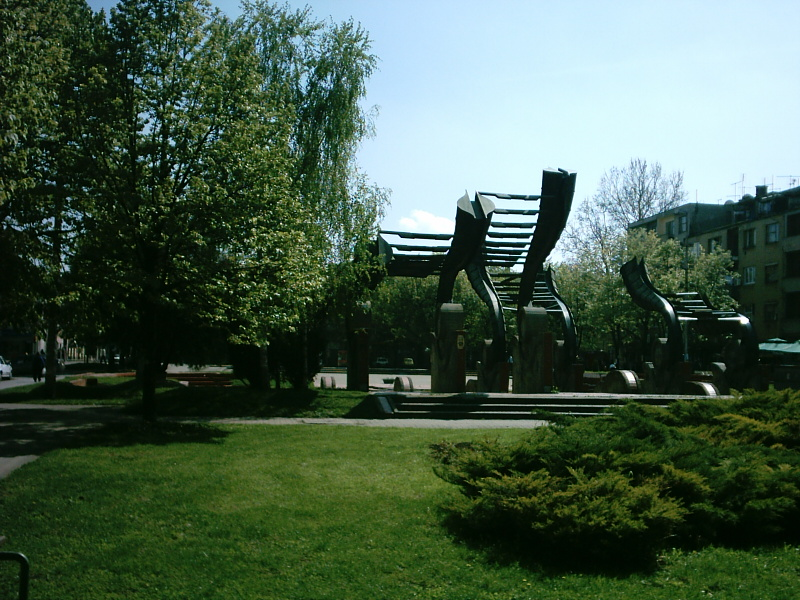
Monument in the center of the city

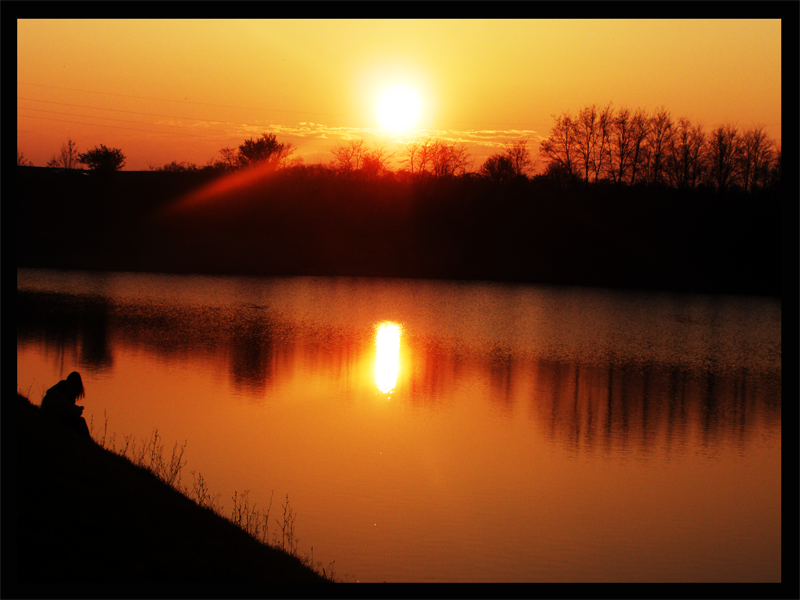
Borkovac Lake

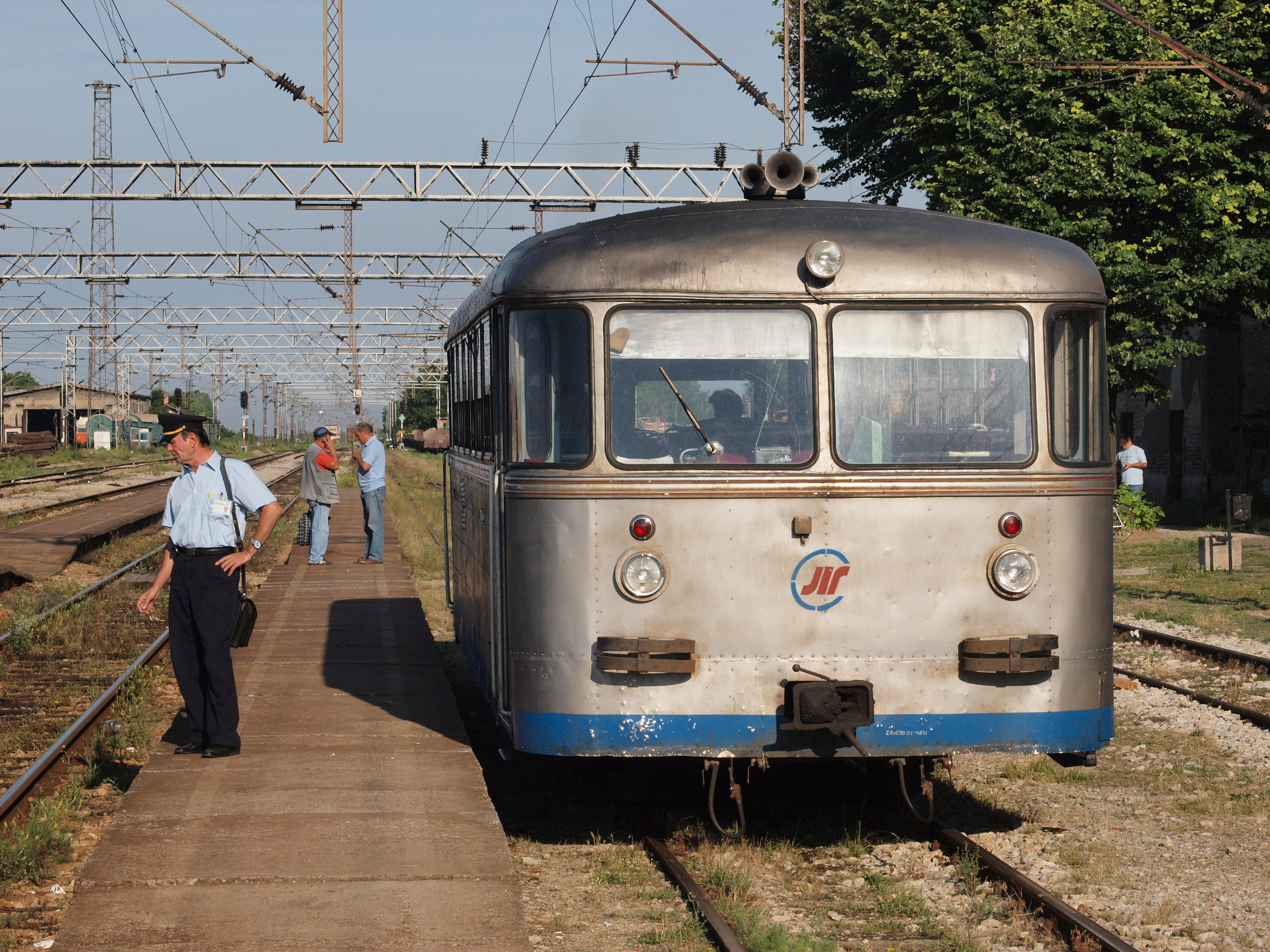
A junction train from Ruma to Šabac

== See also ==
- List of cities in Serbia
- List of cities, towns and villages in Vojvodina
- Syrmia
- Syrmia District
