= Srem District =

Administrative district of Serbia

Srem District Сремски округ
- Administrative district of Serbia
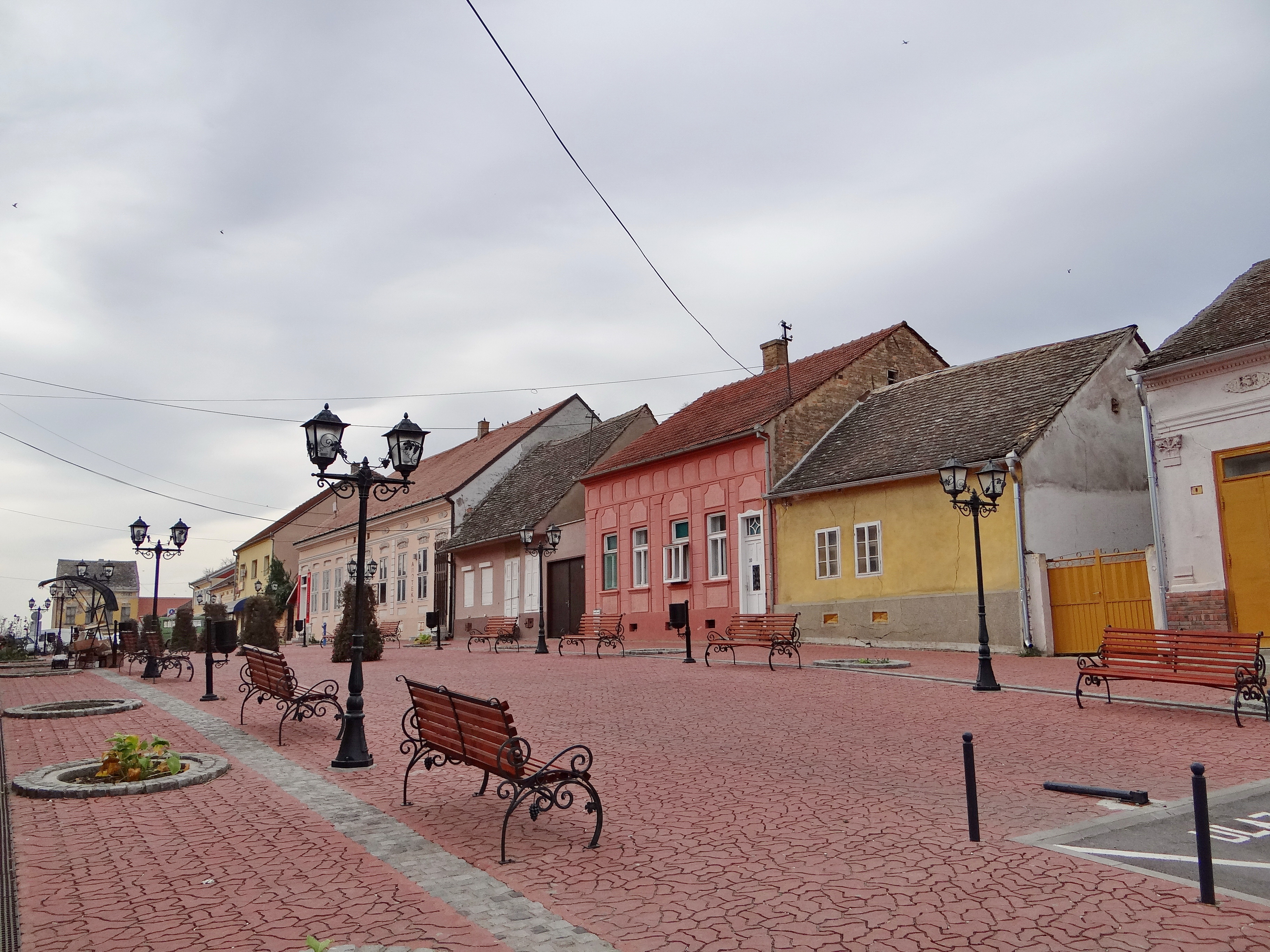
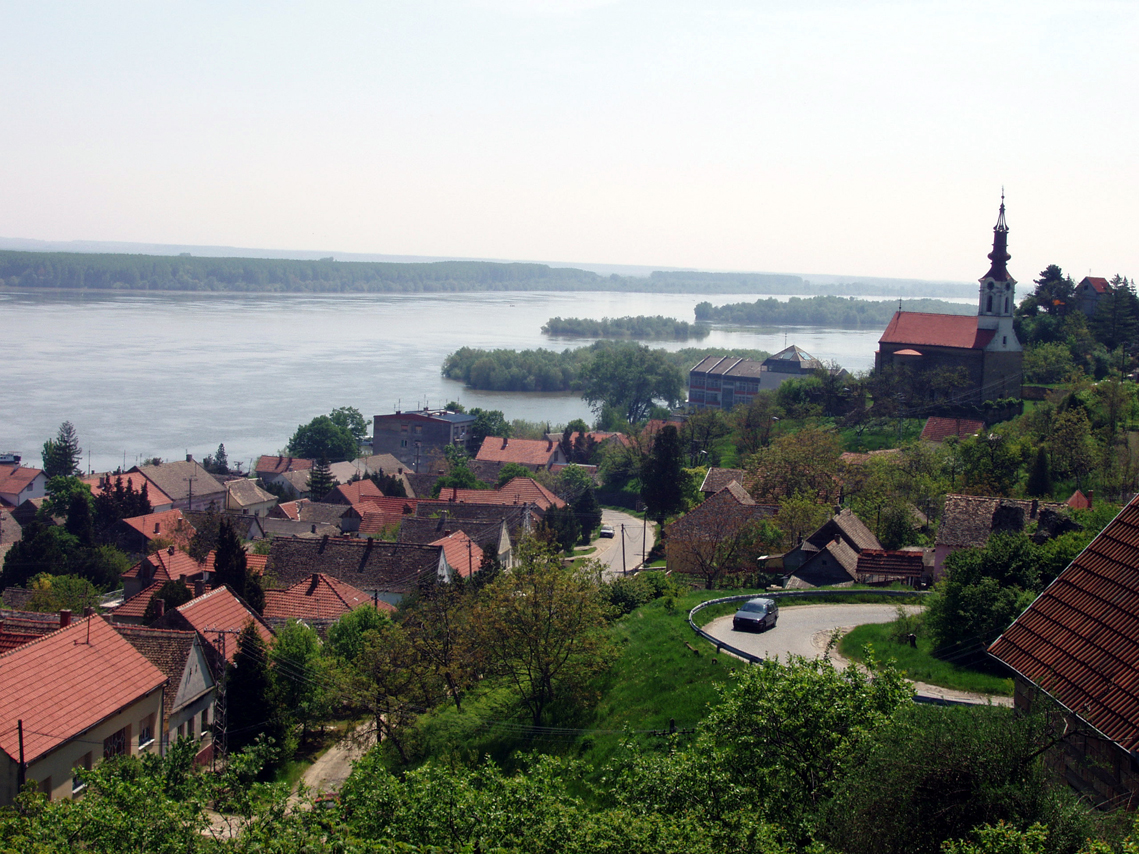
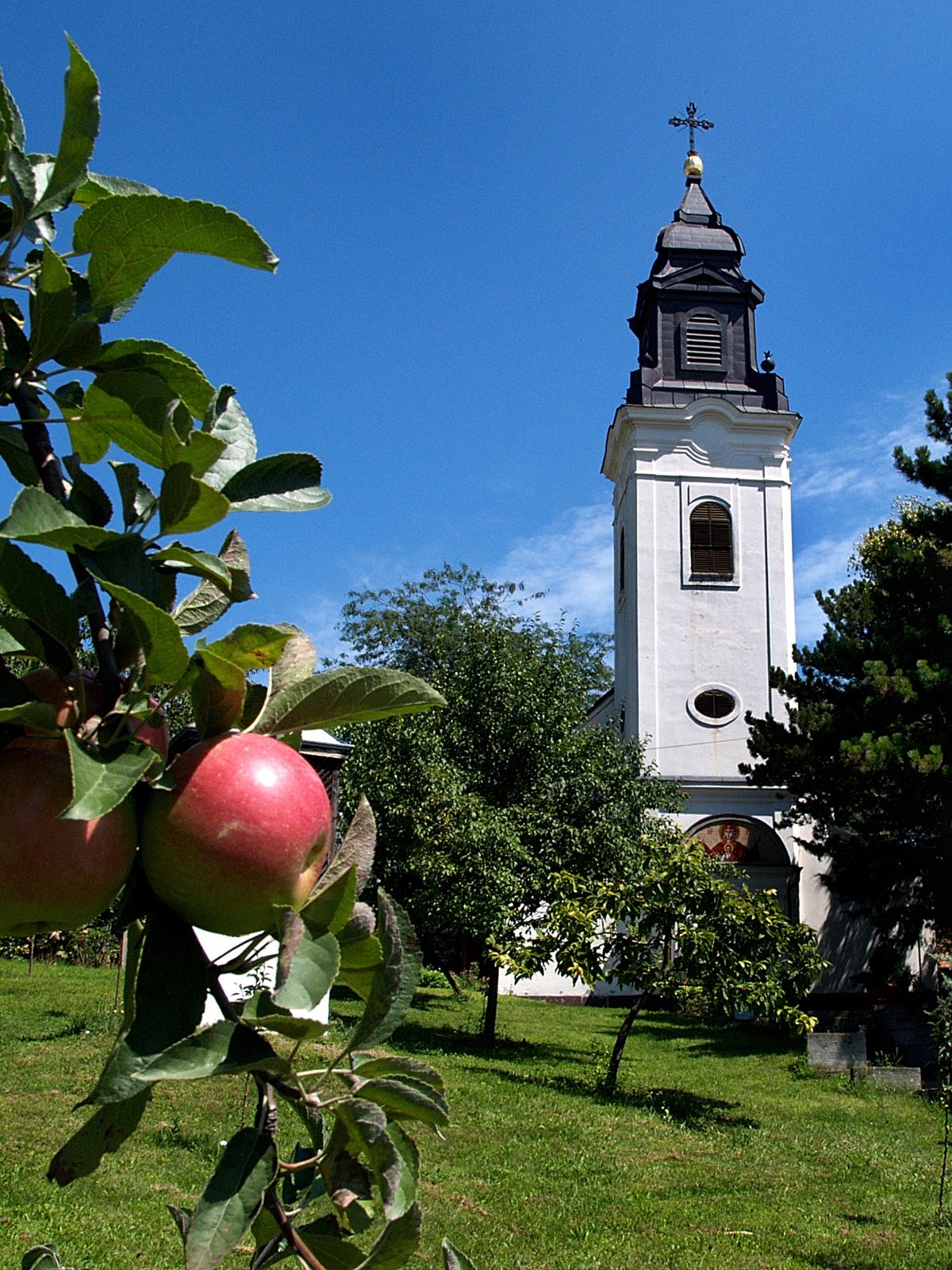
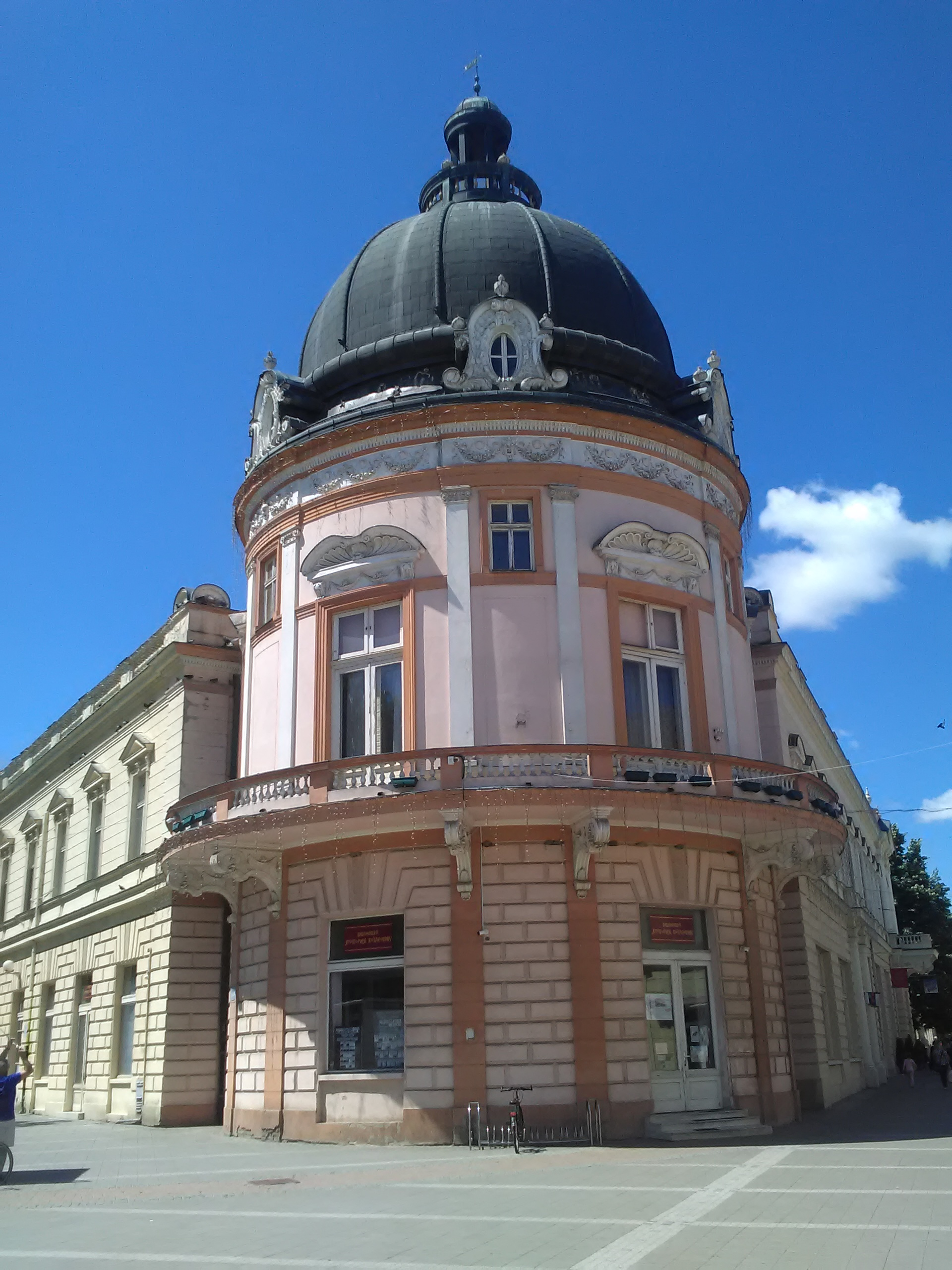
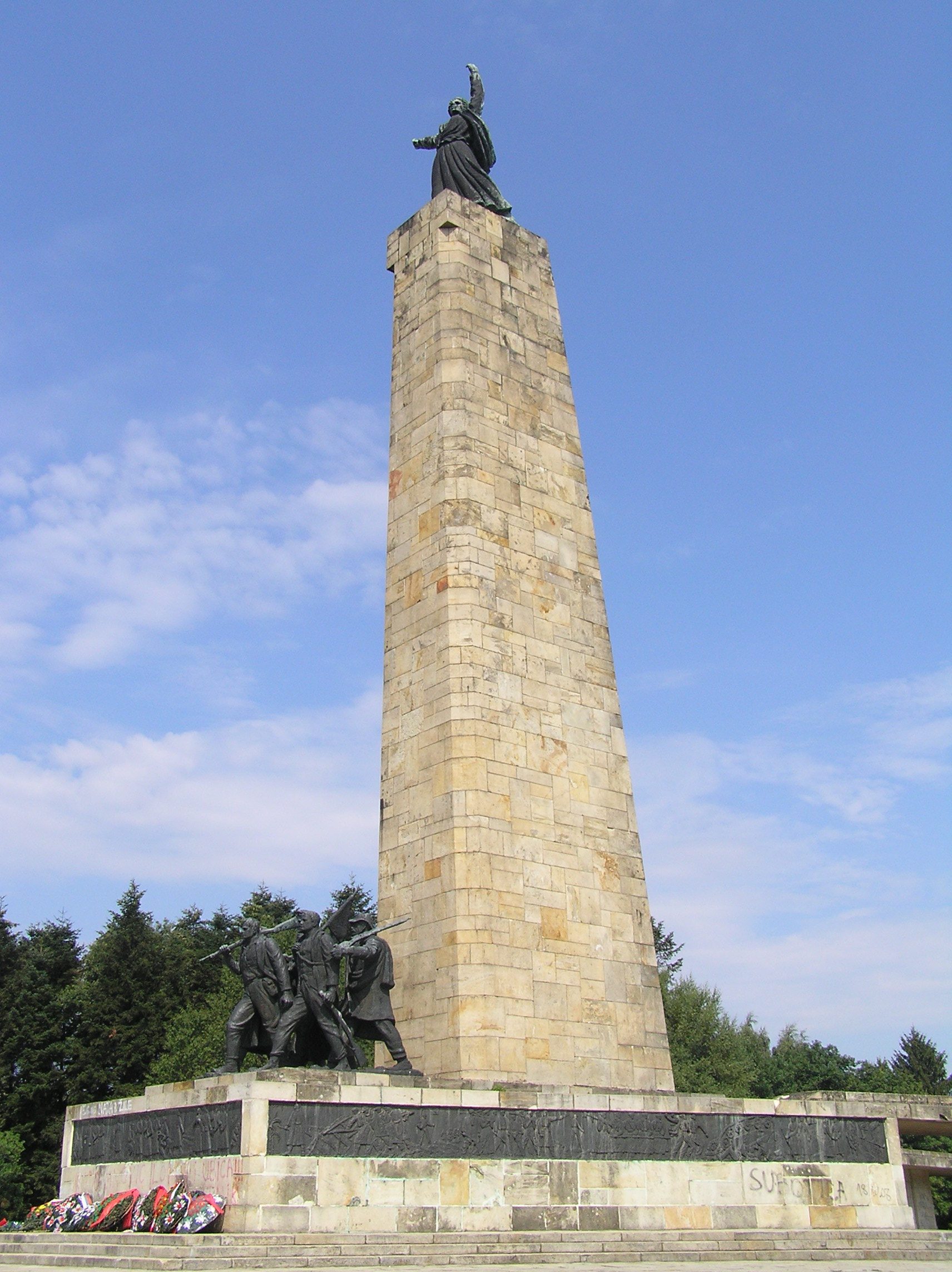
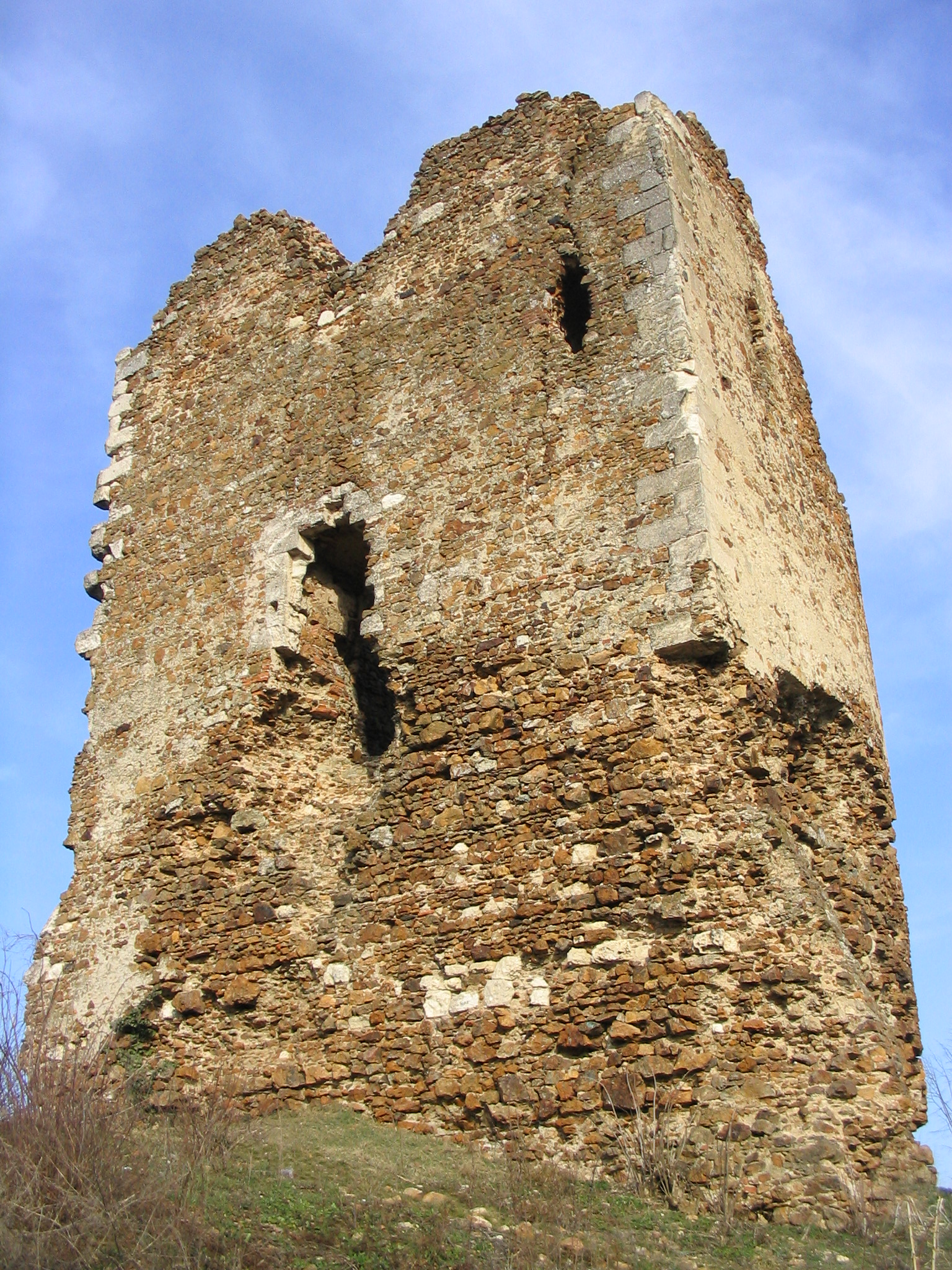
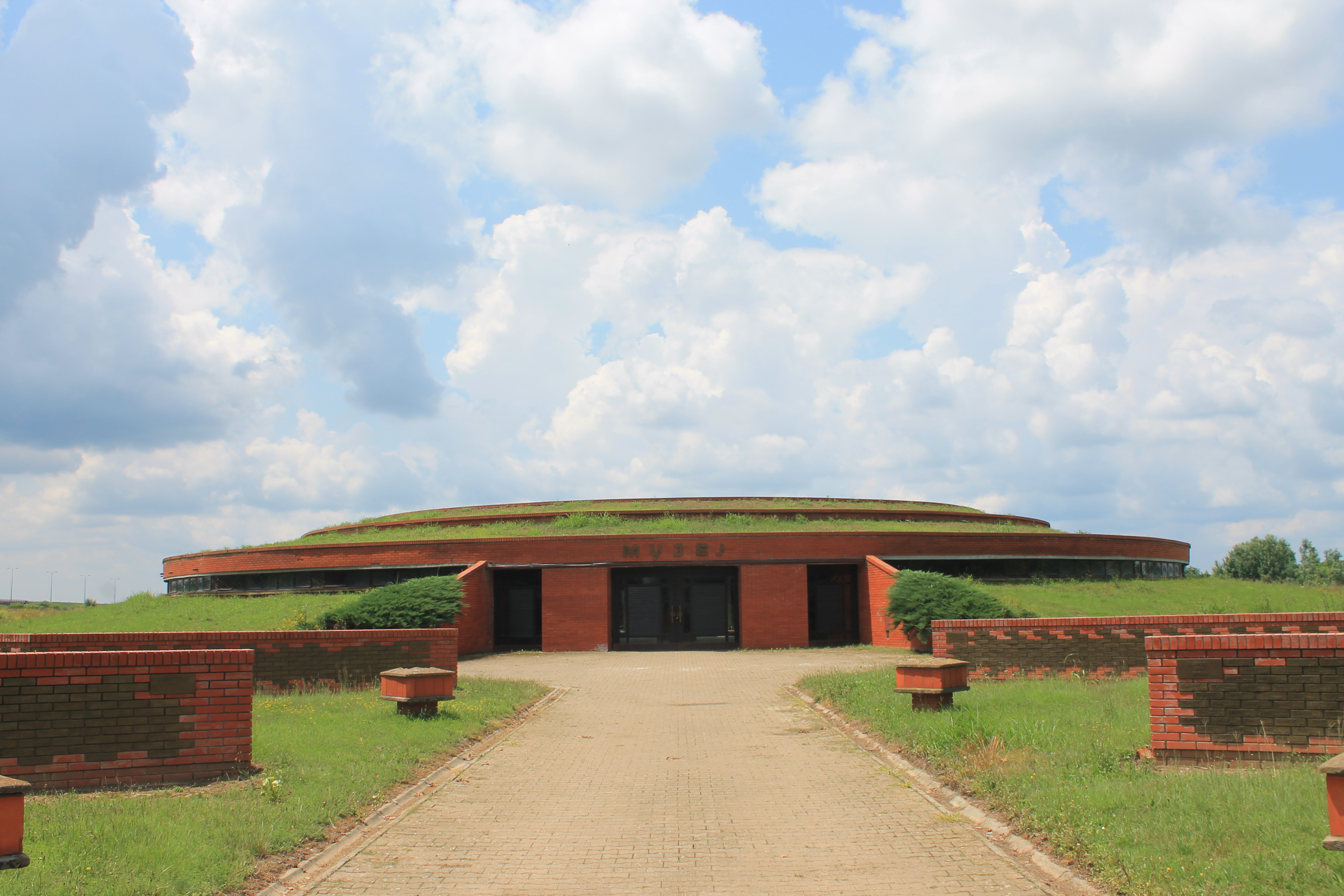
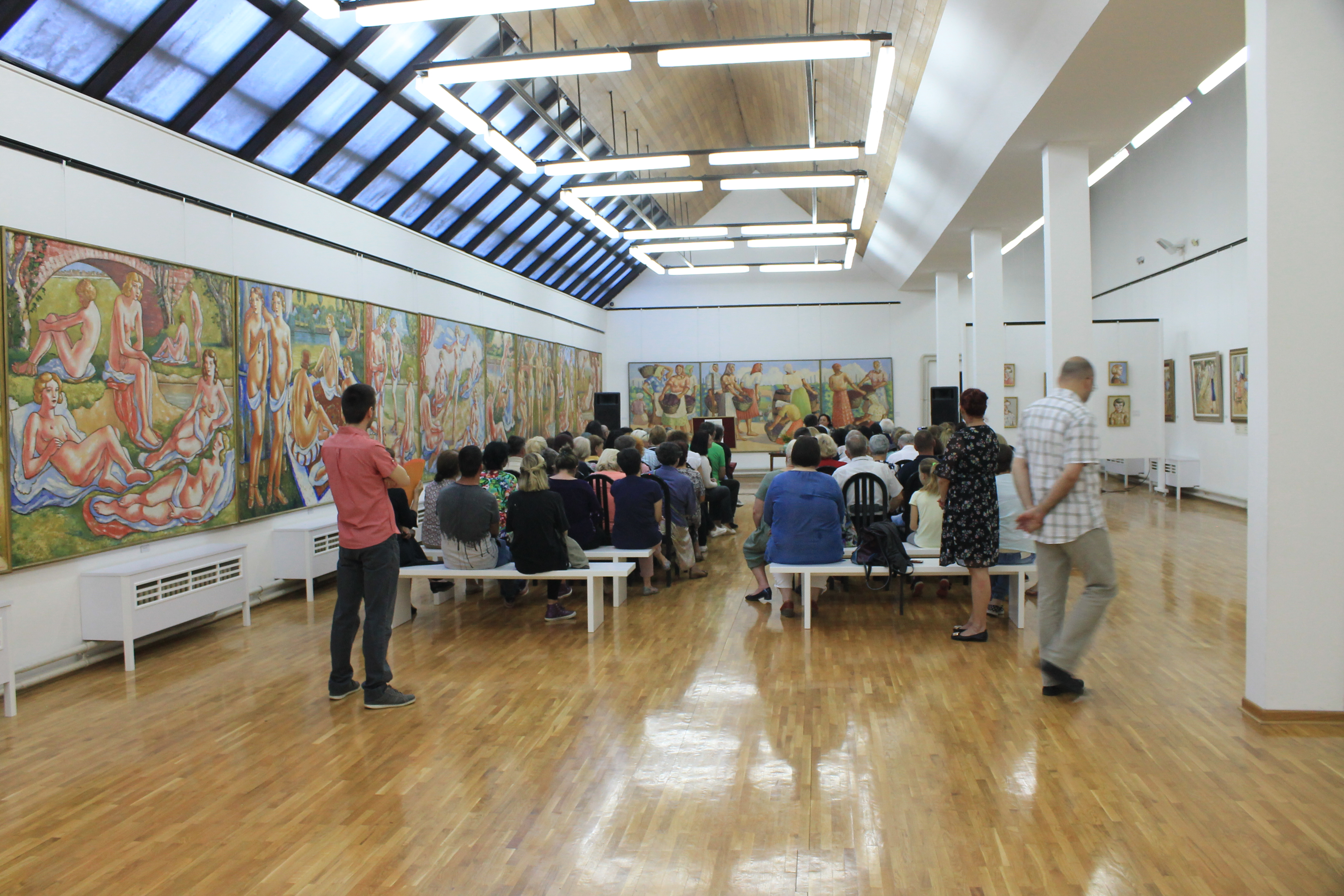
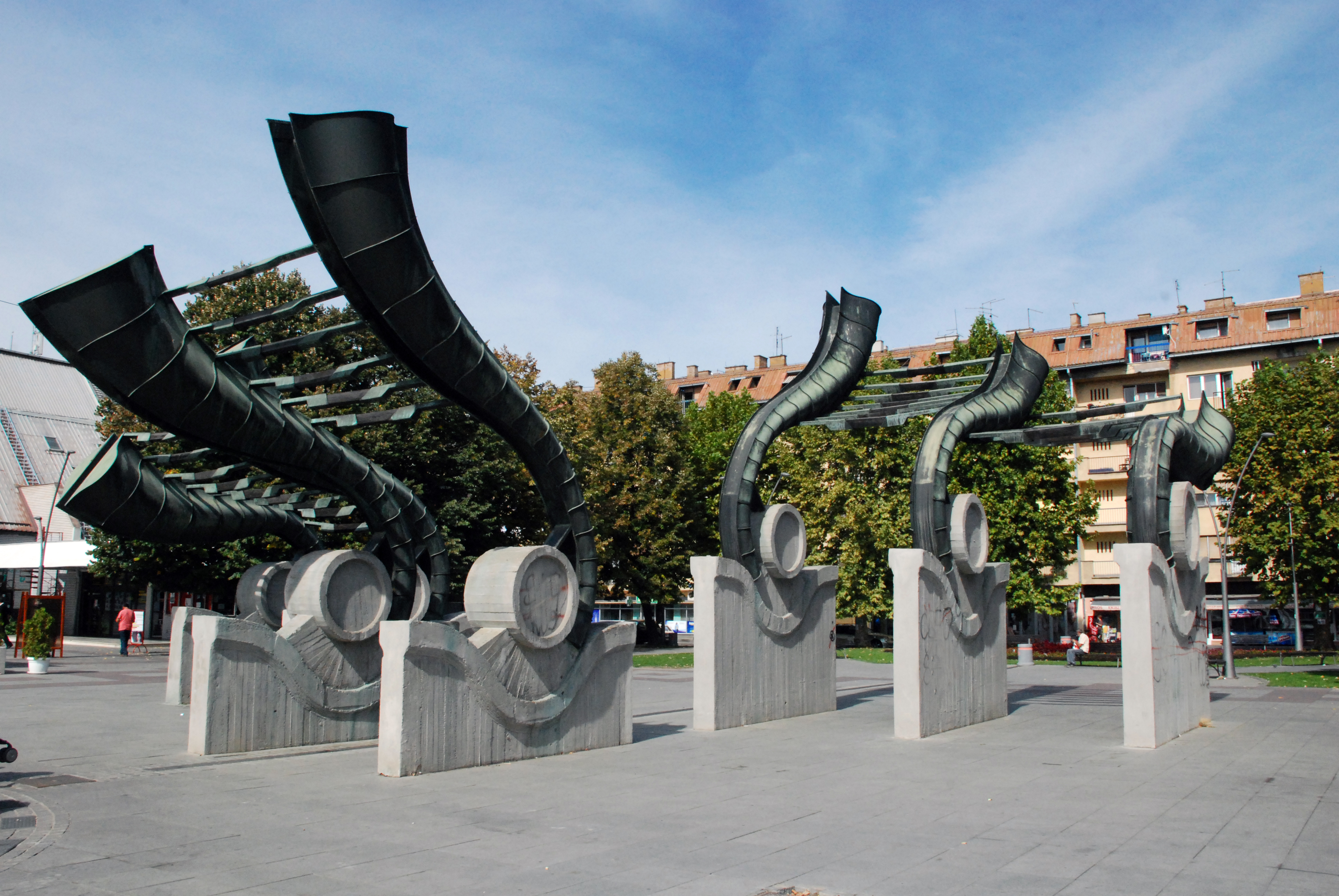
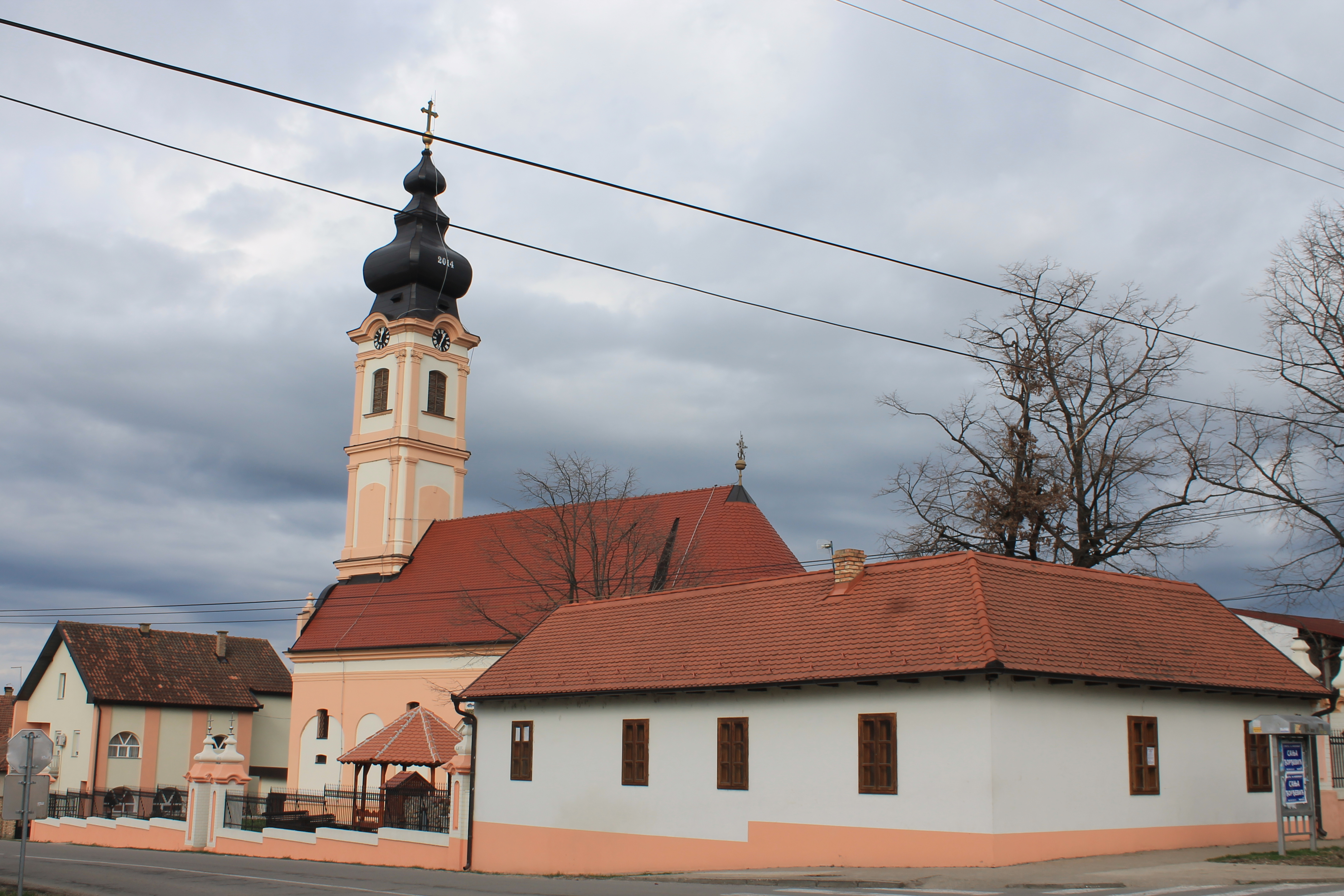
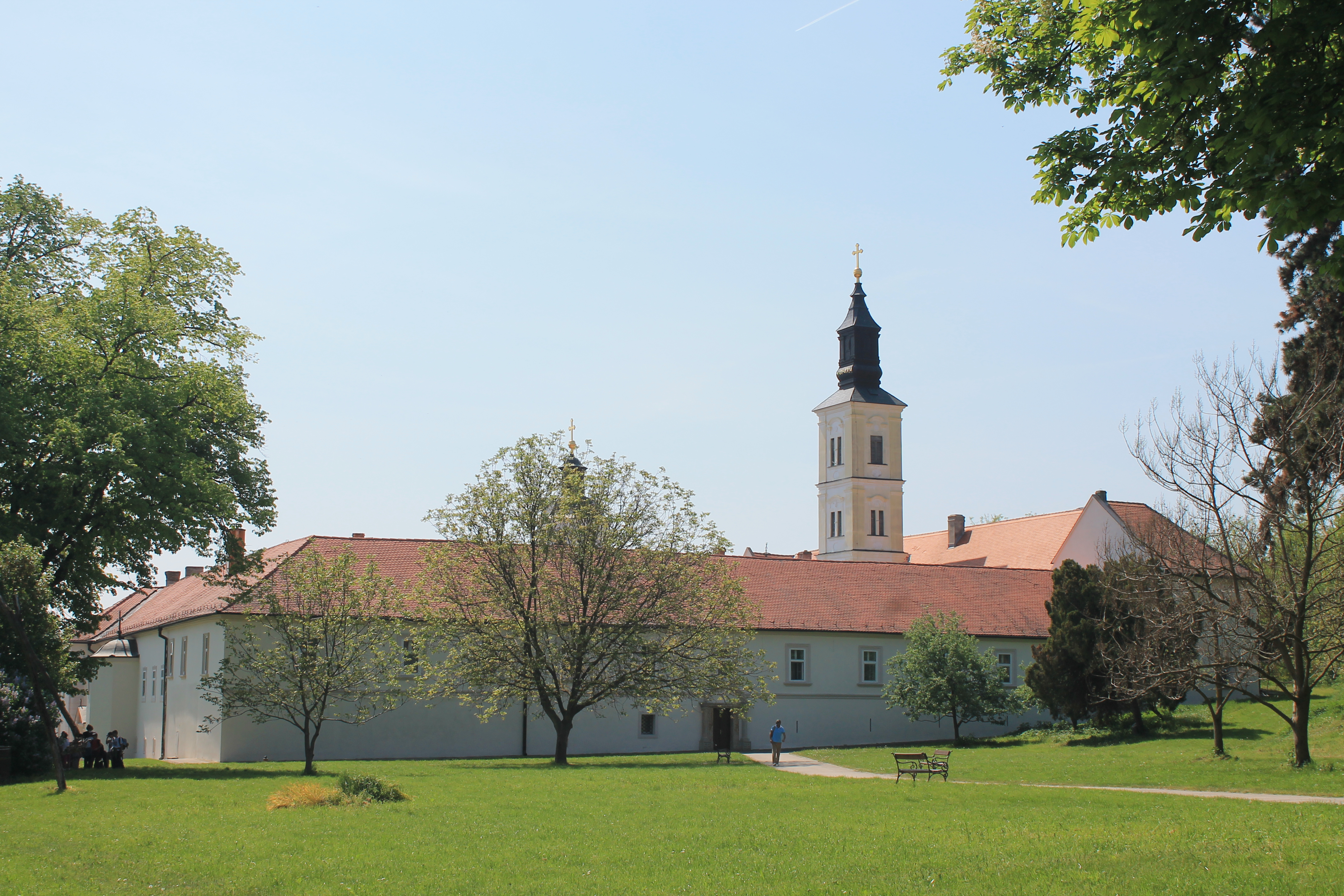
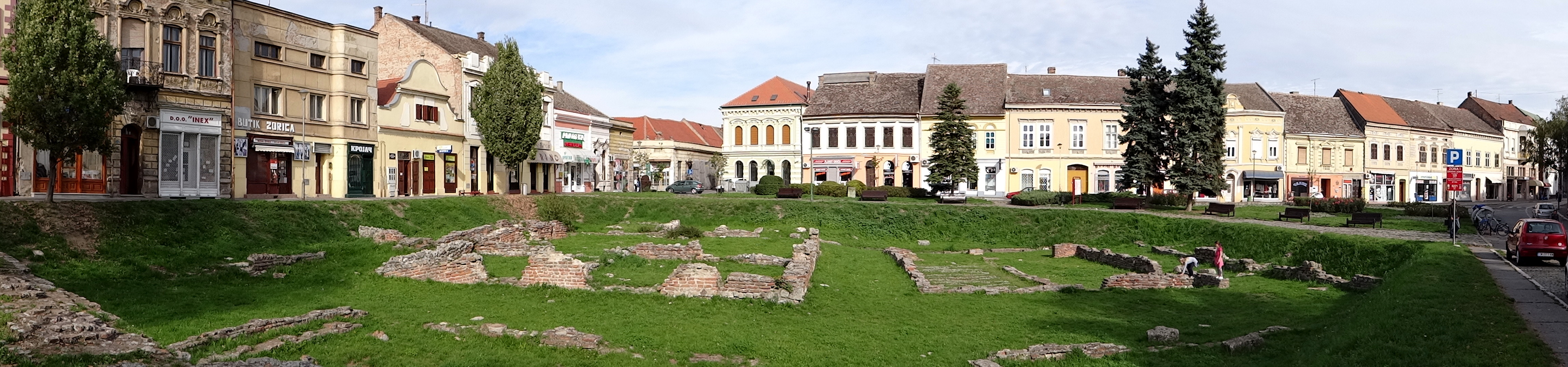
- Images from the Srem District

- Location of district in Serbia
- Coordinates: 44°59′N 19°37′E
- Country: Serbia
- Province: Vojvodina
- Administrative center: Sremska Mitrovica

Government
  - Commissioner: Dušanka Nuleši

Area
  - Total: 3,486 km^{2} (1,346 sq mi)

Population (2022)
  - Total: 282,547
  - Density: 81.05/km^{2} (209.9/sq mi)
- ISO 3166 code: RS-07
- Municipalities: 6 and 1 city
- Settlements: 109
- Cities and towns: 7
- Villages: 102
- Website: sremski.okrug.gov.rs

The Srem District (Serbian: Сремски округ, romanized: Sremski okrug, pronounced [srɛ̂ːmskiː ôkruːɡ]) is one of administrative districts of Serbia. It lies in the geographical regions of Syrmia and Mačva. According to the 2022 census, the Srem District has a population of 282,547 inhabitants. The administrative center is the city of Sremska Mitrovica.

== History ==
In Late antiquity, between the 3rd and 5th centuries, the city of Sirmium (present-day Sremska Mitrovica) was a capital of the Roman province of Pannonia Secunda. In the 6th century Sirmium was the capital of Byzantine Pannonia. In the 7th century, during Avar administration, the area was ruled by Bulgar local ruler Kuber, while in the 11th century, it was ruled by independent Bulgarian-Slavic duke Sermon. In the 11th century, it was part of the Byzantine Theme of Sirmium.

During the administration of the medieval Kingdom of Hungary (12th–16th century), the area was divided between Sirmiensis and Valkoensis counties. During Ottoman administration (16th–18th century), the area was initially a part of the vassal Ottoman duchy of Syrmia ruled by Serb duke Radoslav Čelnik and was subsequently included into the Sanjak of Syrmia.

At the end of the Austro-Russian-Turkish War of 1735–1739, there was a migration of Albanians from the Kelmendi tribe to Srem, who were recorded as speaking Albanian as late as 1921.

During Habsburg administration (18th-19th century), the area was divided between the Syrmia County and the Military Frontier. In the 1850s, northern parts of the area were part of the Novi Sad District, but were again included into Syrmia County after 1860. Since the abolishment of the Military Frontier in 1882, Syrmian parts of the Frontier were also included into Syrmia County.

During the royal Serb-Croat-Slovene (Yugoslav) administration (1918–1941), the area was part of the Syrmia County (1918–1922) and Syrmia Oblast (1922–1929). From 1929 to 1931, the area was divided between Danube Banovina in the north-east and Drina Banovina in the south-west, while from 1931 to 1939 the area was part of the Danube Banovina. From 1939 to 1941, north-western parts of the area were part of the Banovina of Croatia.

During the German-Croatian Axis occupation (1941–1944), the area was included into the Grand County of Vuka. Since 1944, the area was part of autonomous Yugoslav Vojvodina (which was part of newly established Socialist Republic of Serbia since 1945). The present-day administrative districts of Serbia (including Srem District) were established in 1992 by the decree of the Government of Serbia.

== Cities and municipalities ==
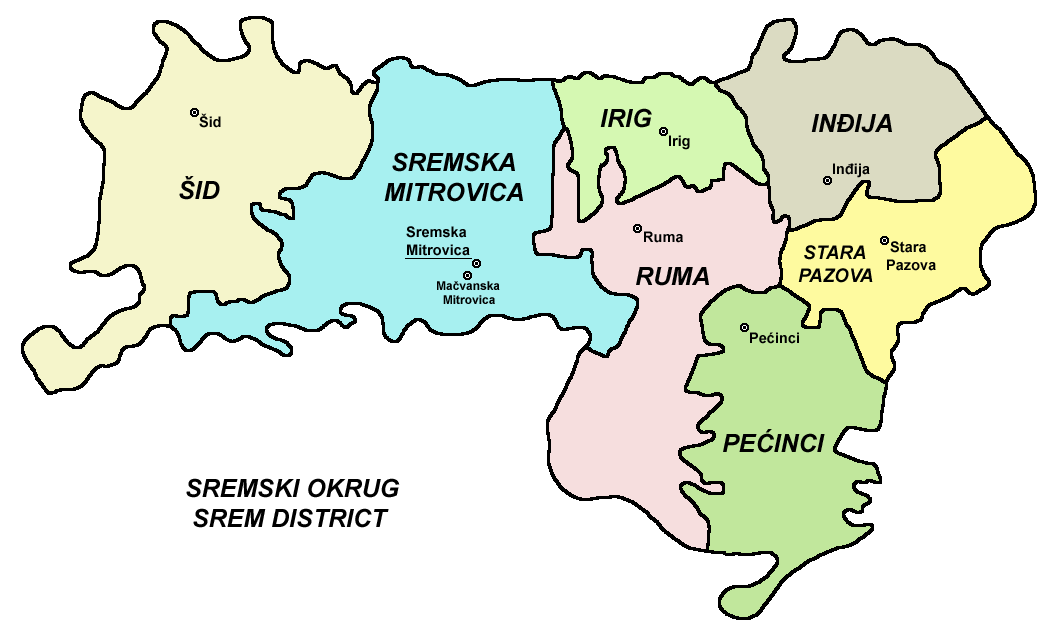
Map of the Srem District

The Srem District encompasses the territories of one city and six municipalities:

- Sremska Mitrovica (city)
- Inđija (municipality)
- Irig (municipality)
- Pećinci (municipality)
- Ruma (municipality)
- Stara Pazova (municipality)
- Šid (municipality)

== Demographics ==
Historical population
Year	Pop.	±%
1948	209,943	—
1953	223,642	+6.5%
1961	260,226	+16.4%
1971	287,474	+10.5%
1981	306,085	+6.5%
1991	309,981	+1.3%
2002	335,901	+8.4%
2011	312,278	−7.0%
2022	282,547	−9.5%

=== Towns ===
There are six towns with over 10,000 inhabitants.

- Sremska Mitrovica: 36,764
- Ruma: 27,747
- Inđija: 24,450
- Stara Pazova: 18,522
- Nova Pazova: 16,115
- Šid: 12,618

=== Ethnic structure ===
Ethnicity	Population	Share
Serbs	238,200	84.3%
Slovaks	6,179	2.2%
Croats	5,741	2%
Roma	5,493	1.9%
Hungarians	2,956	1%
Others	6,523	2.3%
Undeclared/Unknown	17,455	6.1%

== See also ==
- Administrative districts of Serbia
- Administrative divisions of Serbia
