= Forest of Bojcin =

Forest in Serbia

Coordinates: 44.744°N 20.137°E

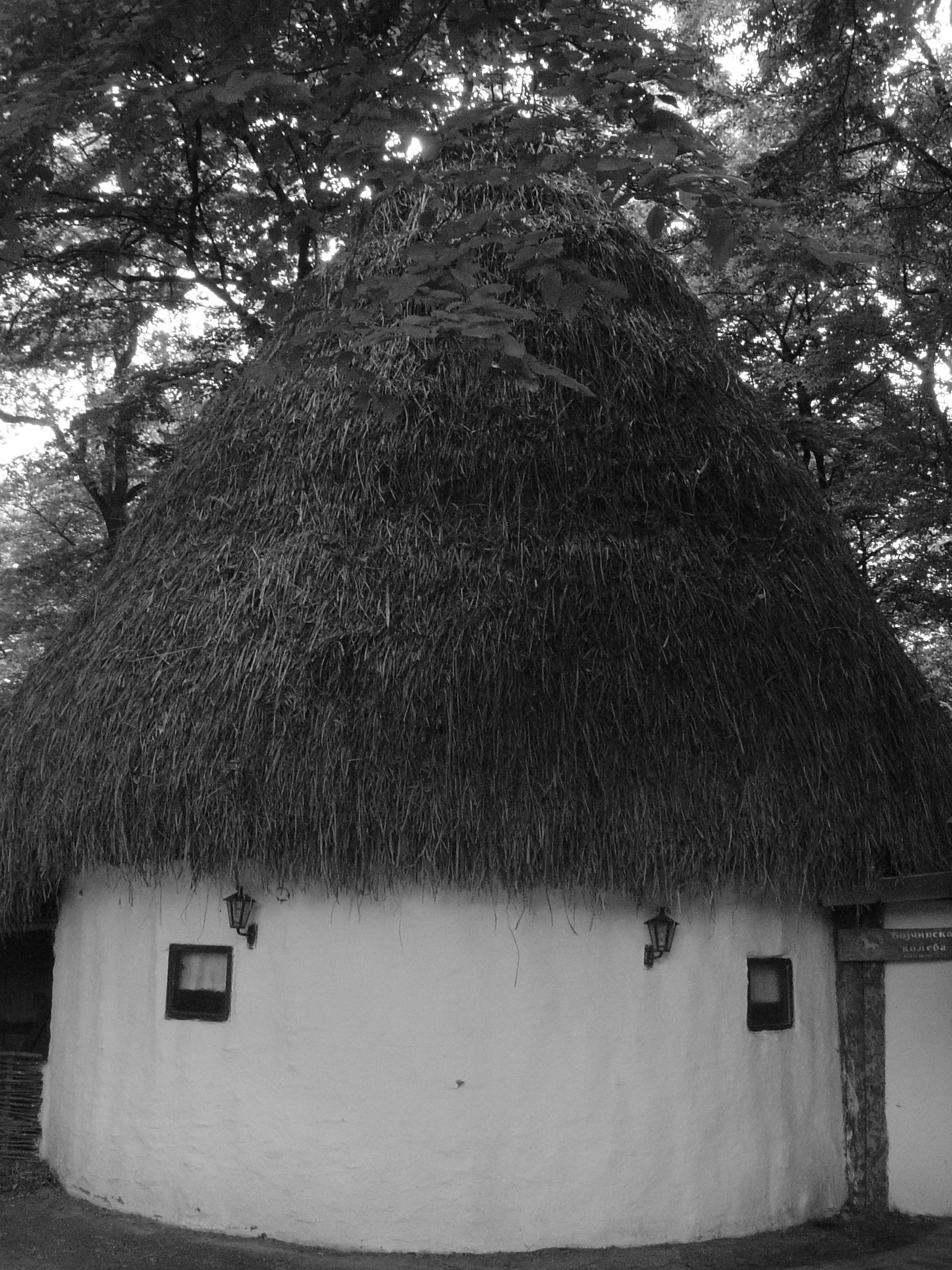
Restaurant “Bojčinska koleba“, modelled on Srem houses for pigs

Forest of Bojčin is a swampy forest protected by the government of Serbia. It lies between the village of Progar (nearest), Boljevci and Ašanja, in the municipality of Surčin. It belongs to the region of Obedska bara. It lies in the plain region of southeastern Srem, the south-western edge of Belgrade, 30 kilometers from the center, and between the river Sava and Јarčina channel. The forest serves as a resort, with a number of content. Since 1965, it is a protected natural monument.

== History ==
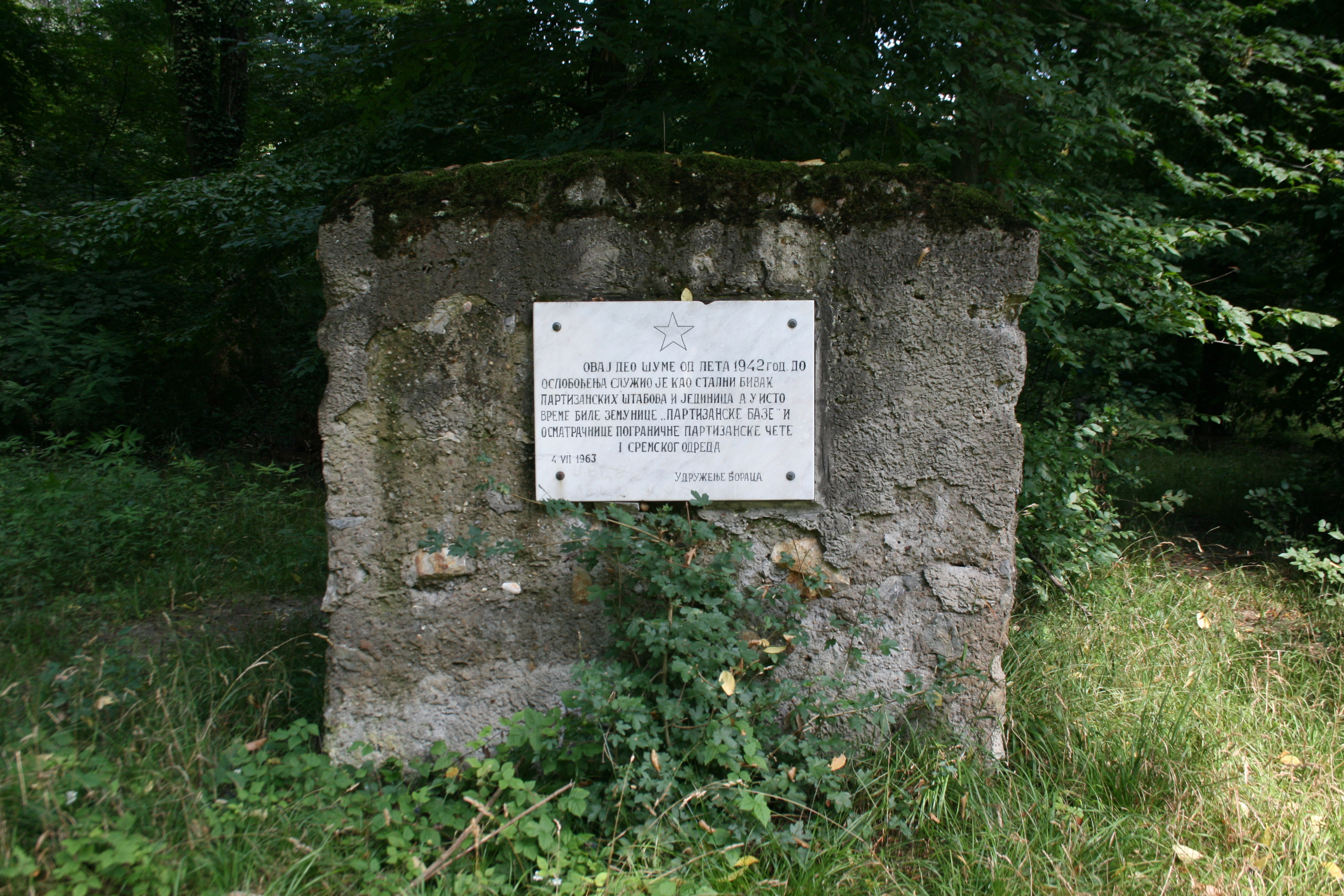
Part of the forest in which partisan staffs and units in "partisan bases" were located from the summer of 1942 until the end of the war - dug outs and watchtowers of the border troop of the First Srem Partisan Unit. Memorial plaque 4 July 1963

During the First World War, residents and soldiers found shelter in the forest. King Alexander used it as a hunting ground (1934). During the Second World War, Forest of Bojčin was a very important political, military and economic center. In 1941, a partisan uprising was staged in the forest in Donji Srem. People from the surrounding villages also hid in the forest, fleeing from enemies - especially the Germans and the ustashas. In more than one base under the ground, which have been saved to date, many of the fighters from Central Serbia continued for east Bosnia during the remainder of the war, after crossing the Sava River and taking a short stop in order to recover and train, and then took part in heated battles against the enemy. A tarmac road leads to the partisan bases through the middle of the forest. At a distance of 2 km from the entrance to the forest, on the site where the partisan bases where Srem army hid in the dugouts and catacombs once stood, there is a memorial set up in 1963. The place is a bit neglected and left to oblivion. In the continuation, the following 3 km, there is a pond and mud, and it is quite difficult to get through. Due to its natural value, historical significance and monumental buildings with preserved properties, the Forest of Bojčin was protected as early as 1965 as a natural memorial monument.

=== National Liberation memorial characteristics ===
At the edge of the Forest of Bojčin, on the right side of the road for Progar, a monument in the form of a concrete pillar was erected on a pedestal of rough hewn stone of rectangular shape. On the right side of the pillar, a white marble plaque is built in with the text: "In the year 1942 the first battle in the southeastern Srem between partisans and ustashas took place in this forest. July 4, 1960, Alliance fighters of the NLW". Concrete memorial in the form of a rectangle is located in the Forest of Bojčin, 2 km from the forester's cottage, on the right side of the road for Ašanja. A white marble plaque is built in with the inscription: "Since 1942 to liberation, this part of the forest served as a permanent bivouac of partisan staffs and units and at the same time as winter stores of partisan bases and observation posts of the border troops of the First Srem Detachment. July 4, 1963. Association of veterans."

== Flora, fauna, and funga ==
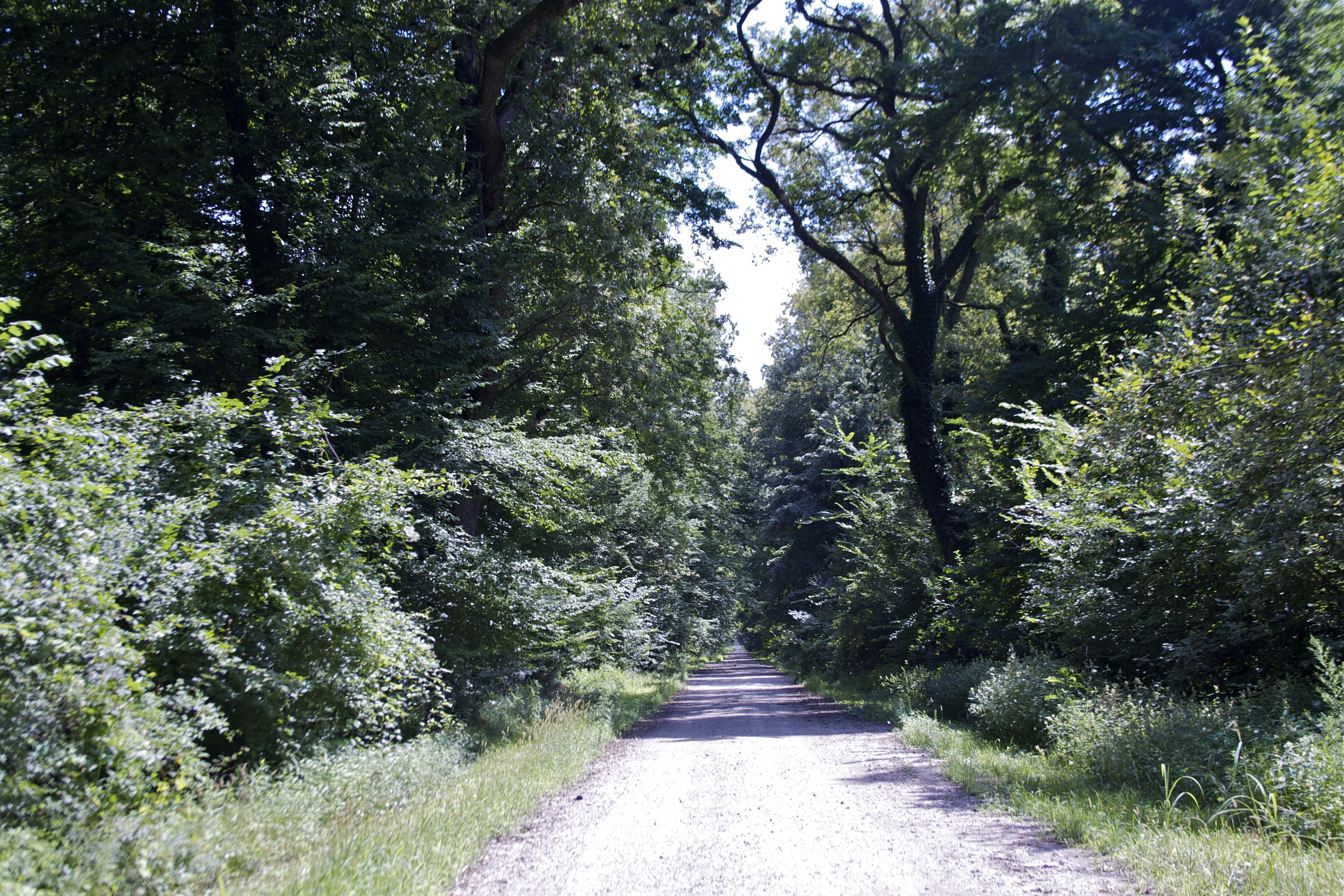
Through the Forest of Bojčin

The forest occupies an area of 629.51 ha. Red oak is particularly represented in its territory, as a fragment of the old, once enormous, lowland forest wetland. In the forest, there is a total of 185 recorded species, of which 15 have the status of protected and strictly protected species. One hundred and sixty-five (165) species of fungi grow in the forest, 15 of which with protection status, while two species are on the European Red List of mushrooms in Europe. Besides the oak, the forest is rich with hornbeam and linden, there are also poplar, dogwood, elderberry and wild rose. Wild garlic grows in one part of the forest, while in the spring there are a lot of wild strawberries, in swampy areas there is iris, and very frequently fennel. One hundred and eight (108) species of birds were recorded in the forest, i.e. 30% of the total number of bird species recorded in Serbia. Also, there are 10 species of amphibians and reptiles, of which as many as 8 species is protected by law. When it comes to animals which roam freely through the forest, rabbits and elk can be seen. Swineherds keep their pigs in the forest, and wild pigs that feed on acorns can also be found. A large number of insects also lives there, of which the most notable are mosquitoes, horseflies and hornets. The area is still relatively preserved, has great natural value, but it is in danger of further degradation due to its proximity to the urban zone, which is why it has been put under protection.

== Summer stage ==
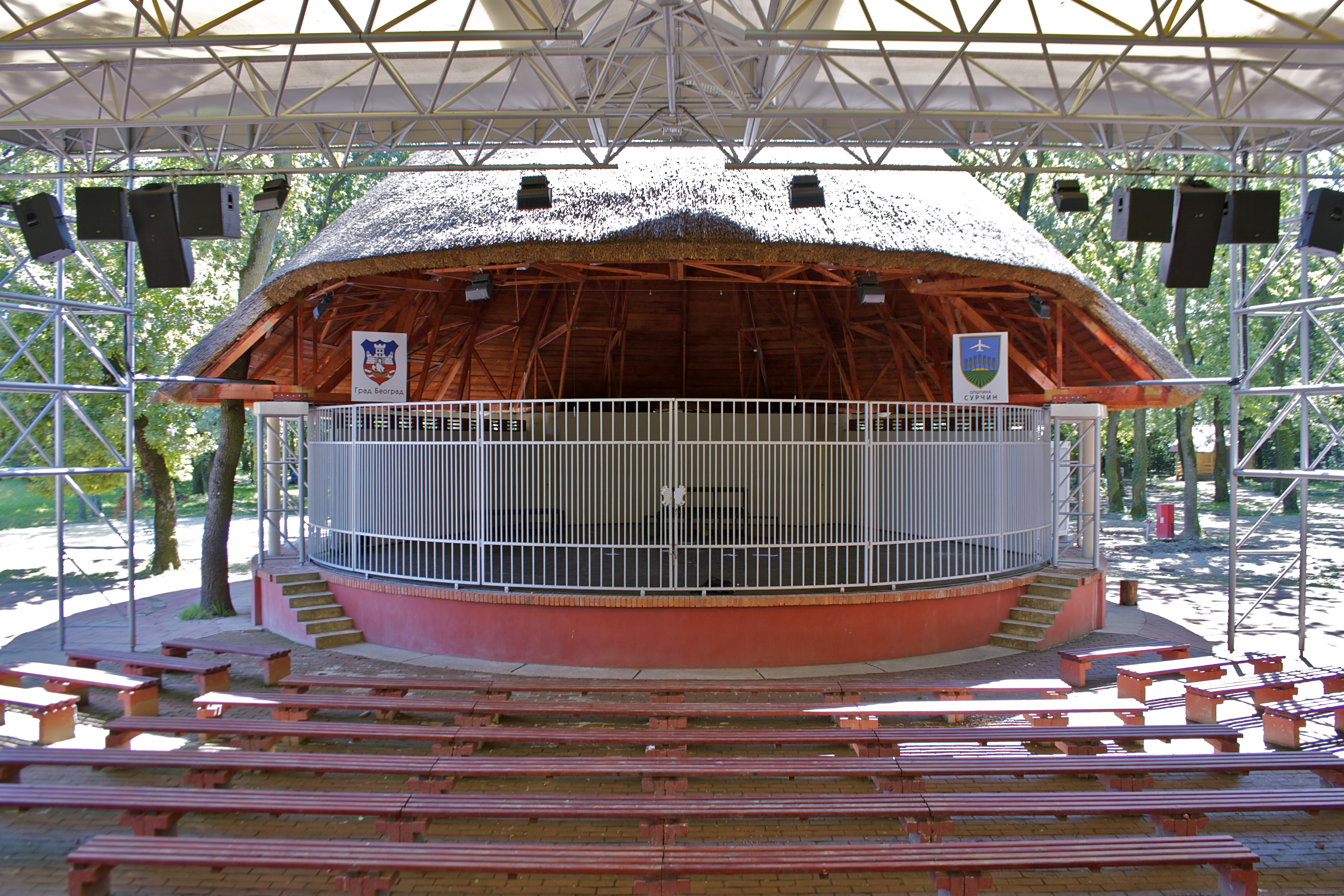
Summer Stage on the edge of the Forest of Bojčin near Progar

At the edge of the Forest of Bojčin, a summer theater was built in 2010, designed by architect Zdravko Milinković. The stage is covered with thick reeds, with a scenic diameter of 16 meters. Apart from the stage, there are two dressing rooms and a covered amphitheater auditorium for 1,000 visitors. Directly behind the stage, an art colony was built in the same year, consisting of six wooden houses at a distance of about twenty meters. Each house has a room of 12 m^{2}, bathroom and a terrace of 10 m^{2}, and the space is air conditioned. Next to the stage, there is an ethno restaurant "Bojčinska koleba", a catering facility consisting of typical Srem houses for pigs, covered with reeds. Folds with mangalitsas are located in the vicinity of the restaurant.

== Events ==
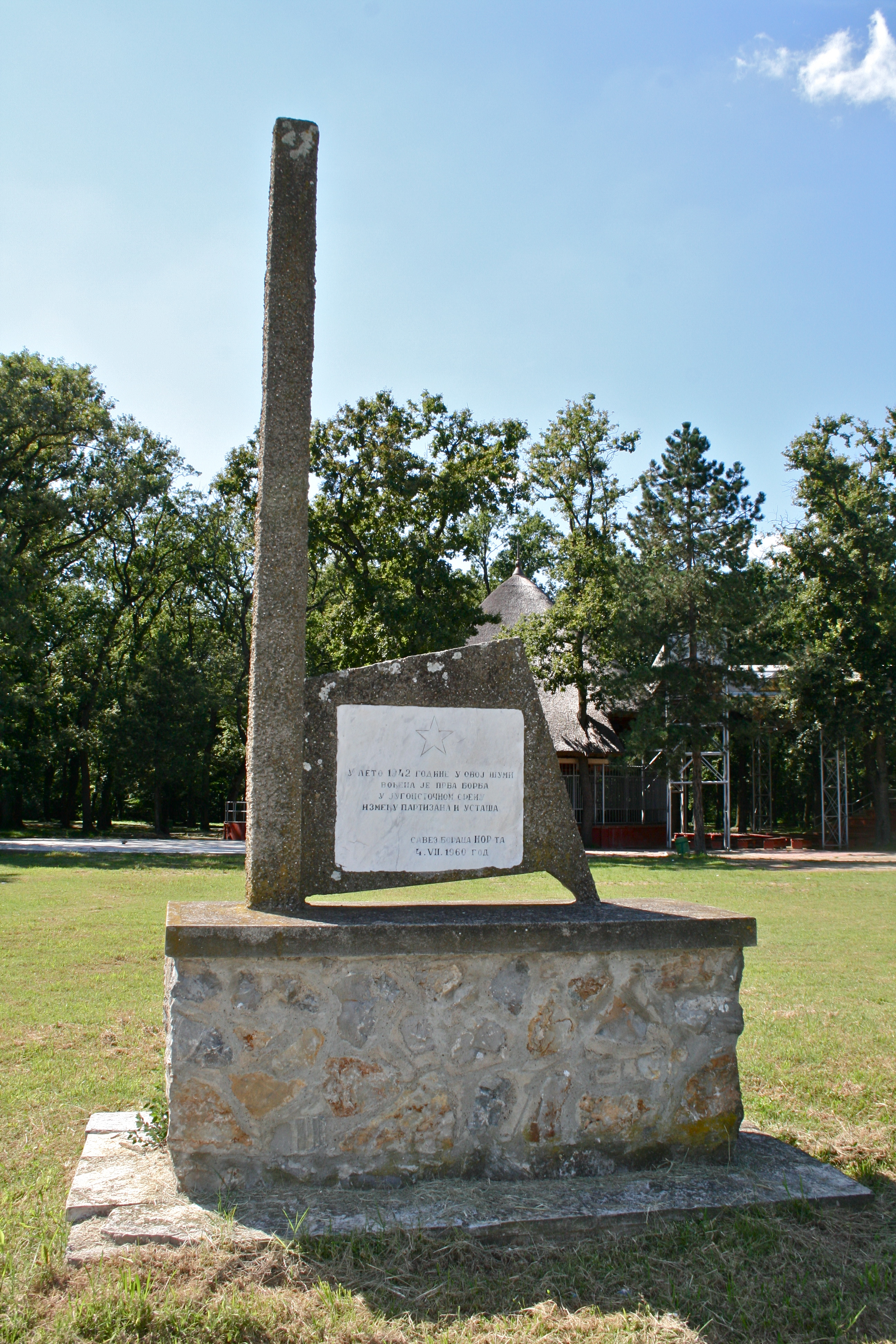
NLS Memorial in the Forest of Bojčin

- Although the new government in 2001 abolished fighter Veteran Day and Day of the Uprising of the People of Serbia, in the Forest of Bojčin, holidays are still celebrated traditionally, on 4 July and 7 July, in the organization of the City Board of FAVNLW Belgrade and the Municipality of Rakovica, as the memory of the beginning of the antifascist battle. The Veterans’ Monument was transferred from Srem into the forest, which stood in front of the municipal building in the center of Surčin until July 2, 2012, during the past 55 years, sparking protests of citizens. Besides this monument, at the entrance to the Forest of Bojčin, near the road for Progar, there is a monument to the first battle between the partisans and the ustashas in southeastern Srem in the summer of 1942. The monument was erected in 1960.
- Bojčin Cultural Summer is a cultural and artistic festival held since 2009, every weekend, lasting for 5 months, from early May to late September. The program consists of poetry evenings, theater performances, music concerts, where folk music, rock, pop, ragtime, fado, jazz and classical music is performed. They are also other forms of theatrical activity. A large number of volunteers is also involved in the organization of the event. Entrance to Bojčin Cultural Summer is free for each program, but visitors can make donations.
- Art colonies:
  - sculpture colony is located in open space, where artists handle traditional and new materials using different technological methods.
  - painting

== Recreation ==
There is a jogging trail 2 km long with 16 obstacles, carriage rides and horseback riding on Lipizzaner horses, organized by the equestrian club "Bojčin".

== Transport ==
One can reach the edge of the Forest of Bojčin by a local bus, bus 605, which departs from Bežanija from Ledine, passes through Surčin, Јakovo and Boljevci before arriving in Progar. The same road can be taken by car from Belgrade, or from highway E70 by taking a detour at the airport in Surčin from the direction of Kupinovo and Ašanja or Bečmen and Petrovčić, and from Obrenovac, one can arrive across the Obrenovac-Surčin Bridge over the Sava River. In the summer season, it is possible to arrive via public transportation boat, which leaves from Block 45 and sails across Sava to Progar.
