= Jarčina =

- Native name: Јарчина (Serbian)

Location
- Country: Serbia

Physical characteristics
- Source
  - location: Fruška Gora, Vojvodina, Serbia (as the Međeš river)
  - elevation: 480 m (1,570 ft)
- Mouth
  - location: Sava river at Progar, Serbia (as the Progarska Jarčina canal)
  - coordinates: 44.7158°N 20.1496°E
- Length: 53 km (33 mi)

Basin features
- Progression: Sava→ Danube→ Black Sea

The Jarčina (Serbian: Јарчина) is a system of rivers and canals in the Srem region of Vojvodina province of Serbia with a total length of 53 km, which empties into the Sava river. The system includes the Međeš river-Jarčina Galovica canal-Progarska Jarčina course.

== Međeš ==
The upper section of the system is the natural flow of the 27 km-long Međeš river. It originates from the Iriški Venac peak on the eastern slopes of the Fruška Gora mountain, at an altitude of 480 m. The Međeš flows to the south, next to the Grgeteg monastery and the villages of Šatrinci, Dobrodol and Žarkovac and receives many smaller streams flowing down from the Fruška Gora. At the village of Putinci, the river makes a small elbow turn and at the village of Donji Petrovci, receives the Šelovrnac river from the right and enters the channeled section of its flow, at an altitude of 90 m.

== Jarčina-Galovica ==
Initially, the canal splits in two directions, the Jarkovačka Jarčina and Jarčina-Galovica canals. The former flows to the west into the Sava river at the village of Jarak, east of the town of Sremska Mitrovica. The latter continues to the south for 4 km, next to the villages of Popinci before it crosses the Galovica canal at the village of Prhovo.

== Progarska Jarčina ==
From that point, the 22 km-long canal is known as the Progarska Jarčina. It receives the Krivaja river from the left and at the village of Ašanja, north of the Obedska bara bog, the canal turns east and leaves Vojvodina and enters the Belgrade City area, where it empties into the Sava at the village of Progar (municipality of Surčin), at an altitude of 70 m. In this section, the canal flows through the Podlužje sub-region of the region of Srem, next to the Živača lake and swamp, used for the Boljevci fish pond. The canal also marks the western border of the Belgrade's marshy forest of Bojčinska šuma.
