= Obrenovac-Surčin Bridge =

Bridge in Belgrade, Serbia

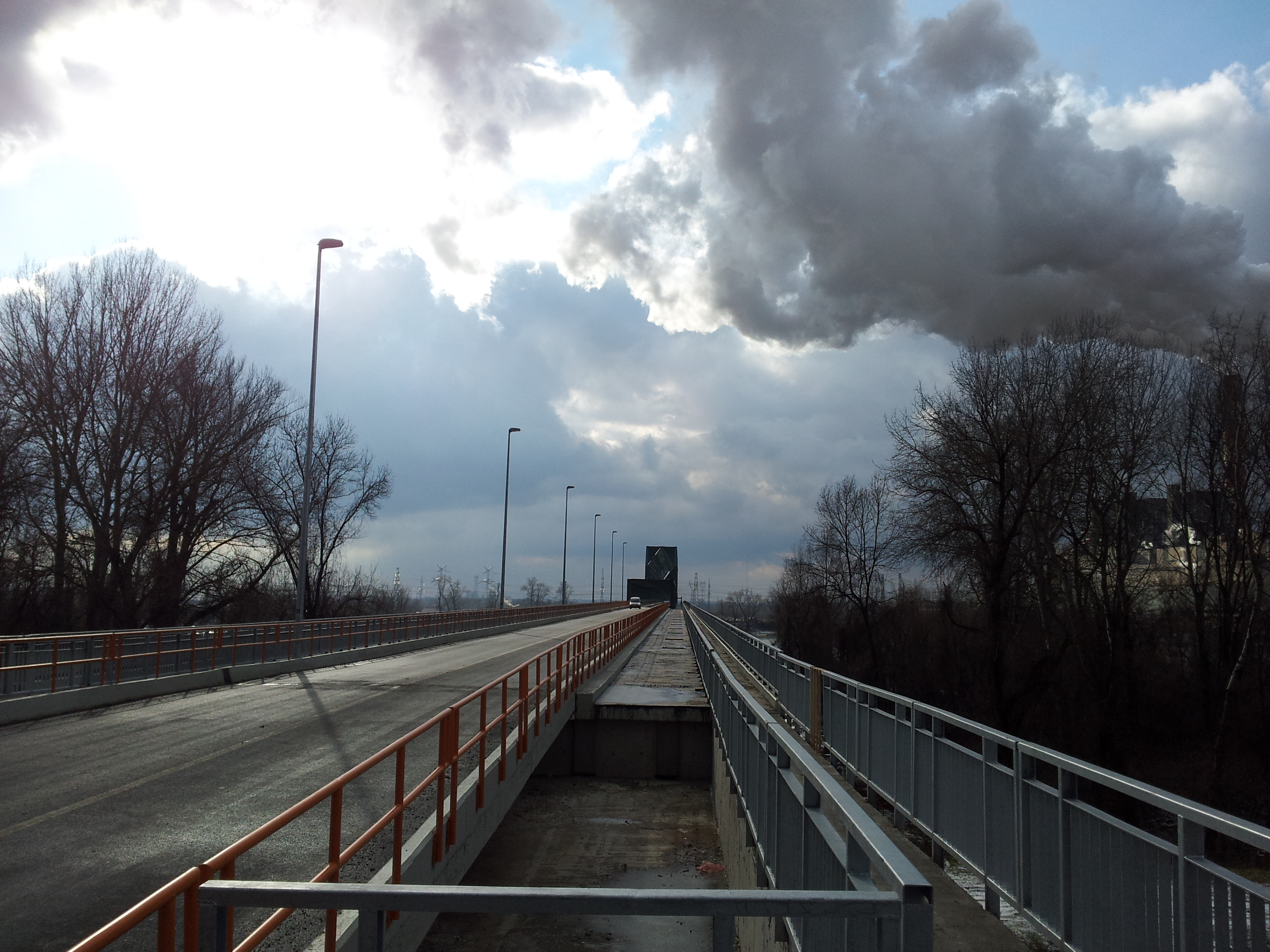
- View on the Obrenovac side; smoke on the right side is from the TPP Nikola Tesla
- Coordinates: 44.673515°N 20.166812°E
- Carries: 2 lanes
- Crosses: Sava river
- Locale: Municipalities of Obrenovac and Surčin; City of Belgrade, Serbia
- Other name(s): Мост Обреновац-Сурчин; Most Obrenovac-Surčin
- Maintained by: Putevi Srbije

Characteristics
- Total length: 627.8 m (2,060 ft)
- Width: 14.5 m (48 ft)
- Height: 16.5 m (54 ft)
- Longest span: 141 m (463 ft)

History
- Construction start: 1994; 32 years ago
- Opened: December 1, 2011; 14 years ago

Statistics
- Toll: toll-free

Location
- Interactive map of Obrenovac-Surčin Bridge

The Obrenovac-Surčin Bridge (Serbian: Мост Обреновац-Сурчин, romanized: Most Obrenovac-Surčin) is the bridge crossing the river Sava in the suburban section of Belgrade, the capital of Serbia. With the partially steel and partially concrete construction today, the building of the bridge began in 1994 when it was conceived as the carrier for the district heating pipeline. The works were halted in 1997 and the project was adapted to include the carriageways. Construction was resumed in 2010 and the bridge was opened on 1 December 2011.

== Location ==
The bridge is located just west of Obrenovac, spanning the river from the village of Urovci, right next to the TPP Nikola Tesla power plant (TENT). It connects the Lower Kolubara region with Syrmia, near Progar, in the municipality of Surčin.

The bridge is part of the Sremska gazela ("Syrmian gazelle") road, as of 2017 still under construction, which is to connect Obrenovac with the interchange loop at Dobanovci, on the European route E70. The road is supposed to be 21 km (13 mi) long. So far, the 1 km (0.62 mi) long access road to Boljevci was built (regional road 267), which connects it to Surčin. On the Obrenovac side, the 1 km (0.62 mi) access road to the R101 road (Obrenovac-Ub-Valjevo) has also been built.

== History ==
The bridge was originally projected as the carrier for the district heating pipeline, hence the closeness to the power plant.), The foundation stone was set on the Obrenovac side in 1994, during the mayoral tenure of Nebojša Čović, and it was supposed to connect the plant with the New Belgrade. In 1997 the project was changed to include the possibility of transporting tanks and other military technics and then the idea was expanded to include the regular traffic. Due to the financial constraints, the works were halted in 1998 and the NATO bombing of Serbia in 1999 pushed this project out of any future plans as so much other infrastructure had to be repaired. In the next years nothing new was done as works included only the maintenance of the already placed steel construction and the reparation of one of the pillars which was damaged by the barge.

The idea resurfaced in 2006 when the discussions were held on the profitability of the heating pipeline and eventually the pipeline idea was dropped. Initiated by mayor Dragan Đilas, tentative works on further building began in April 2010 and the full blown construction ensued in 2011. The bridge was opened, as planned, on 1 December 2011.

== Characteristics ==
The Obrenovac-Surčin bridge is the only one on the 70 km (43 mi) long section of the Sava, between Šabac and Ostružnica.

It consists of two different constructions, the steel and the concrete one. The steel section is 446.5 m (1,465 ft) long and consists of the six pieces of steel deck superstructure. The grid was assembled on the bank and then elevated via the floating crane. The bridge is constructed in the style of the typical beam bridge. The concrete section is located on the Progar side of the bridge and is 181.3 m (595 ft) long. The entire construction leans on 16 pillars which are founded on Hochstrasser-Weise piles with the diameters of 1.2 to 1.5 m (3 ft 11 in to 4 ft 11 in). Total length of the bridge is 627.8 m (2,060 ft).

The bridge is 14.5 m (48 ft) wide and consists of two carriageways (3.75 m (12.3 ft) each), two pedestrian walks and the space for the pipeline, if its constructed. The longest span is 141 m (463 ft) as the Sava is an international navigable river. It is 16.5 m (54 ft) high. The works were done by the Mostogradnja company.

== Importance ==
Even though they are 25 km (16 mi) away from each other, it took 60–70 minutes from downtown Obrenovac to downtown Surčin, both centers of the Belgrade's municipalities, as the circling around amount to 90 km (56 mi). The bridge shortened the trip to only 10 minutes.

== District heating pipeline ==
The completion of the bridge revived the idea of the district heating, which was behind the idea of the bridge in the first place. Originating in the late 1970s, some works, so as the construction of the bridge, began in the 1990s: a 4.3 km (2.7 mi) long concrete canal was built from the New Belgrade heating plant to the city exit and 8 km (5.0 mi) of pipes were laid down. It was then decided that the project is unprofitable, so the pipes were taken out and the canal was covered. Majority of the heating in Belgrade is provided from the imported natural gas, while the additional heating in times of necessity is provided by the mazut which will be banned from the European Union in 2021.

The TENT would fill the pipes between Obrenovac and New Belgrade with decarburized water. In TENT, the water would then be heated in the heat exchangers via the overheated steam produced by the power plant's turbines. Several sub-pumps (Sava, Boljevci, Ostružnica) will pump the heated water into the direction of New Belgrade. The system should contain 60,000 m^{3} (2,100,000 cu ft) of circulating water. That would be enough for the base heating of the half of Belgrade's current needs (a total of 310,000 dwelling units have been connected to the district heating system). In this case, the rest of the heating will be provided by the natural gas.

The project will, for the most part, follow the old plan, but being updated with some new solutions. Old pipes can't be used as they deteriorated, and they served for the draining of the Kolubara mines after the catastrophic 2014 Southeast Europe floods, but the concreted canal can, and will be unearthed. Total length of the pipeline will be 28.7 km (17.8 mi). The bridge is projected to be a part of the new pipeline, too. In the best case scenario, the work will start in the spring of 2019 and finished by the winter of 2020–21.

However, only in October 2023 the annex of the contract with the Power Construction Corporation of China (PCCC) was signed regarding the works. The revised project will follow the same route of some 30 km (19 mi) (60 km (37 mi) of pipes). The city will get 600 MW of power from the TENT, which is one half of the capacity of the New Belgrade thermal power plant, the largest one in Belgrade. Chinese contractors said they will "expedite" the procedure, while Belgrade's mayor Aleksandar Šapić said the project will be finished in two years, by October 2025.
