= Jakovo =

Jakovo Јаково
- Suburban neighbourhood
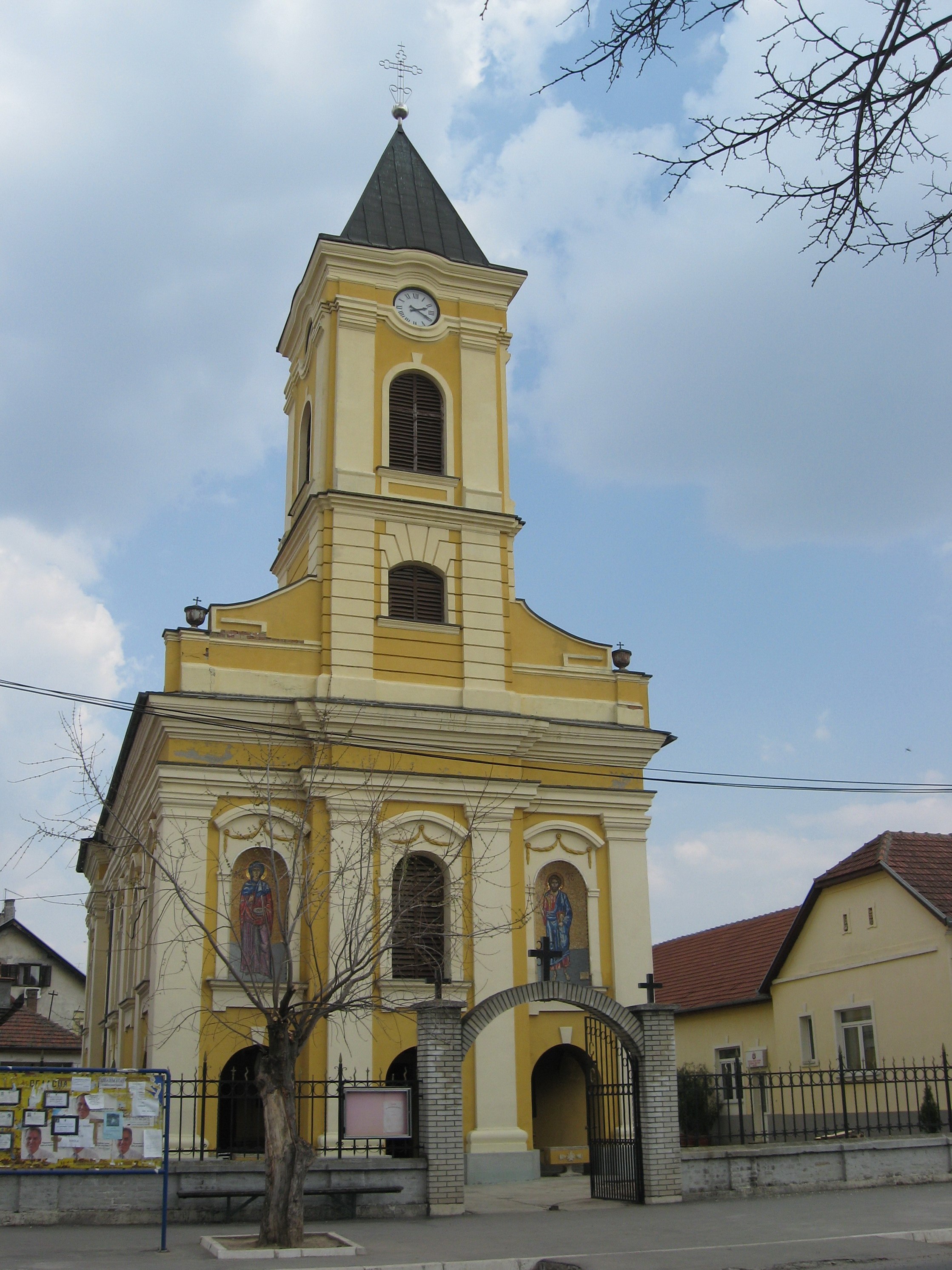
- Orthodox Church of Ascension of Christ

- Location within Belgrade
- Coordinates: 44°45′N 20°16′E
- Country: Serbia
- Region: Belgrade
- Municipality: Surčin

Area
  - Total: 31.76 km^{2} (12.26 sq mi)

Population (2011)
  - Total: 6,393
  - Density: 201.3/km^{2} (521.3/sq mi)
- Time zone: UTC+1 (CET)
  - Summer (DST): UTC+2 (CEST)
- Area code: +381(0)11
- Car plates: BG

Jakovo (Serbian Cyrillic: Јаково) is a suburban neighborhood of Belgrade, Serbia. It is located in Belgrade's municipality of Surčin.

== Location ==
Jakovo is located in the south-eastern part of Syrmia (sub-region of Podlužje), 24 kilometers south-west of downtown Belgrade and 6 kilometers south of the municipal seat of Surčin. The settlement is 4 kilometers away from the left bank of the Sava river.

== Population ==
Historical population
Year	Pop.	±%
1921	1,911	—
1931	2,018	+5.6%
1948	2,096	+3.9%
1953	2,249	+7.3%
1961	2,624	+16.7%
1971	3,123	+19.0%
1981	4,619	+47.9%
1991	5,423	+17.4%
2002	5,949	+9.7%
2011	6,393	+7.5%

Jakovo is statistically classified as a rural settlement (village). As it grows, and it experiences a steady population growth for decades, it makes almost one continuous built-up area with the neighboring settlements of Surčin, Bečmen and Boljevci. According to the latest official population census, population on Jakovo was 6,393 in 2011.

=== Ethnic structure ===
Main ethnic groups in Jakovo include:

- Serbs = 5,665 (95.23%)
- Romani = 48 (0.80%)
- Yugoslavs = 40 (0.67%)

== Characteristics ==
The remains belonging to the Scordisci, a Celtic tribe which founded Singidunum and Taurunum, the predecessors of Belgrade and Zemun, respectively, were found in Jakovo. Also, the remains of the Gepids were also discovered.

Jakovo is located in the western, finished section of the uncompleted Belgrade beltway and also on the Belgrade's internal freight railway Batajnica-Surčin-Ostružnica-Železnik-Resnik which in this section generally follows the route of the beltway.

One of the most famous Syrmian monasteries, Fenek, is located just outside the settlement, on the road to Boljevci. A riding school is also situated on the main road leading from Jakovo.

There is a beach on the Sava bank.

== Stremen ==
Stremen (Cyrillic: Стремен) is the only salaš, secluded ranch-type farms quite common in Vojvodina and Hungary, on the territory of Belgrade. It is location of the traditional horse racing fair Sremački preskok. Curiosity of the salaš is the German fiacre for transportation of 15 passengers, popularly called konjobus (omnibus). Stremen is 20 kilometers away from downtown Belgrade, but since 2008 it is also accessible via tourist boats which connect Novi Beograd's Block 45 and settlements in the municipality of Surčin through canals.

== Sports ==
Local football club Srem has competed one season in the Second League of Serbia and Montenegro, their only season at the second level.

== See also ==
- List of places in Serbia
- List of Belgrade neighbourhoods and suburbs
- Municipality of Surčin
