= Progar =

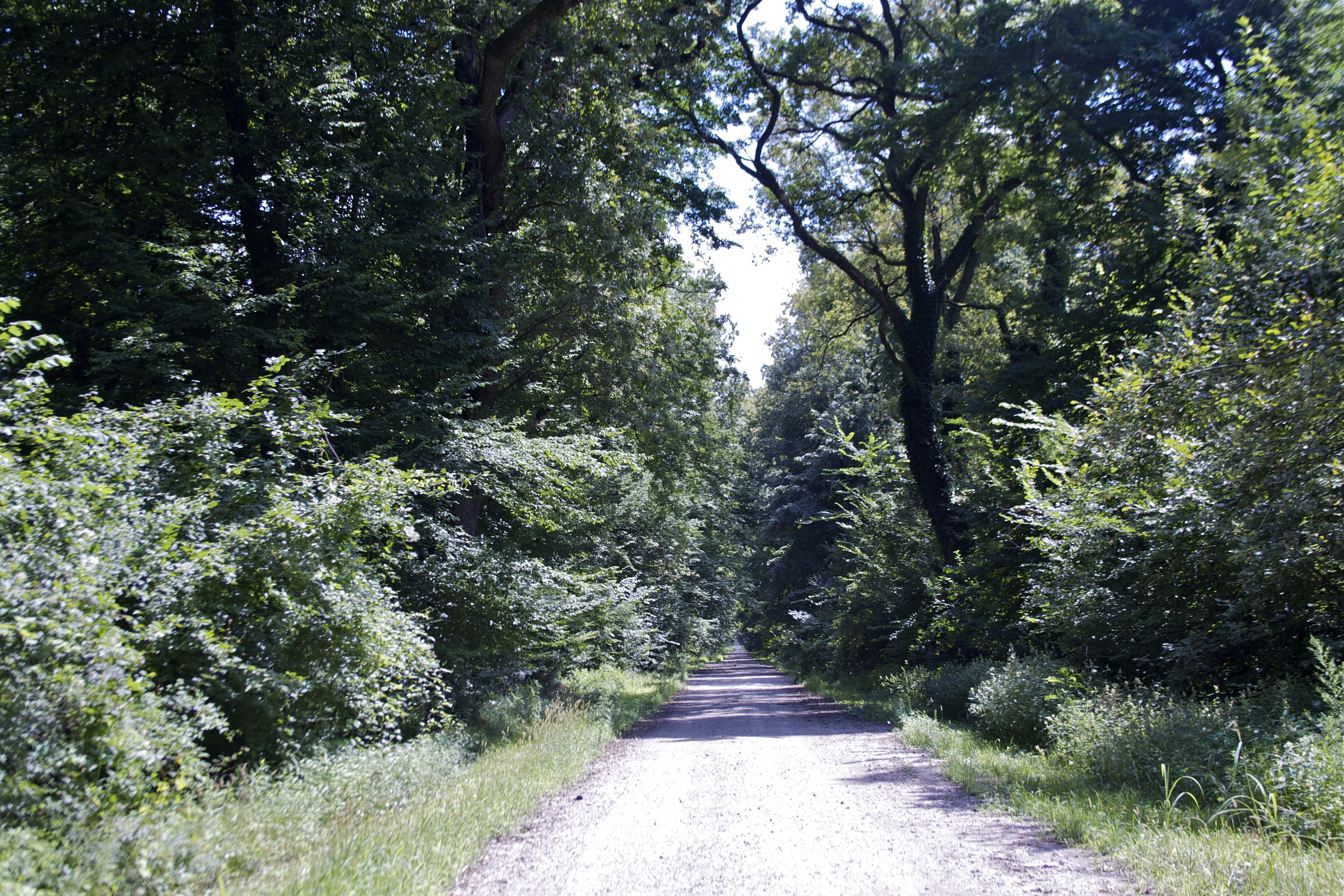
- Forest of Bojčin

- Location within Serbia
- Coordinates: 44°43′N 20°10′E
- Country: Serbia

Area
  - Total: 39.25 km^{2} (15.15 sq mi)

Population (2011)
  - Total: 1,445
  - Density: 36.82/km^{2} (95.35/sq mi)
- Time zone: UTC+1 (CET)
  - Summer (DST): UTC+2 (CEST)

Progar (Serbian Cyrillic: Прогар) is a suburban neighborhood of Belgrade, Serbia. It is located in Belgrade's municipality of Surčin.

== Location ==
Progar is located in Syrmia's sub-region of Podlužje, in southwestern corner of the municipality (Forest of Bojcin) and stretches from the left bank of the Sava at the mouth of the Jarčina canal, to the southern shores of the Živača pond. It is situated 18 km (11 mi) southwest of Surčin, its municipal seat, and 34 km (21 mi) from Belgrade, roughly at Sava's 45 km (28 mi). Local roads connect Progar with the villages of Kupinovo, on the west, and Boljevci, on the east.

Progar also marks the order of the administrative territory of the City of Belgrade in this section. First settlements to the west are Kupinovo and Ašanja, in the Pećinci municipality, in Vojvodina province. On the south, across the Sava, it borders another Belgrade's municipality, Obrenovac.

== Geography ==
The village is located in the fertile, floodplain of the Savа. It is surrounded by the preserved nature vegetation, including the Bojčin Forest, Crni Lug and Jasenska Forest, with combined forested area of 22 km^{2} (8.5 sq mi). The channeled Jarčina stream flows into the Sava at the western corner of the village. The horseshoe-shaped Živača pond is located northeast from Progar, stretching almost to Boljevci. An oxbow lake of Sava, Živača's water level is controlled by the Vok canal.

Progar is roughly triangularly shaped. In 21st century it began to expand to the north, in the direction of the Propadnica field, along the road which swerves around the western and northern shores of Živača, and connect Progar to Boljevci. The village is built in the locality of Rašina Bara, which extends to the west. Šojićeva Greda field locality separates Progar from Živača, while fields Debele Bare, Donje Polje, Dodaci and Duži extend into the south, in the direction of forested Crni Lug region. Along the Sava bank is the island of Progarska Ada. West of it, separated by the Sava's armlets along the embankment which connects the mainland and Progarska Ada, there is another, much smaller island.

The Bojčin Forest, located in the southeastern section of Syrmia, in the Sava valley, is the remnant of the once vast and thick pedunculate oak marshy forests. There are 185 plant species in the forest, of which 15 are under protection or strict protection, and 165 species of fungi (15 protected). There are 10 species of amphibians and reptiles, of which 8 are protected. One third of the entire number of the bird species found in Serbia, 108, can be found in Bojčin.

== History ==
The remains belonging to the Scordisci, a Celtic tribe which founded Singidunum and Taurunum, the predecessors of Belgrade and Zemun, respectively, were found in Progar.

The village was founded in 1521. It was built by the Serbs who escaped from the Ottoman army running across the Sava. They selected the location of the former, by this time completely burned and vacated settlement, and founded Progar on its location. The village was mentioned in the 1546 Ottoman census under the name of Živač. Under its present name, it was mentioned for the first time in 1716, when Austria occupied the area.

After the 1739 Treaty of Belgrade, the Sava became a permanent border between the Ottoman and Austrian empires. This made Progar an outpost within the Austrian Military Frontier. The Serbian Orthodox church dedicated to Saint Archangel Gabirel was built in 1799 and was declared a cultural monument in 1972.

Formerly part of the Zemun municipality, since 2003 it is within the Surčin municipality, after it split from Zemun. In December 2022, municipality announced plans for revitalization of Progar's central section. The plan includes reconstruction and expansion of the "Branko Radičević" elementary school and sports hall, and demolition of the old and construction of the new local dispensary and public, multi-functional venue instead of the local administrative office. The surrounding area, at the moment a regular crossroad, wll be adapted into the square, with new paving, green areas, parking lots and avenues. Works are scheduled to start in 2024.

== Demographics ==
Historical population
Year	Pop.	±%
1948	1,354	—
1953	1,267	−6.4%
1961	1,354	+6.9%
1971	1,239	−8.5%
1981	1,367	+10.3%
1991	1,457	+6.6%
2002	1,455	−0.1%
2011	1,445	−0.7%

Progar is statistically classified as a "rural settlement", or village. It is the second least populated settlement in the municipality, after Petrovčić, with the number of inhabitants being steady and stagnant for decades.

Because of the distance from Belgrade and slow economic development, it is one of the rare settlements in the municipality that doesn't have significant growth of population: 1,457 (1991 census) and 1,455 (2002 census; consisting of Serbs 1,381 (94,91%), Yugoslavs 9 (0,61%) Hungarians 8 (0,54%) and Croats 8 (0,54%).

== Economy ==
The field of Šojićeva Greda is location of the civil Progar Airstrip. It has a grassy, 700 m (2,300 ft) long runway.

By the 2020s, Progar still remained almost exclusively agricultural settlement, despite the numerous opportunities for development of tourism. They include the Bojčin Forest, Živača pond and the neighboring Boljevci fish pond, and river island of Progarska Ada on the Sava. At the bank, across the southernmost tip of the island there is a kayak and canoe club "Marina", which is organizing even some international events.

There is a small beach on the island, the Tarzan Beach (Tarzan plaža). The beach is 40 km (25 mi) southwest from downtown Belgrade. It has no facilities except for the small kafana. The beach got its name because of the vines hanging above the beach, often used by the swimmers to jump into the water, in the Tarzan style.

Summer festival "Bojčin Cultural Summer" (Bojčinsko kulturno leto) is held annually in the Forest of Bojčin. Every weekend, poets, musicians, dancers and theatrical troops perform on an open stage in the woods. In 2011 a permanent exhibition of the sculptures donated by the artists from Serbia, Bulgaria and North Macedonia was set in the forest. A number of hospitality and touristic venues developed by the 2020s in the forest area, in the northern extension of the village. There are other annual events held in the forest, like "Saint Peter's Day Fiacre Parade" (Petrovdanska fijakerijada) and "Equestrian Marathon" (Konjički maraton).
