= Sword of Vengeance (film) =

2014 film by Jim Weedon

- Film poster
- Directed by: Jim Weedon
- Written by: Julian Unthank
- Story by: Matthew Read
- Produced by: Rupert Preston; Huberta Von Liel; Milos Djukelic (co-producer); Allan Niblo; James Richardson; Nigel Williams; Matthew Read (executive producers); Milos Ivosevic; Ivana Panic (line producers)
- Starring: Stanley Weber; Annabelle Wallis; Ed Skrein
- Cinematography: August Jakobsson
- Edited by: Tommy Boulding
- Music by: Stephen Hilton
- Production companies: Vertigo Films; Red Production
- Distributed by: Protagonist Pictures
- Release dates: 10 October 2014 (Sitges); 5 March 2015 (FEST (Belgrade)); 29 May 2015 (United Kingdom)
- Running time: 87 minutes
- Countries: UK, Serbia
- Language: English

Sword of Vengeance (Serbian: Mač osvete) is a 2014 British-Serbian historical action film directed by Jim Weedon, his first feature film, and starring Stanley Weber, Annabelle Wallis, and Ed Skrein. Weedon's action sequences, and the overall look of the film, were inspired by samurai films. While the action sequences and Weber's performance were reasonably well received by critics, most felt the film's dialogue and overall story were subpar, with the caveat that aficionados of the genre would appreciate it far more.

== Synopsis ==
In Northern England, about 1089, some twenty years after the genocidal "Harrowing" (the Harrying of the North ordered by William the Conqueror to quell a series of rebellions), a former slave and Norman princeling has taken the name Shadow Walker (Stanley Weber) upon returning to his father's former lands. There the earl Durant (Karel Roden) rules as a despot with his equally cruel sons Lord Artus (Gianni Giardinelli) and Lord Romain (Edward Akrout).

Shadow Walker makes common cause with and rallies a large band of exiled rebel Anglo-Saxon farmers led by Anna (Annabelle Wallis). Durant is his treacherous uncle, who murdered his own brother and usurped the power of the earldom, his nephew's birthright. One way or another, the question will be decided through battle.

== Cast ==
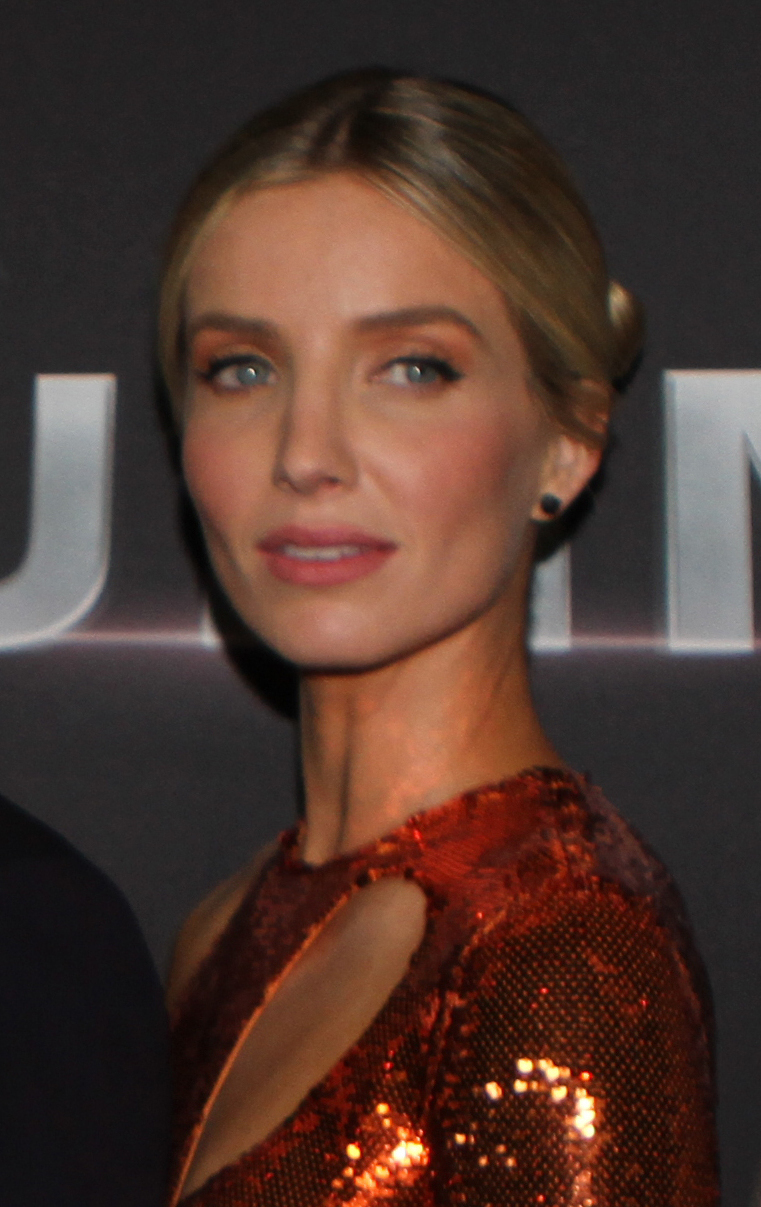
Annabelle Wallis in 2017

- Stanley Weber as Shadow Walker
- Annabelle Wallis as Anna
- Ed Skrein as Treden
- Dave Legeno as Osgar
- Karel Roden as Durant
- Edward Akrout as Romain
- Gianni Giardinelli as Artus
- Peter J. Chaffey as Lucan
- Nenad Pecinar as Kenway
- Milica Jevtic as Udela
- Misa Beric as Marin
- Vid Krkeljic as Wann
- Vahidin Prelic as Pestilence

== Genre and influences ==
Sword of Vengeance is influenced by samurai films and the Hollywood western movies and spaghetti westerns which evolved from them. Director Jim Weedon has been a fan of the chambara style from childhood: "I was intrigued with the idea of creating a medieval world that tonally sat within this style. Immediately we gave the film a very distinct and unexpected look and style." The influence of chambara is particularly evident in the choreography of the sword fights:

Often when watching medieval sword fights they become tedious, clumsy and dull. Whereas the samurai films with their shorter swords lent themselves to... much faster and action orientated aspects in any given fight sequence... I was constantly looking for quick kills, sword slices that were hard and fast for the visual impact and to give us the energy and excitement of the battles as the heroes cut through cipher after cipher.

== Production ==
Sword of Vengeance was produced by Vertigo Films and Red Production, "which has a long tradition of cooperation with foreign productions". Vertigo producer Huberta Von Liel noted that except for a few leading actors, the director, and the director of photography, everyone else involved, about 150 cast and crew, were from Serbia.

=== Background ===
Jim Weedon began his career as a film editor, and was encouraged to try directing by Ridley Scott. While Sword of Vengeance was his first feature film, this was "after cutting his teeth editing music videos and television commercials." He had won awards for his previous work. Weedon was approached by Von Liel, who asked if he would be interested in making a period revenge drama: "I was incredibly interested in the opportunity but also the fact that Vertigo Films allowed me total creative control visually."

=== Writing and characterisation ===
When Julian Unthank joined the project to develop the script, he and Weedon "stripped back the dialogue to a minimum, something that was used a fair amount in the Spaghetti Westerns."

We didn't want the film to fall into the standard cinematic tropes, although the script is a basic premise of revenge we wanted the story to unfold in more unexpected prose, especially the ending. I also wanted our hero to be an antihero, rather than the man that saves the day. His character although conflicted tries to atone for his sins but it comes too late, however, his absolution from Anna in the final scene allows him to find peace and solace from his chosen path of revenge.

=== Design ===
Aesthetically, Weedon went for what he called a "bleach bypass approach" to grading "to achieve very little colour in the film." Wardrobe was designed to be "muted," working with blues, greys and black; "the only real colour coming through is the inherent hues from the fur that the heroes wore." The film's already low colour palette was accentuated by principal photography taking place in winter, as Jennie Kermode notes; everything appears dark, the sky a "miserable grey," and the land "hard and unyielding." Weedon said he wanted the film to "look and smell of the dark ages."

Every aspect of the film from locations to clothing had to look worn, beaten and broken. I had shot some commercials in Serbia and found that they had very talented crew in all departments. Milos Djukelic had just co-produced Ironclad 2 so was ahead in terms of the requirements we needed to create this harsh and foreboding world.

=== Filming and editing ===
Location scouting took place in July 2013. Sword of Vengeance was filmed in thirty days in four locations in Serbia. These were the forest of Bojčinska Šuma, in the Progar area of Belgrade, as well as the fortress in Kalemegdan, Deliblato and Pancevo Reva. Weedon said he lost half a stone (seven pounds) the first four weeks into the shooting schedule, which was five to six days a week, in harsh weather, wading through mud every day, and later it snowed: "days and nights were spent knee deep in mud that at dawn was dangerously frozen ice and by mid morning a muddy mass that was equally harsh." However, the most difficult part was actually the first two days:

Ridiculously we decided to shoot the opening sequence which involved rain fx, horses, stunts, and prosthetics. It was the crew's first two days together, suddenly we are in the rain with actors who can't ride, horses that won't stand still, actors who are going into hyperthermia, and prosthetic limbs that refuse to come apart properly, add in stunts that could only be repeated three to four times, blood that wouldn't squirt sufficiently and the opening crane move into scene that kept breaking down. I did ask myself how the hell did I get into this mess.

Weedon described the editing of the film with Tom Boulding as "incredibly fast".

=== Sound and music ===
With so little dialogue in the film, it fell to the sound designer, Roland Heap, and the composer, Stephen Hilton, to "convey the unsaid." Weedon wanted the audience to have a "musical roller-coaster ride": "Sound is integral to my commercial work and something that always creates the unexpected in the visuals."

== Release and reception ==
The world premiere of Sword of Vengeance took place at the Sitges Film Festival, where it was in competition, on 10 October 2014. It had its Serbian premiere on 5 March 2015 at the Belgrade International Film Festival. The British theatrical release did not follow until 29 May.

=== Home media and streaming ===
Sword of Vengeance has been available on DVD and DVD/Blu-ray (Well Go USA Entertainment, Universal Studios Home Entertainment) and streaming services (Google Play, iTunes, Hulu) since May 2015.

=== Critical response ===
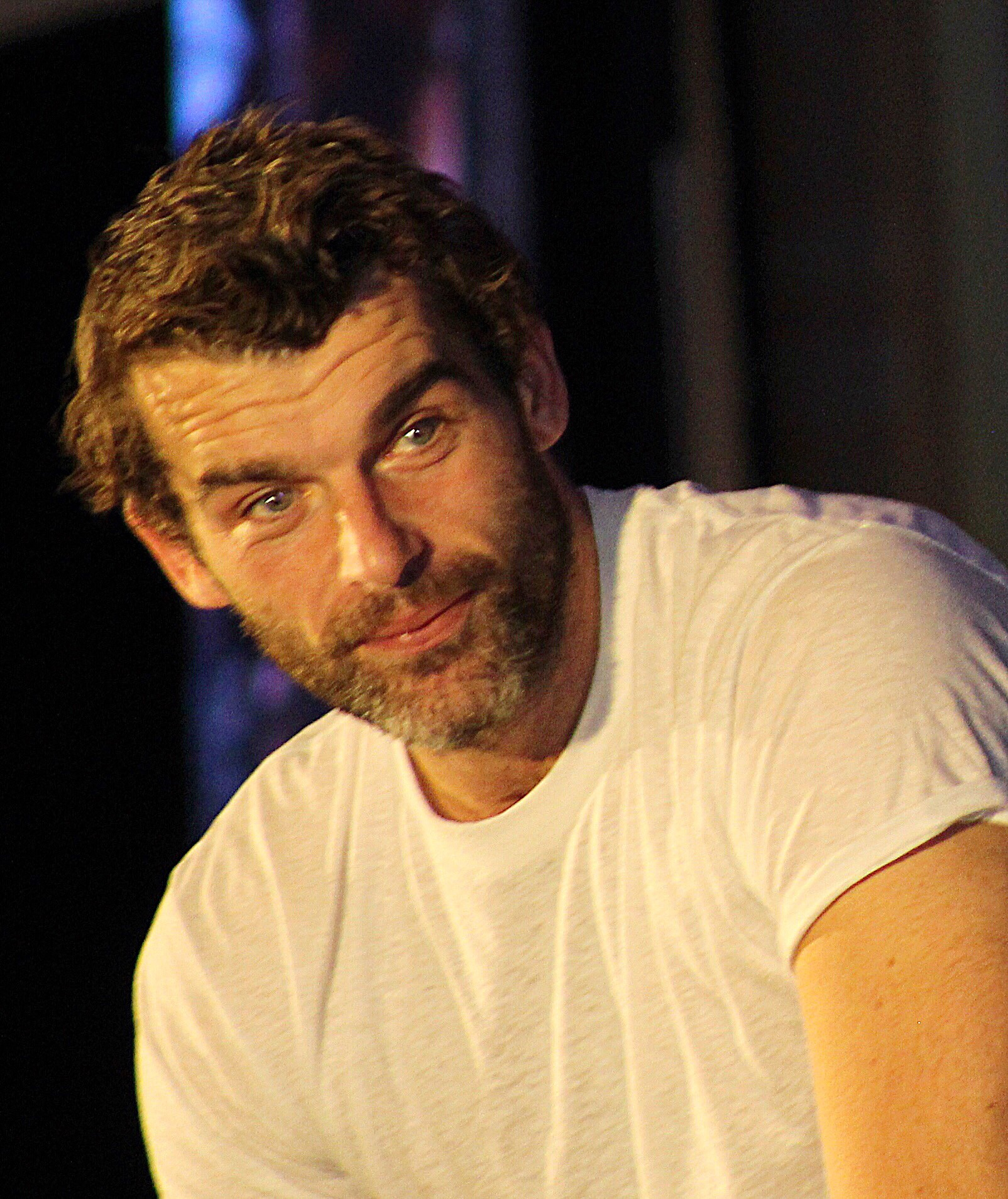
Stanley Weber in 2018

The review aggregator Rotten Tomatoes assigns Sword of Vengeance a rating of 13% based on eight reviews. Critics gave faint to fair praise to the fight scenes, and to Stanley Weber's performance, but found the film wanting otherwise, though acknowledging at the same time that the fighting sequences would be enjoyed by action film fans.

Allan Hunter's review following the world premiere at Sitges set the tone for critics into 2015:

The only things that appear to be lacking is an original story and some decent dialogue... Stanley Weber's Shadow Walker is very much in the Eastwood tradition down to the squint in his eye and the poncho-like garment draped over his strapping shoulders. He is a man with no name but a remarkably good hair stylist to maintain those immaculate cornrows... The plot is pretty basic but served up with some style by Weedon... His vision of England is bleak, oppressive and uniformly monochrome. It sometimes seems as if the only colour in the palette of cinematographer August Jakobsson is the crimson of fresh blood. There is a good deal of blood though as limbs are hacked off, throats are slit and eyes plucked out with merry abandon. Weedon keeps it tight and spare but the real drawbacks are the weary plotting and cheesy dialogue.

Frank Scheck, writing for The Hollywood Reporter, opines that the title "pretty much says it all": there are "enough clanging sword fights, severed limbs, slit throats and bare-bones dialogue to satisfy genre fans while pretty much failing to provide something of interest to anyone else"; the film, while "admirably stylish", has the feel of an 11th-century-set video game. Stanley Weber stands out among the cast, "even managing to make such declarations as "Vengeance is my only belief" sound convincing." Josh Oakley complains that the dialogue is "overwrought and bland, with the actors apparently instructed to take long pauses between each line" and "much of the cast" seem to have accents like Tommy Wiseau's. Ernest Hardy of The Village Voice said the film "hits its mark of being a popcorn action flick just fine."

James Luxford of the Radio Times said there is a "brutal simplicity to the action that will appeal to some," but otherwise, Sword of Vengeance "seems stretched even for a relatively short film." Jennie Kermode assigned the film 2 stars out of 5, saying the fight scenes were uneven but: "Weber's work is carefully choreographed and will please fans of fighting films even if it does sometimes take liberties with physics. This is important because there really isn't much else in the film at all." Geoffrey Macnab of The Independent agreed: "The ritualised action sequences work well enough. It's just a pity the film-makers did not pay as much attention to the plotting as to the design of the movie." Mike McCahill, writing for The Guardian, found the film "perversely watchable" and "modest post-pub fun"; while it is a "low-budget" Game of Thrones "cash-in", it at least improves upon its producers' previous effort, the "risible" Hammer of the Gods.

Critics at Time Out and The Daily Star characterised the film as a "daft" slasher.
