= Gianni Giardinelli =

French actor

- Born: 28 August 1979 (age 45); Paris, France
- Occupation(s): Actor, model
- Years active: 1991–present

Gianni Giardinelli is a French actor and model.

== Filmography ==
Year	Title	Role	Director	Notes
1991	Génial, mes parents divorcent !	Christian	Patrick Braoudé	
1991	Les Z'invincibles	Guillaume / Mathieu	Gérard Espinasse, Pascal Mourier, ...	TV series (9 episodes)
1993	Prat et Harris		Boramy Tioulong	TV movie
1997	Bouge !	The young seller	Jérôme Cornuau	
1997	Le grand Batre		Laurent Carcélès	TV movie
1997	Julie Lescaut	Teddy	Alain Wermus	TV series (1 episode)
1997	L'histoire du samedi	Bruno Racine	Christiane Spiero	TV series (1 episode)
1998	Un père en plus	Stan	Didier Albert	TV movie
1998	Un père inattendu		Alain Bonnot	TV movie
1999	Hygiène de l'assassin	Young Prétextat Tach	François Ruggieri	
1999	Les Monos	Bastien	José Pinheiro	TV series (1 episode)
1999-2005	Manatea, les perles du Pacifique	Julien	Hervé Renoh, Hugues de Laugardière, ...	TV series (10 episodes)
2000	Louis Page	Christophe	Hugues de Laugardière	TV series (1 episode)
2000	Le g.R.E.C.	Nicolas	Pat Le Guen-Tenot	TV series (1 episode)
2001	15 August	Julie's boyfriend	Patrick Alessandrin	
2002-2003	La vie devant nous	Stanislas de Courbel	Vincenzo Marano, Alain Choquart, ...	TV series (52 episodes)
2003	La faucheuse	Marc	Vincenzo Marano & Patrick Timsit	Short
2003	Malone	Martin	Franck Apprederis	TV series (1 episode)
2003	Central nuit	Guillaume	Didier Delaître	TV series (1 episode)
2004	Premiers secours	Philippe Lebois	Didier Delaître	TV series (1 episode)
2005	Le juge	Luc Quintana	Vincenzo Marano	TV mini-series
2005	Navarro	Mathieu Gagnon	Patrick Jamain	TV series (1 episode)
2006	Murderers	Yann Jobert	Patrick Grandperret	
2006	Laura, le compte à rebours a commencé	Bazin	Jean-Teddy Filippe	TV mini-series
2006	Section de recherches	Manuel Diaz	Vincenzo Marano	TV series (1 episode)
2007	La surprise	Luc	Alain Tasma	TV movie
2008	Cortex	Ludo	Nicolas Boukhrief	
2008	Des poupées et des anges	Alex	Nora Hamdi	
2008	X Femmes	Man in green room	Mélanie Laurent	TV series (1 episode)
2008	Les tricheurs	Jérémy	Laurent Carcélès	TV series (1 episode)
2009	Cas ID	The hyena	Matthieu Tribes	Short
2009	De bon matin	Karim	Xavier Mauranne	Short
2009	Les corbeaux	Yannick	Régis Musset	TV movie
2009	Section de recherches	Paul Fontaine	Olivier Barma	TV series (1 episode)
2010	Coursier	Ice	Hervé Renoh	
2010	Mafiosa	Nico	Hugues Pagan & Éric Rochant	TV series (1 episode)
2011	Halal police d'État	Skin 1	Rachid Dhibou	
2011	Interpol	Mickaël	Bruno Garcia	TV series (1 episode)
2012	Enquêtes réservées	Clément Morin	Bénédicte Delmas	TV series (1 episode)
2012	Des soucis et des hommes	Sarfati	Christophe Barraud	TV series (5 episodes)
2013	Chat	Joggeur	Ilan Cohen	Short
2013	Cleopatra ya Lalla	Cesar	Hicham Hajji	Short
2014	May Allah Bless France!	The gangster	Abd al Malik	
2014	Un mort sur le trottoir	The physiotherapist	David Dargaud	Short
2015	Sword of Vengeance	Artus	Jim Weedon	
2015	Falco	Cédric	Julien Despaux, Marwen Abdallah, ...	TV series (3 episodes)
2016	WorkinGirls	A patient	Sylvain Fusée	TV series (1 episode)
2016	Le juge est une femme	Ulrich Tadault	Akim Isker	TV series (1 episode)
2017	The New Adventures of Cinderella	Angry Dwarf	Lionel Steketee	
2017	Coup de Foudre à Noël	Antoine	Arnauld Mercadier	TV movie
2017	Caïn	François Letter	Bertrand Arthuys	TV series (1 episode)
2018	Tomorrow Is Ours	Patrick	Christophe Barraud, Octave Raspail, ...	TV series (17 episodes); Soap Awards France - Best Villain
2018-2019	Cut	Solal	François Bigrat, David Hourrègue, ...	TV series (23 episodes)
