= Stanley Weber =

French actor and theatre director (born 1986)

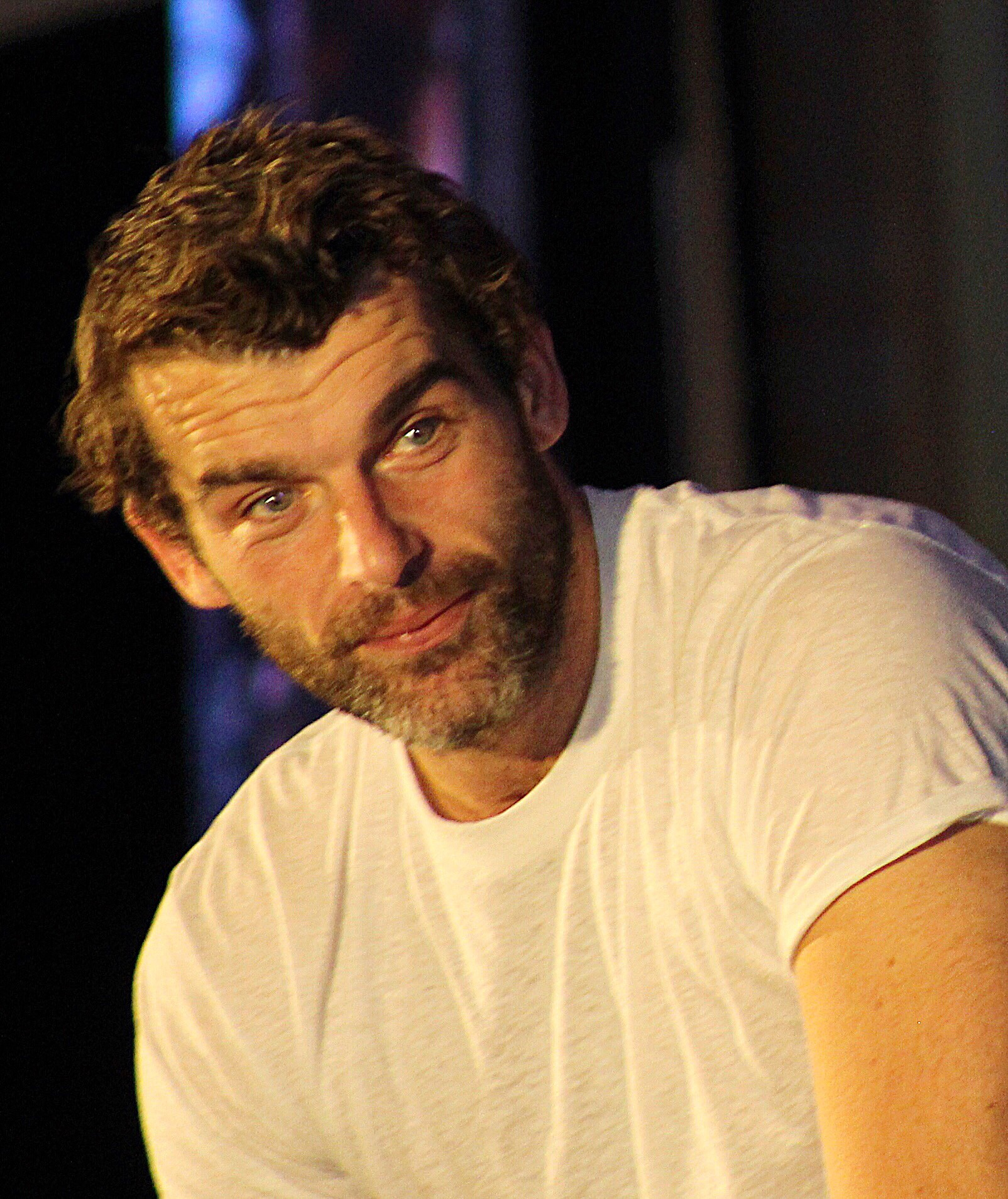
- Weber in 2018
- Born: Stanley Weber; 13 July 1986 (age 40); Paris, France
- Education: Cours Florent; Conservatoire national supérieur d'art dramatique London Academy of Music and Dramatic Art
- Occupations: Actor, theatre director
- Years active: 2005–present
- Parent(s): Jacques Weber; Christine Weber

Stanley Weber (born 13 July 1986) is a French actor and theatre director. He is known for his performance as Juan Borgia in the television series Borgia, and for his roles in films The First Day of the Rest of Your Life and Thérèse Desqueyroux as well as Violette.

== Early life and education ==
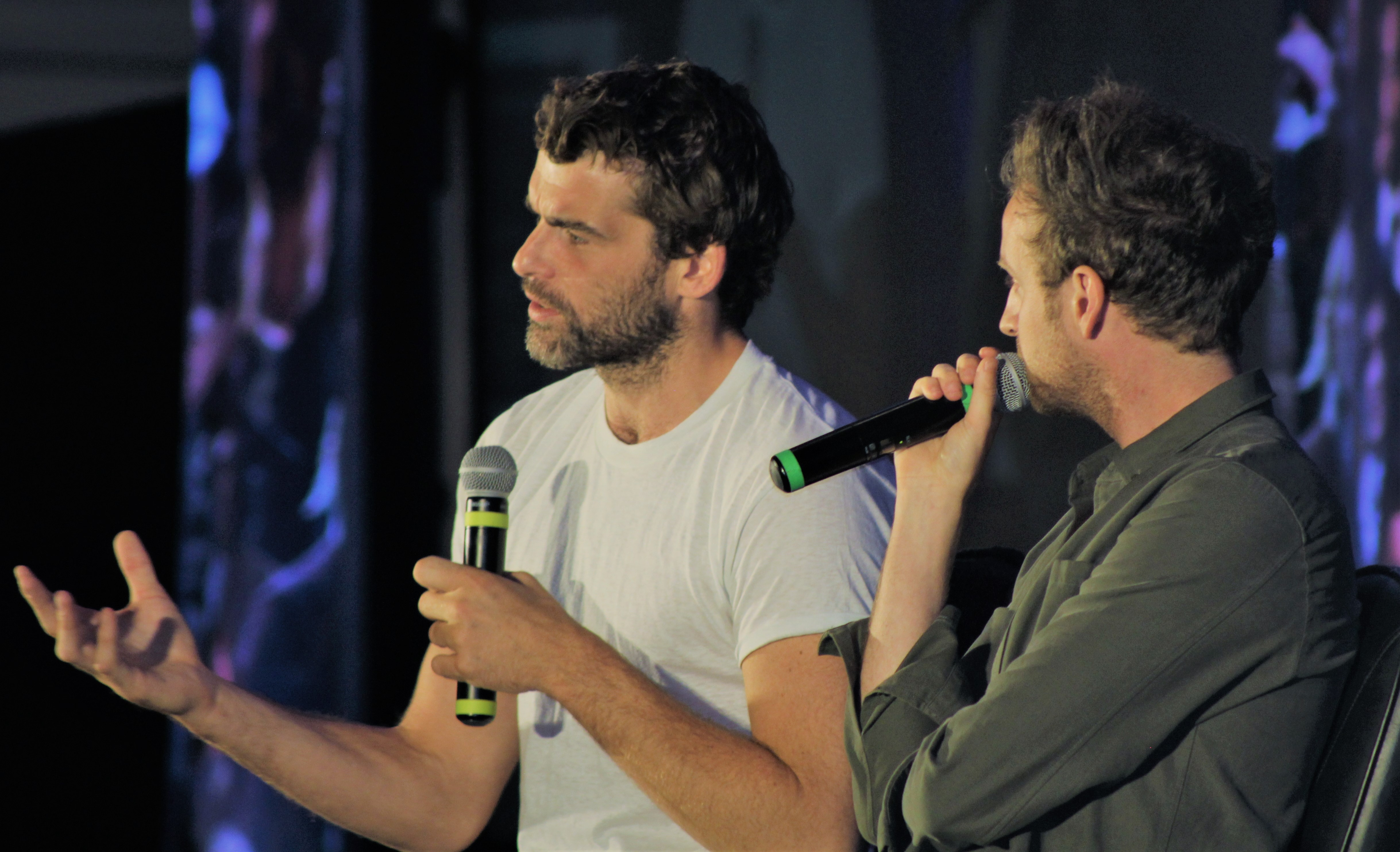
Stanley Weber (L) and Andrew Gower (R) answer questions during their panel at Creation Entertainment's Outlander convention in Las Vegas on 15 July 2018.

Stanley Weber was born on 13 July 1986 in Paris, France, to actor Jacques Weber and his wife Christine. He has a sister, Kim, and a brother, Tommy.

Weber received his first acting lessons at Cours Florent, and then enrolled acting at the Conservatoire national supérieur d'art dramatique. He also studied at the London Academy of Music and Dramatic Art.

== Theatre ==
Year	Title	Author	Director
2005	Le Mal à dire	Léon Masson	Léon Masson
2006	Richard Ier Cœur de Lion	Vytas Kraujelis	Vytas Kraujelis
2007	La Nuit s'est abattue comme une vache	Léon Masson	Léon Masson
2007	Si ce n'est toi	Charles Petit	Charles Petit
2008	Macbeth	William Shakespeare	Katharina Stegemann
2008	Scarecrow	Garry Michael White	Pierre Giafferi & Stanley Weber
2008	Le Chevalier de la lune	Stanley Weber	Pierre Giafferi & Stanley Weber
2008	Comment prendre 5 ans en l'espace de 2 h d'avion ?	Stanley Weber	Stanley Weber
2009	César, Fanny, Marius	Marcel Pagnol	Francis Huster
2010	Macbeth	William Shakespeare	John Baxter
2010	Much Ado About Nothing	William Shakespeare	Stephen Jameson
2012–13	L'Épreuve	Pierre de Marivaux	Clément Hervieu-Léger
2015	Anna Christie	Eugene O'Neill	Jean-Louis Martinelli
2017	Le Pays Lointain	Jean-Luc Lagarce	Clément Hervieu-Léger

== Filmography ==
Year	Title	Role	Director	Notes
2006	Mauvaise Prise	The Man	Benoît Jeannot	Short film
2007	À l'hôtel elle alla, elle le tu là	He	Eponine Momenceau	Short film
2007	Tim	Tim	Jacques Girault	Short film
2007	Le vrai coupable		Francis Huster	Television film
2008	The First Day of the Rest of Your Life	Éric	Rémi Bezançon	
2008	Figaro	Chérubin	Jacques Weber	Television film
2008	La dame de Monsoreau	Capitaine Delmas	Michel Hassan	Television film
2009	Qu'est-ce qu'on fait ?	The Man	André Cavaillé	Short film
2009	Louis XV, le soleil noir	Louis XV	Thierry Binisti	Television film
2009	Juste un peu d'@mour	Marc	Nicolas Herdt	Television film
2010	Pieds nus sur les limaces		Fabienne Berthaud	
2010	Agatha Christie's Poirot	Count Andrenyi	Philip Martin	Episode: "Murder on the Orient Express"
2010	Any Human Heart	Swiss Detective	Michael Samuels	1 episode
2011–14	Borgia	Juan & Francesco Borgia	Several	Recurring role, 14 episodes
2012	Thérèse Desqueyroux	Jean Azevedo	Claude Miller	
2012	La banda Picasso	Georges Braque	Fernando Colomo	
2012	The Hollow Crown	Duke of Orléans	Thea Sharrock	Episode: "Henry V"
2013	Not Another Happy Ending	Tom Duvall	John McKay	
2013	Trap for Cinderella	Serge	Iain Softley	
2013	Violette	The young mason	Martin Provost	
2013	Cheba Louisa	Fred	Françoise Charpiat	
2013	Le maillot de bain	Stéphane	Mathilde Bayle	Short film
2013	Aurélia		Jade Courtney Edwards	Short film
2014	French Women	James Gordon	Audrey Dana	
2014	La clinique du docteur Blanche	Emile Blanche	Sarah Lévy	Television film
2015	Sword of Vengeance	Shadow Walker	Jim Weedon	
2015	Quand je ne dors pas	Jérôme	Tommy Weber	
2016	The Origin of Violence	Nathan Wagner	Élie Chouraqui	
2016	Paula	Georges	Christian Schwochow	
2016	Outlander	Count of St. Germain	Metin Hüseyin & Douglas Mackinnon	6 Episodes
2017	Pilgrimage	Brother Geraldus	Brendan Muldowney	
2017	Let Me Go	Serge	Polly Steele	Bentonville Film Festival - Best Ensemble
2018	Two Black Coffees	The Boss	Michael Driscoll	Short film
2018	La sainte famille	Charles	Marion Sarraut	Television film
2018	Britannia	Lindon	Sheree Folkson, Susan Tully, ...	Recurring role, 10 episodes
2019	Berlin Station	Leo Morillon	Christoph Schrewe & Tanya Hamilton	2 episodes
2019	Le temps est assassin	Natale Angeli	Claude-Michel Rome	Lead role, 11 episodes
2019	Noces d'Or	Fabrice Saint-Cast	Nader T. Homayoun	Television film
2022	L'île aux 30 cercueils	Stéphane Maroux	Frédéric Mermoud	
2023	Drops of God (Les Gouttes de Dieu)	Alexandre Léger	Oded Ruskin	8 episodes
2024	Monsieur Spade	Jean-Pierre Devereaux	Scott Frank	Main role
2025	Black Mirror	Claude	Haolu Wang	Episode: "Hotel Reverie"
