= Murderers (film) =

2006 film

- Film poster
- French: Meurtrières
- Directed by: Patrick Grandperret
- Written by: Patrick Grandperret; Frédérique Moreau
- Produced by: Patrick Grandperret
- Starring: Hande Kodja; Céline Sallette
- Cinematography: Pascal Caubère
- Edited by: Dominique Galliéni
- Distributed by: Pan Européenne Distribution
- Release date: 28 June 2006
- Running time: 101 minutes
- Country: France
- Language: French

Murderers (French: Meurtrières) is a 2006 French drama film directed by Patrick Grandperret. It was screened in the Un Certain Regard section at the 2006 Cannes Film Festival.

== Cast ==
- Hande Kodja as Nina
- Céline Sallette as Lizzy
- Gianni Giardinelli as Yann Jobert
- Anaïs de Courson as Hélène Jobert
- Isabelle Caubère as Madame Jobert
- Shafik Ahmad as Malik
- Karine Pinoteau as Joanna
- Marc Rioufol as Le père de Nina
- Eugène Durif as Le psychiatre
