= Radiofar =

Neighborhood in Belgrade, Serbia

Radiofar (Serbian Cyrillic: Радиофар) is a suburban neighborhood of Belgrade, the capital of Serbia. It is located in the Belgrade's municipality of Surčin.

Radiofar, actually a sub-neighborhood of Surčin, is a settlement near the Belgrade's Nikola Tesla Airport, 10 km west of downtown Belgrade. It is located in the vicinity the Belgrade-Zagreb highway, close to the airport's control tower. This is how the settlement got its name ('radiofar' = aerodrome beacon).

Settlement began to develop in the late 1980s as the weekend-settlement, but grew with an influx of refugees as the result of the Yugoslav Wars from 1991. Estimated population by 2011 was over 3,000.
