= 15 August (2001 film) =

2001 film by Patrick Alessandrin

- Theatrical release poster
- Directed by: Patrick Alessandrin
- Written by: Lisa Alessandrin
- Produced by: Luc Besson; Bernard Grenet
- Starring: Richard Berry; Charles Berling; Jean-Pierre Darroussin
- Cinematography: Damien Morisot
- Edited by: Yann Malcor
- Distributed by: EuropaCorp Distribution
- Release date: 18 April 2001
- Running time: 90 minutes
- Country: France
- Language: French
- Budget: $7.5 million
- Box office: $10.2 million

15 August (French: 15 Août) is a 2001 French film directed and written by Patrick Alessandrin.

== Plot ==
Some middle aged men quickly have a crisis on their hands when their wives depart leaving them to look after the boisterous kids.

== Cast ==
- Richard Berry as Max
- Charles Berling as Vincent
- Jean-Pierre Darroussin as Raoul
- Mélanie Thierry as Julie
- Selma El Mouissi as Nina, Max's daughter
- Manon Gaurin as Alice, Max's daughter
- Quentin Pommier as Arnold, Vincent's son
- Thomas Goulard as Sébastien, Vincent's son
- Ludmila Mikaël as Louise Abel
- Blandine Bury as Stéphanie
- Annette Merchandou as Madame André
- Marie-Christine Demares as Madame Michaud
- Jean-François Gallotte as Fabrice
- Serge Hazanavicius as Loïc
- Catherine Hosmalin as neighbour
- Dimitri Radochevitch as neighbour
- Luc Sonzogni as swimming monitor
- Gianni Giardinelli as Julie's boyfriend
