= Patrick Grandperret =

French film director (1946–2019)

- Born: 24 October 1946
- Died: 9 March 2019 (aged 72)
- Occupations: Film director, screenwriter, film producer
- Years active: 1981–2019

Patrick Grandperret (24 October 1946 – 9 March 2019) was a French film director, screenwriter and producer. His film Murderers was screened in the Un Certain Regard section at the 2006 Cannes Film Festival.

== Filmography ==
Year	Title	Role	Notes
1981	Short Circuit (Court circuit)		Director
1989	Mona and I (Mona et moi)		Director
1993	The Lion Child (L'Enfant Lion)		Director
1993	Forced to Be with Others (De force avec d'autres)	Le psychanaliste	
1994	I Can't Sleep	Abel	
1995	The Elephant Master (Le Maître des éléphants)		Director
1996	The Victims (Les victimes)		Director
1999	Beau travail		
2002	Mischka	Le père de Jane	(final film role)
2006	Murderers		Director
