= Petrovčić =

- Suburban settlement
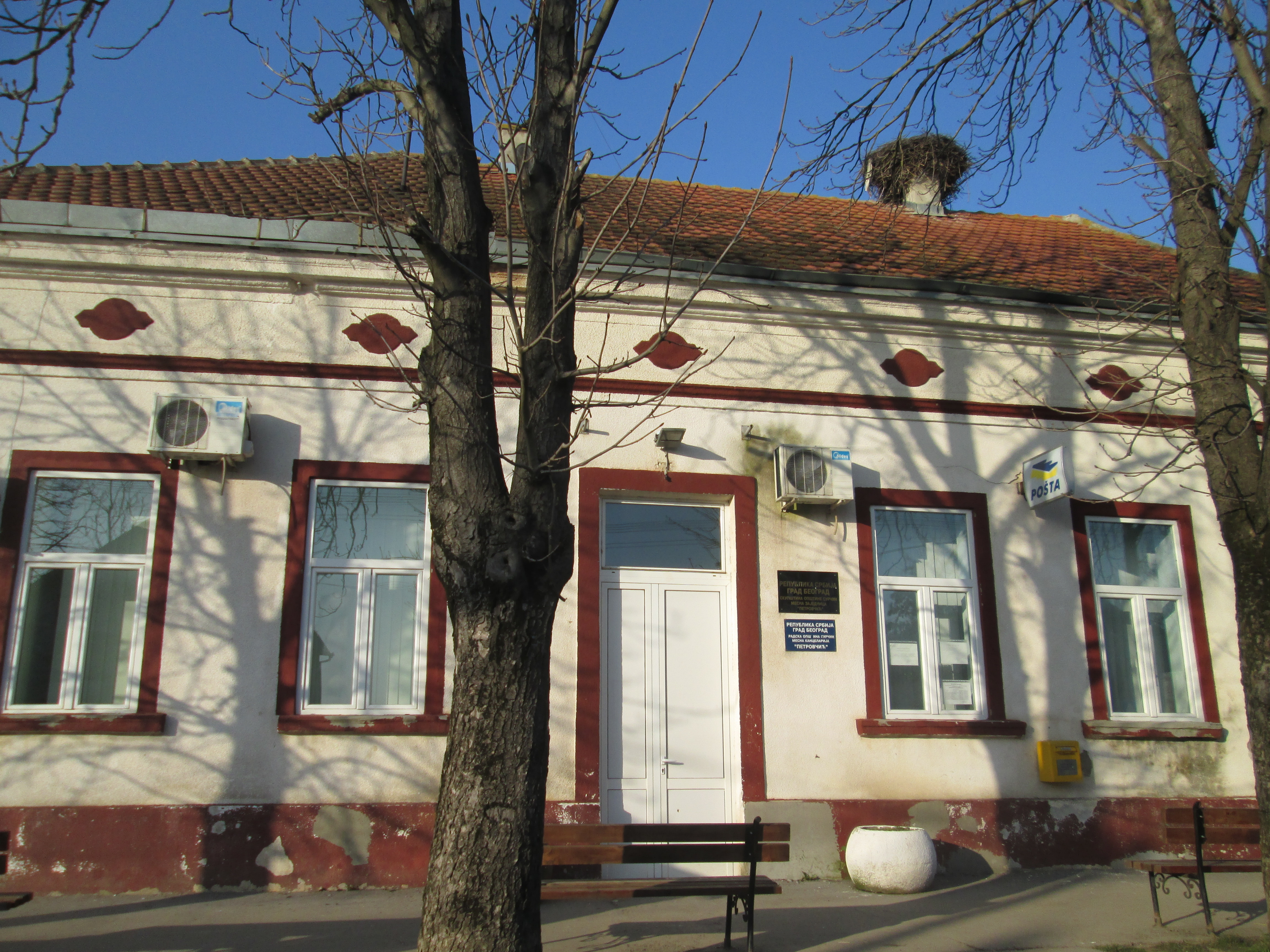
- Petrovčić
- Interactive map of Petrovčić
- Location within Serbia
- Coordinates: 44°47′36″N 20°08′40″E
- Country: Serbia

Area
  - Total: 20.15 km^{2} (7.78 sq mi)

Population (2011)
  - Total: 1,394
  - Density: 69.18/km^{2} (179.2/sq mi)
- Time zone: UTC+1 (CET)
  - Summer (DST): UTC+2 (CEST)

Petrovčić (Serbian Cyrillic: Петровчић) is a suburban settlement of Belgrade, Serbia. It is located in Belgrade's municipality of Surčin.

== Location ==
Petrovčić is the westernmost settlement in the municipality, located right next to the administrative border which divides Central Serbia and the province of Vojvodina. It is located in the Syrmia region (north of the Bojčinska woods), west of the village of Bečmen, almost 30 kilometers west of downtown Belgrade and 12 kilometers west of its municipal seat, Surčin.

The road which connects Petrovčić to Surčin (through Bečmen) on the east, continues into the Vojvodina on the west, to the village of Karlovčić. A crossroad of this road and the one opposite to it (north to south, Deč-Ašanja) is just west of Petrovčić.

== Demographics ==
Historical population
Year	Pop.	±%
1948	751	—
1953	811	+8.0%
1961	846	+4.3%
1971	890	+5.2%
1981	956	+7.4%
1991	1,117	+16.8%
2002	1,406	+25.9%
2011	1,394	−0.9%

Like majority of the settlements in the municipality, Petrovčić experienced steady population growth for decades, especially from the 1990s, almost 26% between the censuses of 1991 (1,117 inhabitants) and 2002 (1,406), but it depopulated by the 2011 census to 1,394. Major ethnic groups are the Serbs (1,261 or 89,69%), Romani (73 or 5,19%), Montenegrins and Gorani (17 each or 1,21%). people

== Characteristics ==
The settlement is statistically classified as a rural one (village). It has a junior grades elementary school and a poetry festival “Stihovi pod vedrim nebom” (Verses under the open skies).

== Economy ==
Urban agriculture is today predominant, including breeding of the mangalica pigs. Previously, the village was known for the cultivation of the mulberry trees.
