= Bečmen =

Suburban settlement of Belgrade, Serbia

Coordinates: 44°47′N 20°13′E

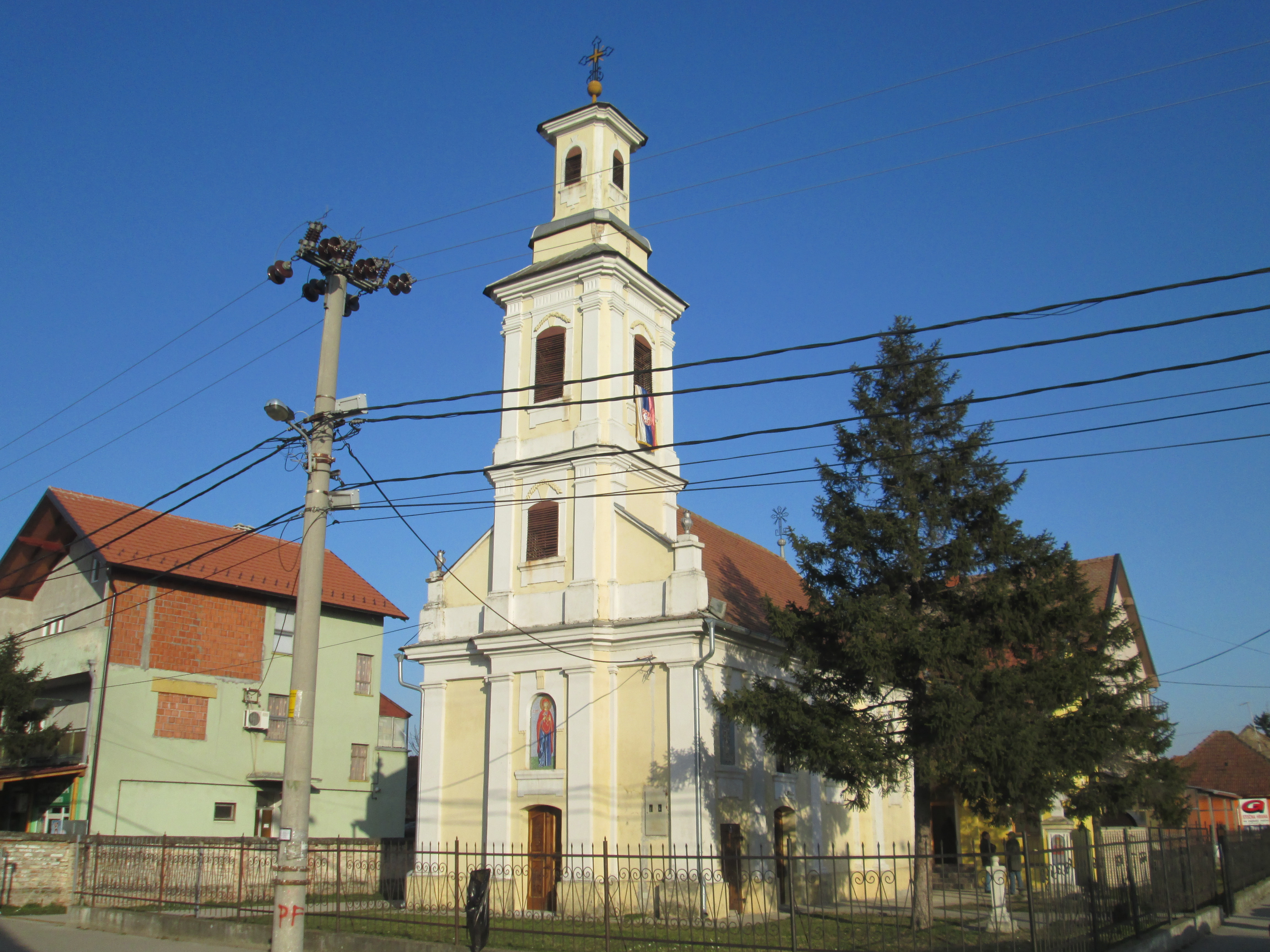
Bečmen

Bečmen (Serbian Cyrillic: Бечмен) is a suburban settlement of Belgrade, Serbia. It is located in Belgrade's municipality of Surčin.

== Location ==
Bečmen is located in the western-central part of the municipality, in the Syrmia region (sub-region of Podlužje, north of the Bojčinska woods), 6 kilometers west of its municipal seat, Surčin, and some 25 kilometers west of downtown Belgrade. It is located on the road which connects Petrovčić on the west to Surčin on the east, and continues to the west into the province of Vojvodina (the village of Karlovčić).

== History ==
From the 19th century, when the area was part of Austria-Hungary, it was populated by the German settles from Bavaria, which emigrated after World War II and the village was colonized with the settlers from the central Serbia. That is why the village's football club is called „Šumadinac“, after Šumadija, region of central Serbia. Bečmen was known for the vast number of big mulberry trees, which spread all the way to the neighboring Petrovčić, and for the vineyards.

== Population ==
Historical population
Year	Pop.	±%
1921	868	—
1931	974	+12.2%
1948	733	−24.7%
1953	974	+32.9%
1961	1,195	+22.7%
1971	1,357	+13.6%
1981	2,494	+83.8%
1991	2,951	+18.3%
2002	3,409	+15.5%
2011	3,785	+11.0%
2022	4,006	+5.8%

Bečmen is statistically classified as a rural settlement (village), and it had a steady population growth in the past century, except for the immediate period after World War II, due to the immigration of the German population. According to the latest Serbian census of population, Bečmen had a population of 3,785.

Major ethnic groups by the 2002 census were the Serbs (3,214 or 94.28%), Romani (60 or 1.76%), Montenegrins (21 or 0.61%) and Macedonians (19 or 0.55%).

== Ključ ==
A hamlet of Bečmen, named after the shape of the settlement (Serbian ključ, the key).

== Tourism ==
=== Bečmen Pond ===
Bečmen Pond (Bečmenska bara) or Bečmen Lake (Bečmensko jezero) is a complex of three fish pond lakes directly adjacent to the central part of the village. Total length of the lakes is 5.5 km (3.4 mi). They are rich in carp, Prussian carp, pike, zander, grass carp, silver carp and catfish. Apart from fishing, the water skiing is organized. International competition has been held annually since 2013. The pond is one of four small lakes interconnected by the channeled Galovica stream, and all also serve as fish ponds. In 2022, two marinas were built on the pond. Swans live in the lake.

=== Oaza sports complex ===
Area of Bečmen has been chosen as a location of the future largest golf courses in the Balkans, which is with the projected value of €800 million in the next 11 years one of the largest foreign investments in Serbia. It is projected that in the next six years a large course with 18 holes and two smaller ones with 9 holes will be built, while the entire complex on 300 ha (740 acres) will be finished in 11 years and also include ambulance, open kindergarten, five star hotel complex, golf club, service buildings, business center, residential complex with 5,000 apartments but also a cricket field, basketball, tennis, volleyball and handball courts, bowling alley and bocce court. An artificial lake which will separate the courses from the residential area will be also created. The entire "Oaza" (oasis) complex will be encircled with 20 ha (49 acres) of woods and pedestrian and bicycle paths which will connect it to the left bank of the Sava river. "Oaza" will be 25 km (16 mi) away from Belgrade and its construction will include a new 20 km (12 mi) long access road from Dobanovci.

However, nothing has been done in those next 11 years, and in September 2019 the US-Austrian-Israeli consortium behind the project announced that only now the ownership problems with the land were solved, that drafting of the detailed regulatory plan begins and that works will start in 2020, starting with the large, 18 holes course.
