= Surčin =

Surčin Сурчин (Serbian)
- Municipality
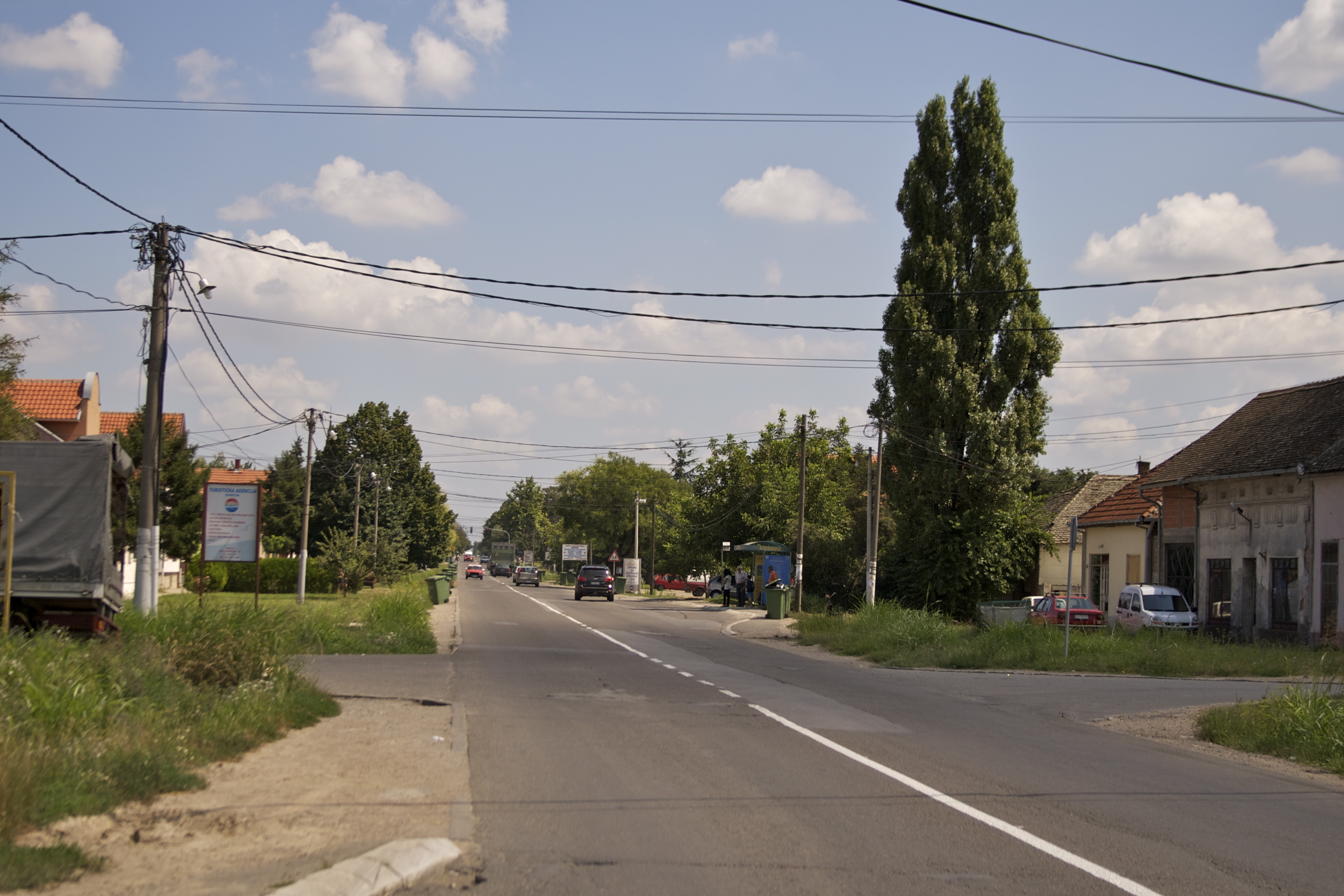

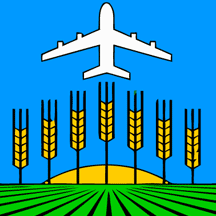
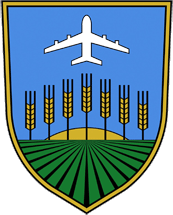
- Flag Coat of arms

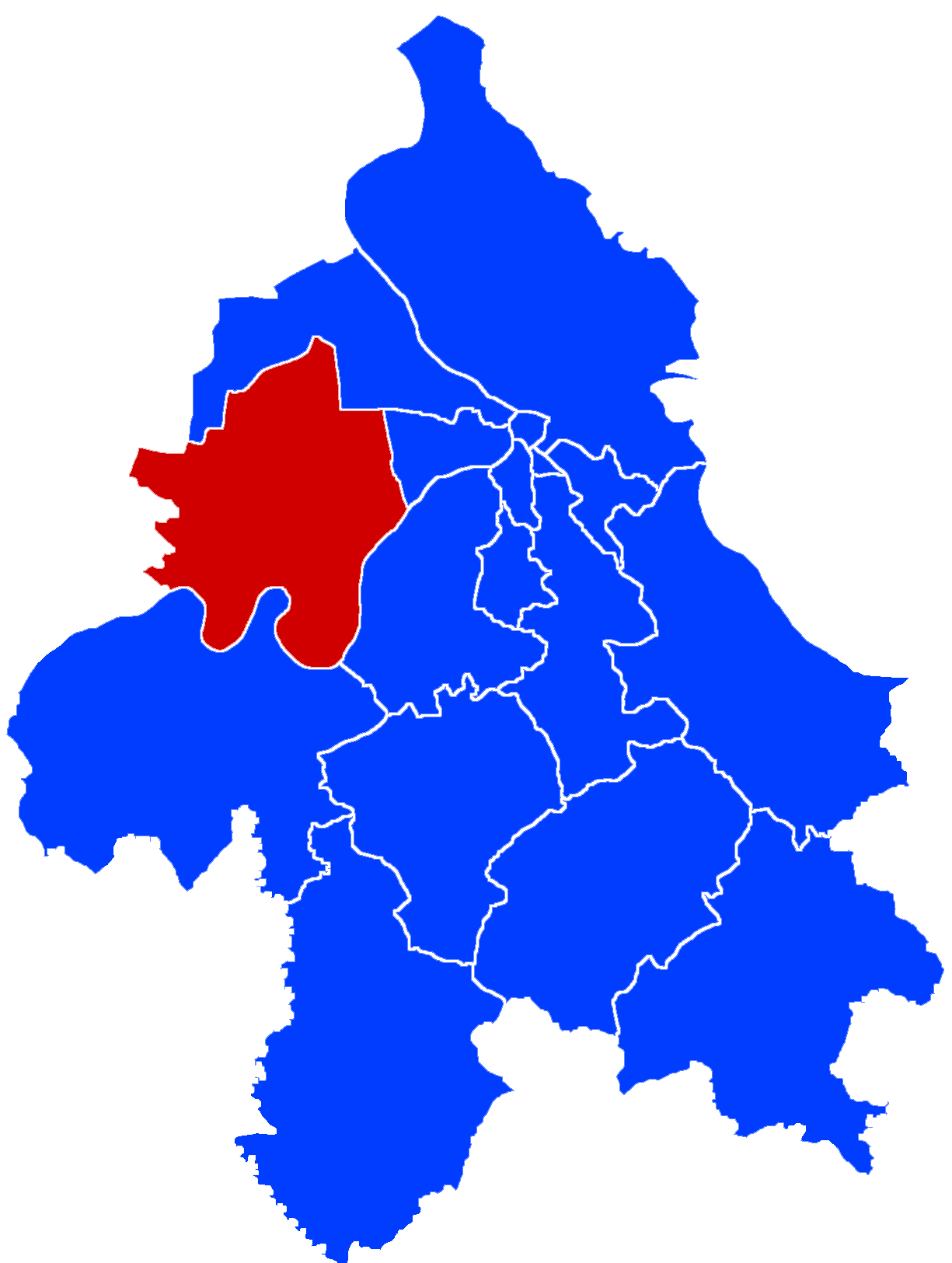
- Location of Surčin within the city of Belgrade
- Coordinates: 44°47′31″N 20°16′20.2″E
- Country: Serbia
- City: Belgrade
- Municipality status: 2003
- Settlements: 7

Government
  - Mayor: Miloš Dangubić (SNS)

Area
  - Urban: 61.21 km^{2} (23.63 sq mi)
  - Municipality: 288.48 km^{2} (111.38 sq mi)

Population (2022 census)
  - Municipality: 45,452
  - Municipality density: 157.56/km^{2} (408.07/sq mi)
- Time zone: UTC+1 (CET)
  - Summer (DST): UTC+2 (CEST)
- Postal code: 11271
- Area code: +381 11
- Car plates: BG
- Website: www.surcin.rs

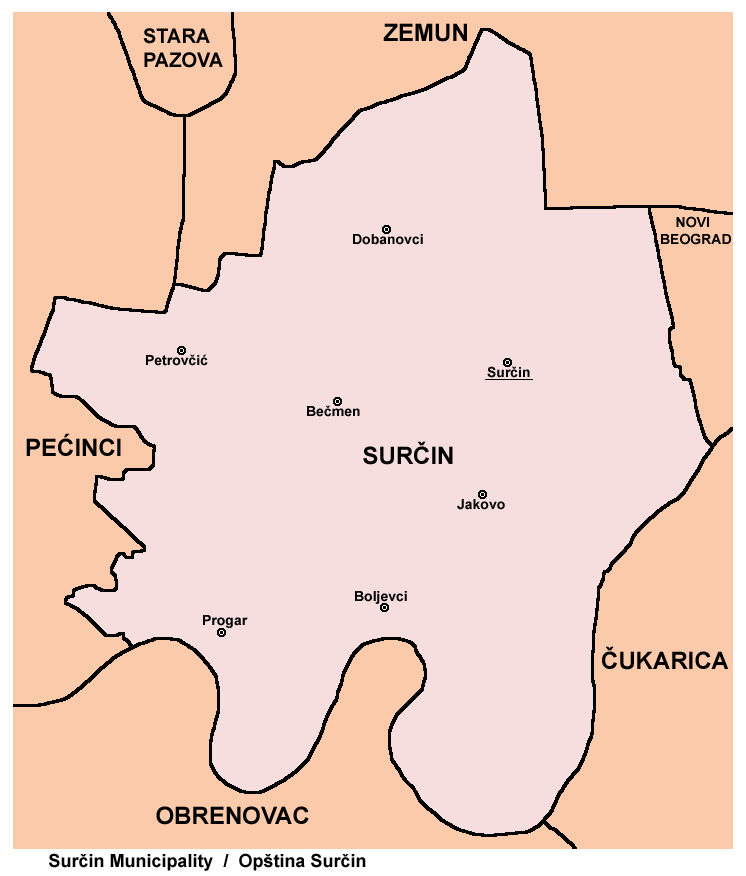
Map of Surčin municipality

Surčin (Serbian Cyrillic: Сурчин, pronounced [sǔrt͡ʃiːn]) is a municipality of the city of Belgrade. It is located in the eastern Syrmia region in Central Europe, 32km west of downtown Belgrade. As of 2022 census, it has a population of 45,452 inhabitants.

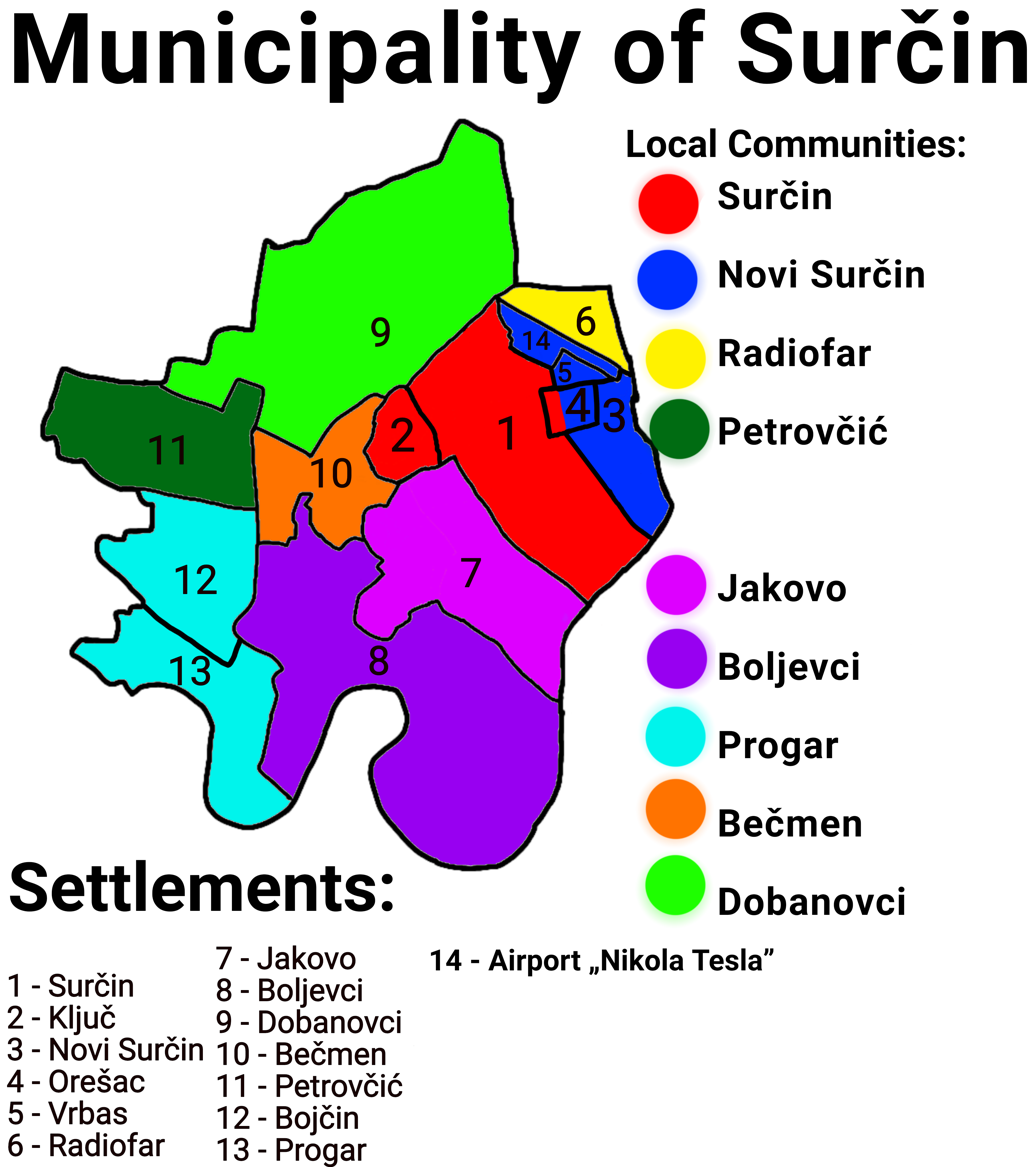
Map of Municipality of Surčin

It is the newest municipality of Belgrade, having split from the municipality of Zemun in 2003. Its most important feature is the Belgrade Nikola Tesla Airport, located just a few kilometers west of the town. This municipality is a suburb of Belgrade.

== History ==
The area of the town has been settled since prehistoric times, and archaeological findings from ancient eras are common. So far, it is established that previous settlements existed in the Stone Age, Neolithic, Bronze Age, and Roman era.

From 1991 to 2002, the population of the municipality grew from 35,591 to 38,695. Most of that growth came from the refugees from the Yugoslav Wars (mostly Croatia and Bosnia and Herzegovina). Since many of the refugees were integrated into the Serbian citizenship after 2002, it is to be expected that the official population has grown significantly.

Surčin was the seat of its own municipality until 1965 when it was annexed to the municipality of Zemun (prior to that, municipalities of Boljevci and Dobanovci were annexed to the municipality of Surčin). A movement for splitting from Zemun has been very vocal since the 1990s and though it did not fulfil some of the conditions required by the Belgrade City statute for creation of a new municipality (mainly, a population of over 50,000), Belgrade City assembly voted to detach Surčin from Zemun officially on 24 November 2003. The newly-formed municipality remained under the administration of the municipality of Zemun until the next municipal elections and finally got its own administration on 3 November 2004. However, municipal administration and the overall political situation in Surčin has been highly unstable ever since.

As the town was growing, a new neighborhood called New Surčin (Novi Surčin) developed to the east, making urban connection to Ledine, the westernmost extension of New Belgrade's urban tissue. Construction of the new church, at the corner of Vojvođanska and Matice Srpske streets, began in August 2023. The land was donated by the local resident Živko Madžarević. The Serbian Orthodox Church will be dedicated to the Nativity of the Blessed Virgin Mary.

== Geography ==
Surčin is located in the eastern Syrmia region, 20km west of downtown Belgrade. It borders the municipalities of Zemun (north) and Novi Beograd (east). The western border of the municipality is the administrative border of the province of Vojvodina, while the Sava river forms the border to the municipalities of Čukarica (south-east) and Obrenovac (south).

The area of the municipality is flat and marshy as the entire southern section belongs to the floodplain of the Sava. Numerous smaller streams (mostly channeled) flow through the municipality, most notably the Galovica and Jarčina. Channeled stream Šuganica, fed by its own source, is located in the western section of the town itself. Other distinct geographical features are the ponds of Fenek and Živača, a large woody area of Bojčin (Serbian: Bojčinska šuma) and Progarska ada, one of the largest islands in the Sava.

Surčin lies just south of the Belgrade–Zagreb highway, on the Belgrade beltway which is expected to allow heavy traffic from the Belgrade's urban core to move directly to the city's southern outskirts (for now, it is the only European capital with a highway going through it). The Syrmian section of the beltway (which separates from the highway at Dobanovci, then goes to Surčin–Jakovo–Ostružnica) is already built and operational. A local Belgrade freight railway runs parallel to the beltway.

Crni Lug ("Black Grove") is a low, forested floodplain along the bend of the Sava river, between Progar and Boljevci. It is a patch of an oak forest. Crni Lug is located 30 km (19 mi) from downtown Belgrade and 20 km (12 mi) south of the Nikola Tesla Airport. Part of the region is organized as a hunting ground with a total area of 9.73 km^{2} (3.76 sq mi), of which 7.2 km^{2} (2.8 sq mi) is fenced. The venue is known for the organized group wild boar hunting. Apart from wild boar, European deer and roe deer are also being bred in the facility. There are two other hunting grounds in the municipality, Dobanovački Zabran ("Dobanovci Grove"), operated by the military, and Donji Srem ("Lower Syrmia").

Expansion of the population of jackals in the outskirts of Belgrade began in the early 2000s. As their number grew, the animals were regularly reported in the Surčin area. In the early 2020s, the environmentalists began tagging jackals around Surčin in order to monitor their activities.

== Settlements ==
Urban (towns):

- Surčin
- Dobanovci

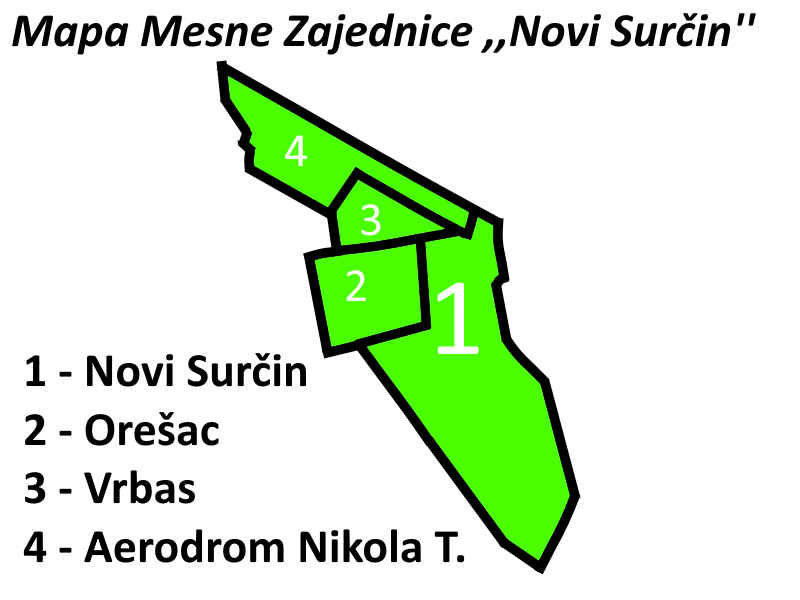
Eastern section of Surčin (town)

Rural (villages):

- Boljevci
- Bečmen
- Progar (with Bojčin)
- Petrovčić
- Jakovo (with the salaš Stremen)

Neighborhoods of Surčin (town)

- Novi Surčin (local community, sub-municipal administrative unit, which includes neighborhoods of Novi Surčin, Radiofar, Orešac and Vrbas)
- Radiofar
- Ključ
- Orešac
- Vrbas

== Demographics ==
Historical population
Year	Pop.	±%
1948	3,487	—
1953	3,599	+3.2%
1961	6,160	+71.2%
1971	10,654	+73.0%
1981	12,575	+18.0%
1991	12,264	−2.5%
2002	14,292	+16.5%
2011	18,205	+27.4%
2022	20,602	+13.2%

According to the 2022 census results, the municipality of Surčin has a population of 45,452 inhabitants, while the settlement has a population of 20,602. Though in the past the municipality had no urban connection with Belgrade on the east, that is, Novi Beograd's westernmost neighborhood of Ledine connected it to the city, an urban zone has developed along that road, turning Belgrade and Surčin into one continuous built-up area. Similar developments surround Surčin which, with the growth of population, grows into a single urban area with Dobanovci (north), Jakovo (south) and Bečmen (west).

=== Ethnic groups ===
The municipality of Surčin has a Serb ethnic majority, followed by Romani, Slovaks, Croats and other ethnic groups. The ethnic composition of the municipality:

Ethnic group	Population 2011
Serbs	37,866
Romani	1,415
Slovaks	1,254
Croats	373
Muslims	102
Macedonians	95
Yugoslavs	93
Montenegrins	89
Others	2,532
Total	43,819

== Administration ==
Former presidents of the municipality of Surčin are:

- 24 November 2003 – 3 November 2004: Vojislav Janošević (b. 1946) (Democratic Party, local community)
- 3 November 2004 – 24 November 2005: Rajko Matović (b. 1960) (Serbian Radical Party)
- 13 August 2004 – 24 November 2005: Vladimir Aleksandrov (b. 1940) (Serbian Radical Party; not confirmed by the Ministry for local self-rule)
- 24 November 2005 – August 2012: Vojislav Janošević (Democratic Party)
- August 2012 – November 2016: Vesna Šalović (Socialist Party of Serbia)
- November 2016 – present: Stevan Šuša (Serbian Progressive Party) - SNS

== Economy ==
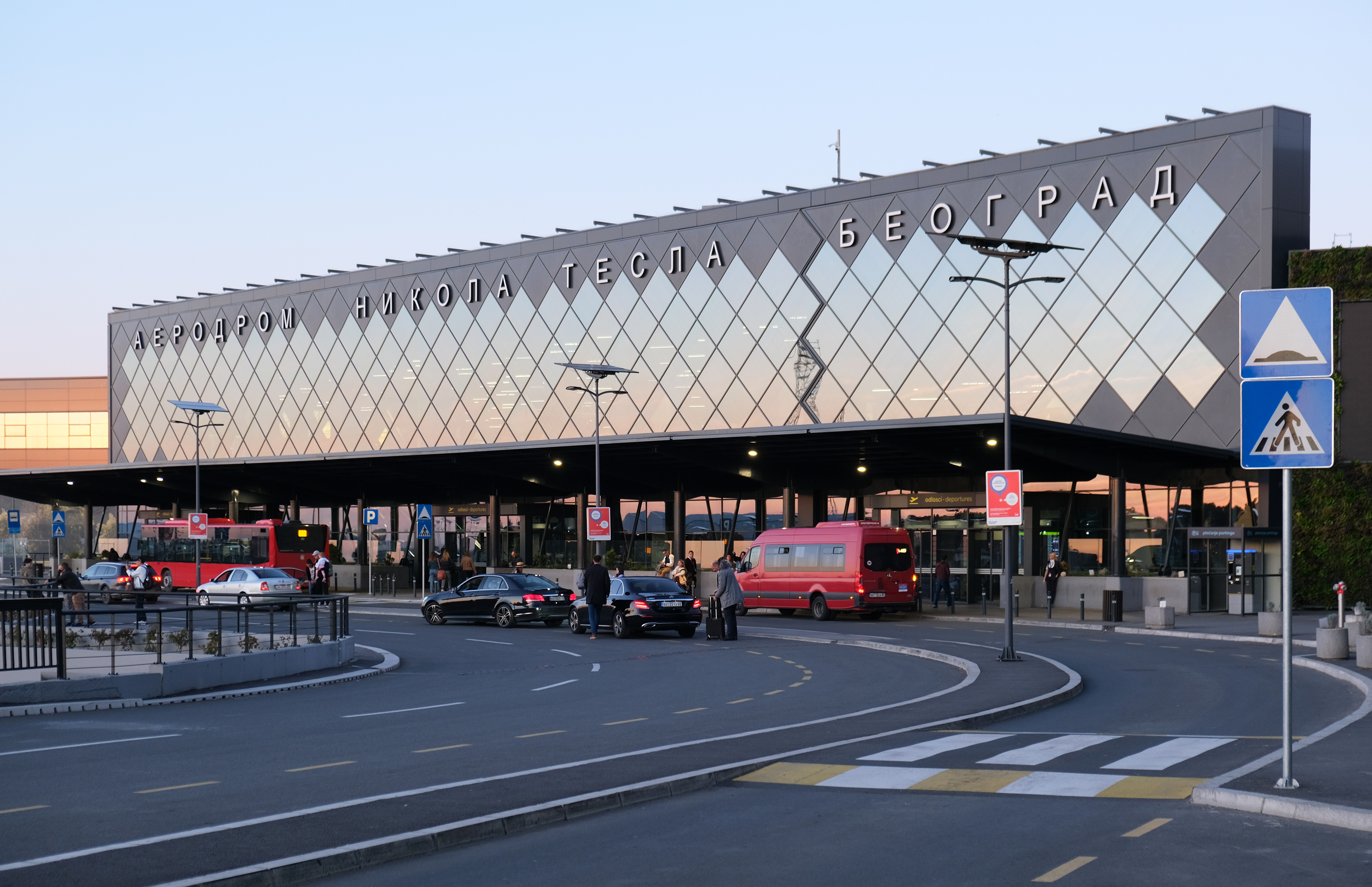
Nikola Tesla Airport

The majority of the population works in agriculture. Extensive farms for pig breeding are located in Surčin itself while in the smaller settlements the production is mostly for the Belgrade market, growing fruits and early vegetables.

The most important facility is Belgrade Nikola Tesla Airport, opened on April 28, 1962, replacing the old one in Bežanija. The new and modern airport put the small village on the map. The aeronautical museum is also located in the airport complex.

In the 2010s, the government decided to build a national stadium in Belgrade. After considering several locations around the city, it was finally decided to build it in the Surčin municipality. Unurbanized agricultural and green area between the Surčin town and the Sava river was selected. The plan was unveiled in October 2021. The stadium will cover 32 hectares (79 acres), it will receive 60,000 spectators, while the total complex surrounding it will spread on 114 hectares (280 acres). Not controversial to the level of other recent projects in Belgrade (Kalemegdan, Košutnjak, Makiš), the stadium isn't much supported either, especially because of the projected high price. The 2021 survey showed that only 34,8% of Belgraders support the project, but if the plan includes additional foreign credits, the support falls to just 13,3%. In June 2022, start of the construction was announced for August 2022. Reduced stadium, to 52,000 seats, according to the President of Serbia Aleksandar Vučić, will be "the most beautiful in the world".

The following table gives a preview of total number of registered people employed in legal entities per their core activity (as of 2022):

Activity	Total
Agriculture, forestry and fishing	257
Mining and quarrying	9
Manufacturing	3,509
Electricity, gas, steam and air conditioning supply	1
Water supply; sewerage, waste management and remediation activities	116
Construction	1,286
Wholesale and retail trade, repair of motor vehicles and motorcycles	5,110
Transportation and storage	4,910
Accommodation and food services	500
Information and communication	182
Financial and insurance activities	65
Real estate activities	34
Professional, scientific and technical activities	419
Administrative and support service activities	506
Public administration and defense; compulsory social security	270
Education	657
Human health and social work activities	235
Arts, entertainment and recreation	130
Other service activities	160
Individual agricultural workers	70
Total	18,426

== Sports ==
Local football club Jedinstvo competes in the third tier of the national league system.

== See also ==
- Subdivisions of Belgrade
- List of Belgrade neighborhoods and suburbs
- Municipalities of Serbia
- Cities and towns in Serbia
- Populated places of Serbia
