= Boljevci =

Boljevci Slovak: Boľovce
- Suburban settlement
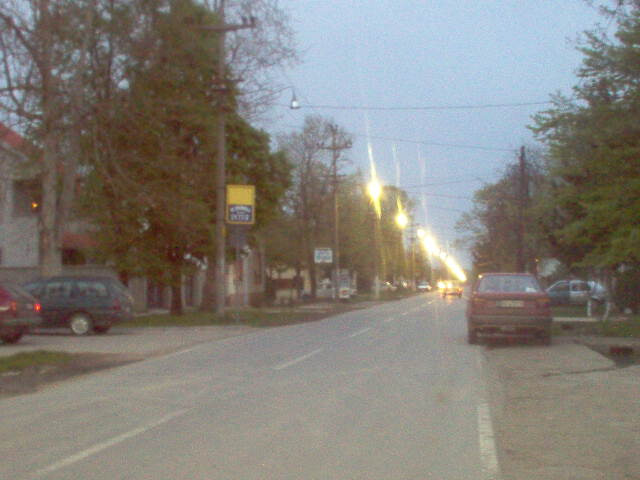
- Main street in Boljevci
- Interactive map of Boljevci
- Location within Serbia
- Coordinates: 44°43′N 20°13′E
- Country: Serbia

Area
  - Total: 60.30 km^{2} (23.28 sq mi)

Population (2011)
  - Total: 4,094
  - Density: 67.89/km^{2} (175.8/sq mi)
- Time zone: UTC+1 (CET)
  - Summer (DST): UTC+2 (CEST)

Boljevci (Serbian Cyrillic: Бољевци, pronounced [bǒ:ʎeʋtsi]) is a suburban settlement of Belgrade, Serbia. It is located in Belgrade's municipality of Surčin.

== Location ==
Boljevci is located on the left bank of the Sava river, in the south-central part of the municipality, in the Syrmia region (the sub-region of Podlužje, east of the Bojčinska woods). It is 12 kilometers south of its municipal seat, Surčin, and some 30 kilometers of downtown Belgrade. It is located on the road which connects Surčin to Progar (through Jakovo) and continues further into the province of Vojvodina (the village of Kupinovo).

== Demographics ==
Historical population
Year	Pop.	±%
1921	2,179	—
1931	2,802	+28.6%
1948	3,356	+19.8%
1953	3,648	+8.7%
1961	3,855	+5.7%
1971	4,011	+4.0%
1981	3,990	−0.5%
1991	4,061	+1.8%
2002	4,056	−0.1%
2011	4,094	+0.9%

Boljevci is statistically classified as a rural settlement (village). It had a steady population growth until the 1960s when the population began to fluctuate. According to the latest official population census, population on Boljevci was 4,094 in 2011.

Ethnic structure (census of 2002): Serbs 2,653 (65,41%), Slovaks 1,132 (27,91%), Yugoslavs 40 (0,98%).

The most well-known song of Slovak residents of Boljevci is Boľovčania čo robíte.

== Characteristics ==
The remains belonging to the Scordisci, a Celtic tribe which founded Singidunum and Taurunum, the predecessors of Belgrade and Zemun, respectively, were found in Boljevci.

Boljevci is located in the marshy floodplain of the Sava. On the west of Boljevci, is a larger pond of Živača, used for the "Boljevci" fish pond.

There is a nautical complex in Boljevci, the Nautical Village "Biser". It consists of the row of 16 floating bungalows and the berths on the Sava bank. Apart from restaurants, both on the water and on the land, the complex includes promenades, sports fields and the surrounding 12 ha (30 acres) of forest.

Until the early 1960s Boljevci had its own municipality which was then annexed to the municipality of Surčin.

After the WW2 communist created the PKB and took all agricultural land called "Livade" (Serbian) or "Pažiť & Drienska" (Slovak) from the Slovak church. The agricultural land has recently been returned to the church but the state didn't pay any compensation for using their land since second world war.

== Sources ==
- Jovan Đ. Marković (1990): Enciklopedijski geografski leksikon Jugoslavije; Svjetlost-Sarajevo; ISBN 86-01-02651-6
- Vlado Gallo, JuDr, Bratislava.
