= Obedska bara =

Coordinates: 44.7242°N 19.8797°E

Designations

Ramsar Wetland
- Designated: 28 March 1977
- Reference no.: 136

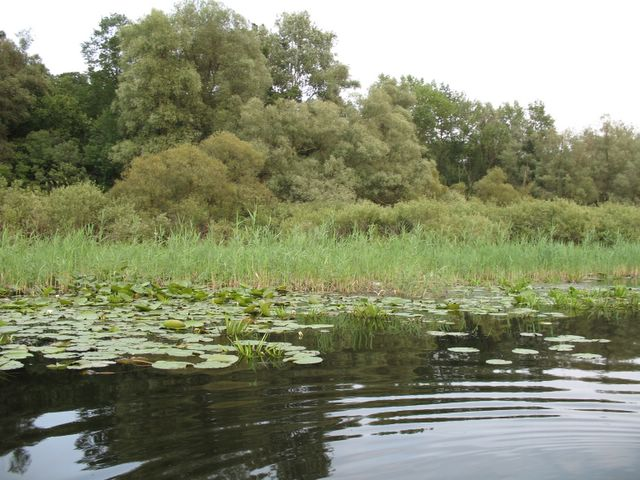
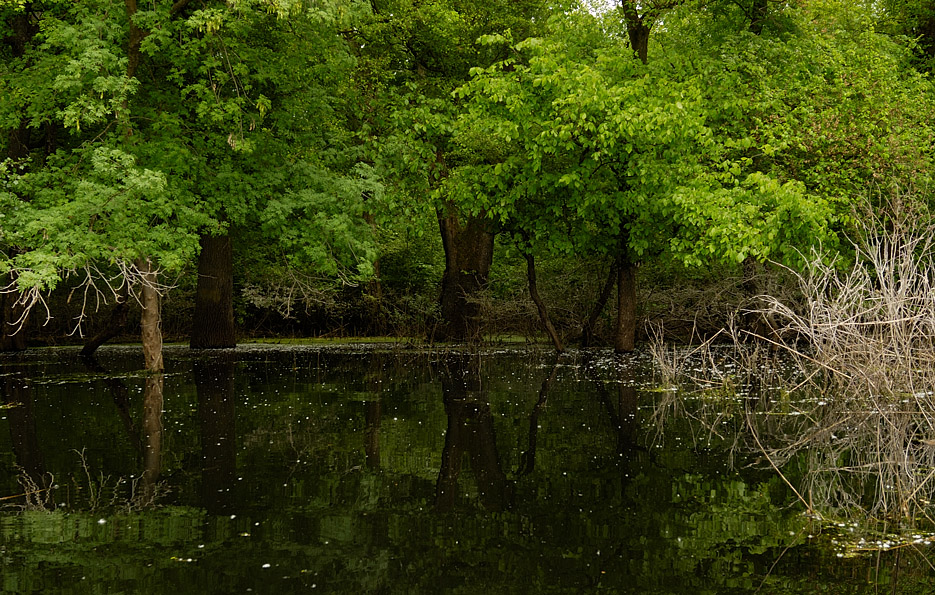

Obedska bara (Obedska pond or Obedska bog, Serbian Cyrillic: Обедска бара, pronounced [ɔ̂bɛdskaː bâra]) is a large swamp-forest area and natural reserve stretching along the Sava River in Serbia, in Southern Syrmia (Srem/Szerémség), some 40 km west of Belgrade.

The pond is an oxbow lake, a remnant of the meanders of the old Sava River, whose main stream presently flows more southward. Due to its shape the swampy bed of the pond, situated between the villages of Obrež and Kupinovo, is called “The Horse-shoe” (potkovica). Higher grounds with cut-in depressions and old oak forests are called “The Hoof” (kopito).

The pond is an authentic complex of stagnant tributaries, marshes, pits, marsh vegetation, damp meadows and forests. It is home to over 30 different water, swamp, forest and meadow biocoenoses. The fauna includes 220 species of birds, 50 species of mammals, 13 of amphibians, 11 of reptiles and 16 of fish, while the flora and funga includes 500 species of plants, 180 species of mushrooms and 50 species of moss. It is one of the richest and best preserved wildlife habitats in the Pannonian plain.

Obedska pond is one of the world's oldest nature areas, first administrative protective measures having been introduced in 1874, when the Habsburg Empire protected it as hunting ground of the royal family. Presently, it has first-category legal protection status, denoting a natural asset of exceptional value. Its status has been verified by the Ramsar Convention on swamps since 1977, and included in the List of areas of special significance for birds of Europe of Important Bird Area project, and UNESCO's list of world's most important wetland areas.
