= Ašanja =

Ašanja Ашања (Serbian)
- Village (Selo)
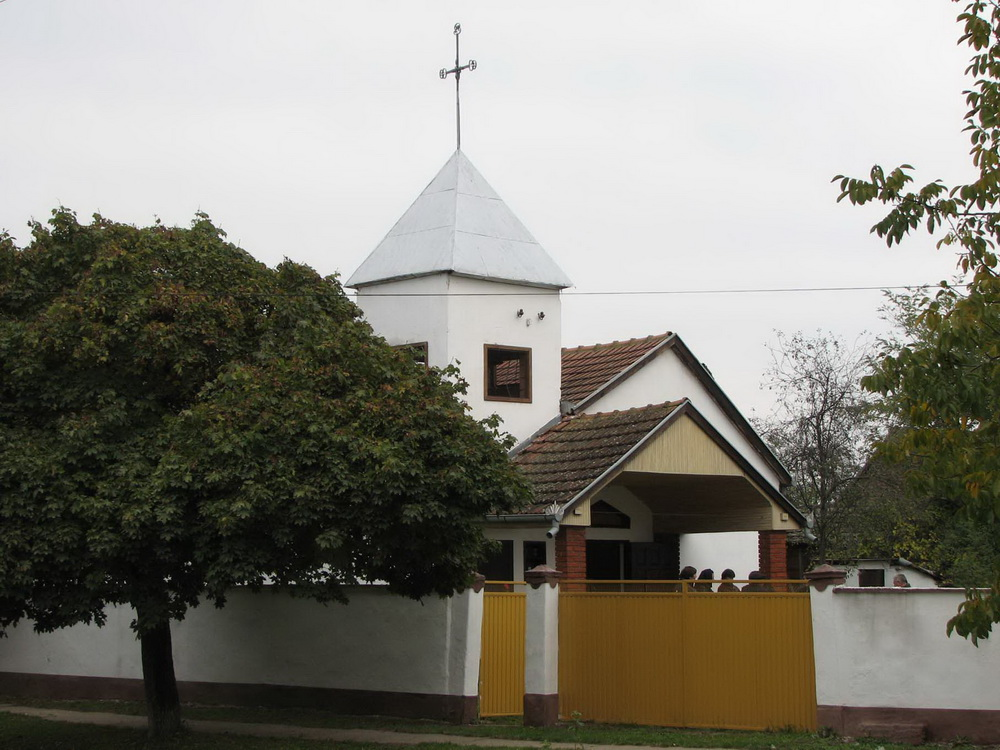

- Location within Vojvodina Location within Serbia
- Coordinates: 44°45′N 20°05′E
- Country: Serbia
- Province: Vojvodina
- District: Srem District
- Municipality or city: Pećinci

Population (2022)
  - Total: 1,253
- Time zone: UTC+1 (CET)
  - Summer (DST): UTC+2 (CEST)

Ašanja (Serbian Cyrillic: Ашања) is a village in Serbia. It is situated in the Pećinci municipality, in the Srem District of the Vojvodina Autonomous Province. The village has a Serb ethnic majority, with a population of 1,253 people (2022 census).

== See also ==
- List of places in Serbia
- List of cities, towns and villages in Vojvodina
