= Podlužje =

Geographical subregion of Syrmia, Serbia

Podlužje (Serbian Cyrillic: Подлужје) is a small geographical region in south-eastern Syrmia, Serbia. The western part of Podlužje belongs to the province of Vojvodina, while the eastern part administratively belongs to the City of Belgrade. The Fenek Monastery and nature reserve Obedska bara are situated in this region, as well as Kupinik Fortress, the former seat of the Serbian despots in Syrmia.

== See also ==
- List of regions of Serbia
