= List of placenames in Vojvodina in different languages =

This is a list of official and historical names of cities, towns, and villages in Vojvodina in the languages spoken in the region, including languages that were used historically.

Vojvodina was colonized by members of different ethnic groups over multiple centuries, with many of the settlements being named differently in the groups' different languages. Some settlements have undergone multiple changes of their official name, sometimes changing from one language to another. (Note: One such conscious renaming effort was undertaken in 1922, to officially Slavicise certain non-Slavic placenames in the territory that became a part of the Kingdom of Serbs, Croats, and Slovenes after World War I.)

In modern times, many of the cities, towns and villages have multiple official names, because certain minority languages have official status. At the provincial level, these languages are Hungarian, Slovak, Romanian, Rusyn, and Croatian. At the municipal level, depending on the ethnic composition, only some of these five minority languages are officially used, reflecting on the number of official names. Locally, certain other languages may be given official recognition. In some municipalities, only Serbian has official status.

== List ==
Municipality and its minority official languages (^{†} indicates Serbian only)	Current official names						Former official names	Other historical names
Municipality and its minority official languages (^{†} indicates Serbian only)	Serbian	Hungarian	Slovak	Romanian	Rusyn	Croatian	Various languages	
Ada: Hungarian	Ada	Ada	—	—	—	—		
Ada: Hungarian	Mol	Mohol	—	—	—	—		
Ada: Hungarian	Obornjača	Völgypart	—	—	—	—		
Ada: Hungarian	Sterijino	Valkaisor	—	—	—	—		
Ada: Hungarian	Utrine	Törökfalu	—	—	—	—		
Alibunar: Slovak; Romanian	Alibunar	—	—	Alibunar	—	—		
Alibunar: Slovak; Romanian	Vladimirovac	—	—	Petrovasâla	—	—		
Alibunar: Slovak; Romanian	Seleuš	—	—	Seleuș	—	—		
Alibunar: Slovak; Romanian	Nikolinci	—	—	Nicolinț	—	—		
Alibunar: Slovak; Romanian	Lokve	—	—	Sân-Mihai	—	—		
Alibunar: Slovak; Romanian	Janošik	—	Jánošík	—	—	—		
Alibunar: Slovak; Romanian	Banatski Karlovac	—	—	—	—	—		
Alibunar: Slovak; Romanian	Dobrica	—	—	—	—	—		
Alibunar: Slovak; Romanian	Ilandža	—	—	—	—	—		
Alibunar: Slovak; Romanian	Novi Kozjak	—	—	—	—	—		
Apatin: Hungarian in Kupusina and Svilojevo; Croatian in Sonta	Apatin	—	—	—	—	—		
Apatin: Hungarian in Kupusina and Svilojevo; Croatian in Sonta	Sonta	—	—	—	—	Sonta		
Apatin: Hungarian in Kupusina and Svilojevo; Croatian in Sonta	Kupusina	—	—	—	—	—		
Apatin: Hungarian in Kupusina and Svilojevo; Croatian in Sonta	Svilojevo	—	—	—	—	—		
Apatin: Hungarian in Kupusina and Svilojevo; Croatian in Sonta	Prigrevica	—	—	—	—	—		
Bač: Hungarian; Slovak; Croatian in Bođani and Plavna; Romani in Vajska	Bač	Bács	—	—	—	—		
Bač: Hungarian; Slovak; Croatian in Bođani and Plavna; Romani in Vajska	Bačko Novo Selo	Bácsújlak	—	—	—	—		
Bač: Hungarian; Slovak; Croatian in Bođani and Plavna; Romani in Vajska	Bođani	Bogyán	—	—	—	—		
Bač: Hungarian; Slovak; Croatian in Bođani and Plavna; Romani in Vajska	Vajska	Vajszka	—	—	—	—		
Bač: Hungarian; Slovak; Croatian in Bođani and Plavna; Romani in Vajska	Plavna	Palona	—	—	—	—		
Bač: Hungarian; Slovak; Croatian in Bođani and Plavna; Romani in Vajska	Selenča	Bácsújfalu	Selenča	—	—	—		
Bački Petrovac: Slovak	Bački Petrovac	—	Báčsky Petrovec	—	—	—		
Bački Petrovac: Slovak	Gložan	—	Hložany	—	—	—		
Bački Petrovac: Slovak	Kulpin	—	Kulpín	—	—	—	1853 Kulpin, 1905 Kolpeny, 1922 Kulpin.	
Bački Petrovac: Slovak	Maglić	—	—	—	—	—		
Bačka Palanka: Slovak	Bačka Palanka	—	Báčska Palanka	—	—	—	1853 Alt-Palanka and Neu-Palanka, 1881 Stara Palanka, Nemačka Palanka and Nova Palanka, from 1922 Stara Palanka, Bačka Palanka and Nova Palanka, from 1946 Bačka Palanka	
Bačka Palanka: Slovak	Čelarevo	—	Čelarevo	—	—	—	1853 Čeb (Cseb), until 1922 Duna-Cseb, from 1922 Čib, from 1947 Čelarevo	
Bačka Palanka: Slovak	Pivnice	—	Pivnica	—	—	—	1853 Pivnica, 1854 Pivnice, 1904 Pincéd, 1922 Pivnice	
Bačka Palanka: Slovak	Silbaš	—	Silbaš	—	—	—		
Bačka Palanka: Slovak	Vizić	—	—	—	—	—		
Bačka Palanka: Slovak	Gajdobra	—	—	—	—	—		
Bačka Palanka: Slovak	Despotovo	—	—	—	—	—	1853 Despot St. Ivan, until 1922 Urszentivan, from 1922 Despot Sveti Ivan, from 1947 Vasiljevo, from 1955 Despotovo	
Bačka Palanka: Slovak	Karađorđevo	—	—	—	—	—		
Bačka Palanka: Slovak	Mladenovo	—	—	—	—	—		
Bačka Palanka: Slovak	Neštin	—	—	—	—	—		
Bačka Palanka: Slovak	Nova Gajdobra	—	—	—	—	—		
Bačka Palanka: Slovak	Obrovac	—	—	—	—	—	1853 Obrovac, 1905 Borocz, 1922 Obrovac	
Bačka Palanka: Slovak	Parage	—	—	—	—	—		
Bačka Palanka: Slovak	Tovariševo	—	—	—	—	—	1853 Tovariševo, 1854 Tovarischevo, 1905 Bacstovaros, 1922 Tovariševo	
Bačka Topola: Hungarian; Slovak; Rusyn	Bačka Topola	Topolya	—	—	Бачка Тополя	—		
Bačka Topola: Hungarian; Slovak; Rusyn	Bajša	Bajsa	Bajša	—	Байша	—		
Bačka Topola: Hungarian; Slovak; Rusyn	Panonija	Pannónia	—	—	Панония	—		
Bačka Topola: Hungarian; Slovak; Rusyn	Srednji Salaš	Szurkos	—	—	Штреднї Салаш	—		
Bačka Topola: Hungarian; Slovak; Rusyn	Mićunovo	Karkatur	—	—	Мичуново	—		
Bačka Topola: Hungarian; Slovak; Rusyn	Gornja Rogatica	Falsőroglatica	—	—	Горня Роґатица	—		
Bačka Topola: Hungarian; Slovak; Rusyn	Bački Sokolac	Cserepes	—	—	Бачки Соколац	—		
Bačka Topola: Hungarian; Slovak; Rusyn	Krivaja	Krivaja	—	—	Кривая	—		
Bačka Topola: Hungarian; Slovak; Rusyn	Gunaroš	Gunaras	—	—	Ґунарош	—		
Bačka Topola: Hungarian; Slovak; Rusyn	Bogaraš	Bogaras	—	—	Боґарош	—		
Bačka Topola: Hungarian; Slovak; Rusyn	Kavilo	Kavilló	—	—	Кавило	—		
Bačka Topola: Hungarian; Slovak; Rusyn	Obornjača	Völgypart	—	—	Оборняча	—		
Bačka Topola: Hungarian; Slovak; Rusyn	Tomislavci	—	—	—	Томиславци	—		
Bačka Topola: Hungarian; Slovak; Rusyn	Pobeda	—	—	—	Побида	—		
Bačka Topola: Hungarian; Slovak; Rusyn	Bagremovo	Brazília	—	—	Баґремово	—		
Bačka Topola: Hungarian; Slovak; Rusyn	Mali Beograd	Kisbelgrád	—	—	Мали Беоґрад	—		
Bačka Topola: Hungarian; Slovak; Rusyn	Zobnatica	Zobnatica	—	—	Зобнатица	—		
Bačka Topola: Hungarian; Slovak; Rusyn	Karađorđevo	—	—	—	Карадьордєво	—		
Bačka Topola: Hungarian; Slovak; Rusyn	Novo Orahovo	Zentagunaras	—	—	Нове Орахово	—		
Bačka Topola: Hungarian; Slovak; Rusyn	Njegoševo	—	—	—	Нєґошево	—		
Bačka Topola: Hungarian; Slovak; Rusyn	Svetićevo	—	—	—	Светичево	—		
Bačka Topola: Hungarian; Slovak; Rusyn	Pačir	Pacsér	—	—	Пачир	—		
Bačka Topola: Hungarian; Slovak; Rusyn	Stara Moravica	Bácskossuthfalva	—	—	Стара Моравица	—		
Bečej: Hungarian	Bečej	Óbecse	—	—	—	—		
Bečej: Hungarian	Bačko Gradište	Bácsföldvár	—	—	—	—		
Bečej: Hungarian	Bačko Petrovo Selo	Péterréve	—	—	—	—		
Bečej: Hungarian	Mileševo	Drea	—	—	—	—		
Bečej: Hungarian	Radičević	—	—	—	—	—		
Bela Crkva: Hungarian; Romanian; Czech	Bela Crkva	Fehértemplom	—	Biserica Albă	—	—		
Bela Crkva: Hungarian; Romanian; Czech	Banatska Palanka	Palánk	—	—	—	—		
Bela Crkva: Hungarian; Romanian; Czech	Banatska Subotica	Krassószombat	—	—	—	—		
Bela Crkva: Hungarian; Romanian; Czech	Vračev Gaj	Varázsliget	—	—	—	—		
Bela Crkva: Hungarian; Romanian; Czech	Grebenac	Gerebenc	—	Grebenaț	—	—		
Bela Crkva: Hungarian; Romanian; Czech	Dobričevo	Udvarszállás	—	—	—	—		
Bela Crkva: Hungarian; Romanian; Czech	Dupljaja	Temesváralja	—	—	—	—		
Bela Crkva: Hungarian; Romanian; Czech	Jasenovo	Jaszenova	—	—	—	—		
Bela Crkva: Hungarian; Romanian; Czech	Kajtasovo	Gajtás	—	—	—	—		
Bela Crkva: Hungarian; Romanian; Czech	Kaluđerovo	Szőlőshegy	—	—	—	—		
Bela Crkva: Hungarian; Romanian; Czech	Kruščica	Körtéd	—	—	—	—		
Bela Crkva: Hungarian; Romanian; Czech	Kusić	Kusics	—	—	—	—		
Bela Crkva: Hungarian; Romanian; Czech	Crvena Crkva	Vöröstemplom	—	—	—	—		
Bela Crkva: Hungarian; Romanian; Czech	Češko Selo	Csehfalva	—	—	—	—		
Beočin: Slovak in Lug	Beočin	—	—	—	—	—		
Beočin: Slovak in Lug	Lug	—	Lug	—	—	—		
Beočin: Slovak in Lug	Banoštor	—	—	—	—	—		
Beočin: Slovak in Lug	Grabovo	—	—	—	—	—		
Beočin: Slovak in Lug	Rakovac	—	—	—	—	—		
Beočin: Slovak in Lug	Sviloš	—	—	—	—	—		
Beočin: Slovak in Lug	Susek	—	—	—	—	—		
Beočin: Slovak in Lug	Čerević	—	—	—	—	—		
Čoka: Hungarian	Čoka	Csóka	—	—	—	—		
Čoka: Hungarian	Vrbica	Egyházaskér	—	—	—	—		
Čoka: Hungarian	Jazovo	Hódegyháza	—	—	—	—		
Čoka: Hungarian	Ostojićevo	Tiszaszentmiklós	Ostojćevo	—	—	—		
Čoka: Hungarian	Padej	Padé	—	—	—	—		
Čoka: Hungarian	Sanad	Szanád	—	—	—	—		
Čoka: Hungarian	Crna Bara	Feketetó	—	—	—	—		
Čoka: Hungarian	Banatski Monoštor	Kanizsamonostor	—	—	—	—		
Kanjiža: Hungarian	Kanjiža	Magyarkanizsa	—	—	—	—		
Kanjiža: Hungarian	Adorjan	Adorján	—	—	—	—		
Kanjiža: Hungarian	Velebit	—	—	—	—	—		
Kanjiža: Hungarian	Vojvoda Zimonjić	—	—	—	—	—		
Kanjiža: Hungarian	Male Pijace	Kispiac	—	—	—	—		
Kanjiža: Hungarian	Martonoš	Martonos	—	—	—	—		
Kanjiža: Hungarian	Mali Pesak	Kishomok	—	—	—	—		
Kanjiža: Hungarian	Orom	Orom	—	—	—	—		
Kanjiža: Hungarian	Doline	Völgyes	—	—	—	—		
Kanjiža: Hungarian	Novo Selo	Újfalu	—	—	—	—		
Kanjiža: Hungarian	Trešnjevac	Oromhegyes	—	—	—	—		
Kanjiža: Hungarian	Totovo Selo	Tóthfalu	—	—	—	—		
Kanjiža: Hungarian	Horgoš	Horgos	—	—	—	—		
Kikinda: Hungarian in Kikinda, Banatska Topola, Rusko Selo, Sajan	Kikinda	Nagykikinda	—	—	—	—		
Kikinda: Hungarian in Kikinda, Banatska Topola, Rusko Selo, Sajan	Banatska Topola	Töröktopolya	—	—	—	—		
Kikinda: Hungarian in Kikinda, Banatska Topola, Rusko Selo, Sajan	Banatsko Veliko Selo	Szenthubert	—	—	—	—		
Kikinda: Hungarian in Kikinda, Banatska Topola, Rusko Selo, Sajan	Bašaid	Basahíd	—	—	—	—		
Kikinda: Hungarian in Kikinda, Banatska Topola, Rusko Selo, Sajan	Iđoš	Tiszahegyes	—	—	—	—		
Kikinda: Hungarian in Kikinda, Banatska Topola, Rusko Selo, Sajan	Mokrin	Mokrin	—	—	—	—		
Kikinda: Hungarian in Kikinda, Banatska Topola, Rusko Selo, Sajan	Nakovo	Nákófalva	—	—	—	—		
Kikinda: Hungarian in Kikinda, Banatska Topola, Rusko Selo, Sajan	Novi Kozarci	Nagytószeg	—	—	—	—		
Kikinda: Hungarian in Kikinda, Banatska Topola, Rusko Selo, Sajan	Rusko Selo	Kisorosz	—	—	—	—		
Kikinda: Hungarian in Kikinda, Banatska Topola, Rusko Selo, Sajan	Sajan	Szaján	—	—	—	—		
Kovačica: Hungarian; Slovak; Romanian	Kovačica	Antalfalva	Kovačica	—	—	—		
Kovačica: Hungarian; Slovak; Romanian	Debeljača	Torontálvásárhely	—	—	—	—		
Kovačica: Hungarian; Slovak; Romanian	Idvor	Udvar	—	—	—	—		
Kovačica: Hungarian; Slovak; Romanian	Padina	Nagylajosfalva	Padina	—	—	—		
Kovačica: Hungarian; Slovak; Romanian	Putnikovo	—	—	—	—	—		
Kovačica: Hungarian; Slovak; Romanian	Samoš	Számos	—	—	—	—		
Kovačica: Hungarian; Slovak; Romanian	Uzdin	Újozora	—	Uzdin	—	—		
Kovačica: Hungarian; Slovak; Romanian	Crepaja	Cserépalja	—	—	—	—		
Kovin: Hungarian; Romanian	Kovin	Kevevára	—	Cuvin	—	—		
Kovin: Hungarian; Romanian	Bavanište	Homokbálványos	—	—	—	—		
Kovin: Hungarian; Romanian	Gaj	Gálya	—	—	—	—		
Kovin: Hungarian; Romanian	Deliblato	Deliblát	—	Deliblata	—	—		
Kovin: Hungarian; Romanian	Dubovac	Dunadombó	—	—	—	—		
Kovin: Hungarian; Romanian	Šumarak	Emánueltelep	—	—	—	—		
Kovin: Hungarian; Romanian	Malo Bavanište	Kisbálványos	—	—	—	—		
Kovin: Hungarian; Romanian	Mramorak	Homokos	—	Maramorac	—	—		
Kovin: Hungarian; Romanian	Pločica	Kevepallós	—	—	—	—		
Kovin: Hungarian; Romanian	Skorenovac	Székelykeve	—	—	—	—		
Kula: Hungarian; Rusyn	Kula	Kúla	—	—	Кула	—		
Kula: Hungarian; Rusyn	Kruščić	Veprőd	—	—	Крущич	—		
Kula: Hungarian; Rusyn	Lipar	Lipár	—	—	Липар	—		
Kula: Hungarian; Rusyn	Nova Crvenka	—	—	—	Нова Червинка	—		
Kula: Hungarian; Rusyn	Ruski Krstur	Bácskeresztúr	—	—	Руски Керестур	—		
Kula: Hungarian; Rusyn	Sivac	Szivác	—	—	Сивец	—		
Kula: Hungarian; Rusyn	Crvenka	Cservenka	—	—	Червинка	—		
Mali Iđoš: Hungarian; Montenegrin	Mali Iđoš	Kishegyes	—	—	—	—		
Mali Iđoš: Hungarian; Montenegrin	Lovćenac	Szikics	—	—	—	—		
Mali Iđoš: Hungarian; Montenegrin	Feketić	Bácsfeketehegy	—	—	—	—		
Nova Crnja: Hungarian	Nova Crnja	Magyarcsernye	—	—	—	—		
Nova Crnja: Hungarian	Aleksandrovo	—	—	—	—	—		
Nova Crnja: Hungarian	Vojvoda Stepa	—	—	—	—	—		
Nova Crnja: Hungarian	Radojevo	Klári	—	—	—	—		
Nova Crnja: Hungarian	Srpska Crnja	Szerbecsernye	—	—	—	—		
Nova Crnja: Hungarian	Toba	Tóba	—	—	—	—		
Novi Bečej: Hungarian	Novi Bečej	Törökbecse	—	—	—	—		
Novi Bečej: Hungarian	Bočar	Bocsár	—	—	—	—		
Novi Bečej: Hungarian	Kumane	Kumán	—	—	—	—		
Novi Bečej: Hungarian	Novo Miloševo	Beodra - Karlova	—	—	—	—		
Novi Kneževac: Hungarian	Novi Kneževac	Törökkanizsa	—	—	—	—		
Novi Kneževac: Hungarian	Banatsko Aranđelovo	Oroszlámos	—	—	—	—		
Novi Kneževac: Hungarian	Đala	Gyála	—	—	—	—		
Novi Kneževac: Hungarian	Majdan	Majdány	—	—	—	—		
Novi Kneževac: Hungarian	Rabe	Rábé	—	—	—	—		
Novi Kneževac: Hungarian	Filić	Firigyháza	—	—	—	—		
Novi Kneževac: Hungarian	Podlokanj	Podlokány	—	—	—	—		
Novi Kneževac: Hungarian	Siget	Sziget	—	—	—	—		
Novi Kneževac: Hungarian	Srpski Krstur	Szerbkeresztúr	—	—	—	—		
Novi Sad: Hungarian; Slovak; Rusyn	Novi Sad	Újvidék	Nový Sad	—	Нови Сад	—	1748 Neoplanta / Neusatz / Novi Sad / Újvidék	Petrovaradinski šanac (prior to 1748)
Novi Sad: Hungarian; Slovak; Rusyn	Begeč	Begecs	Begeč	—	Беґеч	—	1853 Begeč, 1854 Begecs	
Novi Sad: Hungarian; Slovak; Rusyn	Budisava	Tiszakálmánfalva	—	—	Будисава	—		
Novi Sad: Hungarian; Slovak; Rusyn	Bukovac	Bukovác	—	—	Буковец	—		
Novi Sad: Hungarian; Slovak; Rusyn	Veternik	Veternik	—	—	Ветерник	—		
Novi Sad: Hungarian; Slovak; Rusyn	Kać	Káty	—	—	Кать	—		
Novi Sad: Hungarian; Slovak; Rusyn	Kisač	Kiszács	Kysáč	—	Кисач	—		
Novi Sad: Hungarian; Slovak; Rusyn	Kovilj	Kabol	—	—	Ковиль	—		
Novi Sad: Hungarian; Slovak; Rusyn	Ledinci	Ledinci	—	—	Лединци	—		
Novi Sad: Hungarian; Slovak; Rusyn	Petrovaradin	Pétervárad	—	—	Петроварадин	—		
Novi Sad: Hungarian; Slovak; Rusyn	Rumenka	Piros	—	—	Руменка	—		
Novi Sad: Hungarian; Slovak; Rusyn	Sremska Kamenica	Kamenica	—	—	Сримска Каменїца	—		
Novi Sad: Hungarian; Slovak; Rusyn	Stepanovićevo	—	—	—	Степановичево	—		
Novi Sad: Hungarian; Slovak; Rusyn	Stari Ledinci	—	—	—	Стари Лединци	—		
Novi Sad: Hungarian; Slovak; Rusyn	Futog	Futak	—	—	Футоґ	—	1853 Alt Futak (and Neu Futak), 1878 O Futak (and Uj Futak), 1897 Stari Futog (and Novi Futog), from 1946 Futog.	
Novi Sad: Hungarian; Slovak; Rusyn	Čenej	Csenej	—	—	Ченей	—		
Odžaci: Hungarian; Slovak	Odžaci	Hódság	—	—	—	—		
Odžaci: Hungarian; Slovak	Bački Brestovac	Szyilberek	—	—	—	—		
Odžaci: Hungarian; Slovak	Bački Gračac	Szentfülöp	—	—	—	—		
Odžaci: Hungarian; Slovak	Bogojevo	Gombos	—	—	—	—		
Odžaci: Hungarian; Slovak	Deronje	Dernye	—	—	—	—		
Odžaci: Hungarian; Slovak	Karavukovo	Karavukova	—	—	—	—		
Odžaci: Hungarian; Slovak	Lalić	—	Lalit'	—	—	—		
Odžaci: Hungarian; Slovak	Ratkovo	—	—	—	—	—		
Odžaci: Hungarian; Slovak	Srpski Miletić	Militics	—	—	—	—		
Plandište: Hungarian; Slovak; Romanian; Macedonian	Plandište	Zichyfalva	—	—	—	—		
Plandište: Hungarian; Slovak; Romanian; Macedonian	Banatski Sokolac	Biószeg	—	—	—	—		
Plandište: Hungarian; Slovak; Romanian; Macedonian	Barice	Szentjános	—	Sân-Ianăș	—	—		
Plandište: Hungarian; Slovak; Romanian; Macedonian	Velika Greda	Györgyháza	—	—	—	—		
Plandište: Hungarian; Slovak; Romanian; Macedonian	Veliki Gaj	Nagygáj	—	—	—	—		
Plandište: Hungarian; Slovak; Romanian; Macedonian	Dužine	Szécsenfalva	—	—	—	—		
Plandište: Hungarian; Slovak; Romanian; Macedonian	Jermenovci	Ürményháza	—	—	—	—		
Plandište: Hungarian; Slovak; Romanian; Macedonian	Kupinik	—	—	—	—	—		
Plandište: Hungarian; Slovak; Romanian; Macedonian	Margita	Nagymargita	—	Mărghita	—	—		
Plandište: Hungarian; Slovak; Romanian; Macedonian	Laudonovac	Laudon	—	—	—	—		
Plandište: Hungarian; Slovak; Romanian; Macedonian	Markovićevo	Torontálújfalu	—	—	—	—		
Plandište: Hungarian; Slovak; Romanian; Macedonian	Miletićevo	Rárós	—	—	—	—		
Plandište: Hungarian; Slovak; Romanian; Macedonian	Stari Lec	Óléc	—	—	—	—		
Plandište: Hungarian; Slovak; Romanian; Macedonian	Hajdučica	Istvánvölgy	Hajdušica	—	—	—		
Senta: Hungarian	Senta	Zenta	—	—	—	—		
Senta: Hungarian	Gornji Breg	Felsőhegy	—	—	—	—		
Senta: Hungarian	Tornjoš	Tornyos	—	—	—	—		
Senta: Hungarian	Bogaraš	Bogaras	—	—	—	—		
Senta: Hungarian	Kevi	Kevi	—	—	—	—		
Sombor: Hungarian; Croatian in Bački Monoštor, Bački Breg, Svetozar Miletić	Sombor	Zombor	—	—	—	Sombor		
Sombor: Hungarian; Croatian in Bački Monoštor, Bački Breg, Svetozar Miletić	Aleksa Šantić	Sári	—	—	—	—		
Sombor: Hungarian; Croatian in Bački Monoštor, Bački Breg, Svetozar Miletić	Bački Breg	Béreg	—	—	—	Bereg		
Sombor: Hungarian; Croatian in Bački Monoštor, Bački Breg, Svetozar Miletić	Bački Monoštor	Monostorszeg	—	—	—	Monoštor		
Sombor: Hungarian; Croatian in Bački Monoštor, Bački Breg, Svetozar Miletić	Bezdan	Bezdán	—	—	—	—		
Sombor: Hungarian; Croatian in Bački Monoštor, Bački Breg, Svetozar Miletić	Gakovo	Gádor	—	—	—	—		
Sombor: Hungarian; Croatian in Bački Monoštor, Bački Breg, Svetozar Miletić	Doroslovo	Doroszló	—	—	—	—		
Sombor: Hungarian; Croatian in Bački Monoštor, Bački Breg, Svetozar Miletić	Kljajićevo	Kerény	—	—	—	—		
Sombor: Hungarian; Croatian in Bački Monoštor, Bački Breg, Svetozar Miletić	Kolut	Küllőd	—	—	—	—		
Sombor: Hungarian; Croatian in Bački Monoštor, Bački Breg, Svetozar Miletić	Rastina	—	—	—	—	—		
Sombor: Hungarian; Croatian in Bački Monoštor, Bački Breg, Svetozar Miletić	Riđica	Regőce	—	—	—	—		
Sombor: Hungarian; Croatian in Bački Monoštor, Bački Breg, Svetozar Miletić	Svetozar Miletić	Nemesmilitics	—	—	—	—		
Sombor: Hungarian; Croatian in Bački Monoštor, Bački Breg, Svetozar Miletić	Stanišić	Őrszállás	—	—	—	—		
Sombor: Hungarian; Croatian in Bački Monoštor, Bački Breg, Svetozar Miletić	Stapar	Sztapár	—	—	—	—		
Sombor: Hungarian; Croatian in Bački Monoštor, Bački Breg, Svetozar Miletić	Telečka	Bácsgyulafalva	—	—	—	—		
Sombor: Hungarian; Croatian in Bački Monoštor, Bački Breg, Svetozar Miletić	Čonoplja	Csonoplya	—	—	—	—		
Srbobran: Hungarian	Srbobran	Szenttamás	—	—	—	—		
Srbobran: Hungarian	Nadalj	Nádalja	—	—	—	—		
Srbobran: Hungarian	Turija	Turia	—	—	—	—		
Subotica: Hungarian; Croatian; Bunjevac	Subotica	Szabadka	—	—	—	Subotica		
Subotica: Hungarian; Croatian; Bunjevac	Bajmok	Bajmok	—	—	—	Bajmak		
Subotica: Hungarian; Croatian; Bunjevac	Mišićevo	—	—	—	—	—		
Subotica: Hungarian; Croatian; Bunjevac	Bački Vinogradi	Királyhalom	—	—	—	Kraljev Brig		
Subotica: Hungarian; Croatian; Bunjevac	Bikovo	Békova	—	—	—	—		
Subotica: Hungarian; Croatian; Bunjevac	Gornji Tavankut	Felsőtavankút	—	—	—	—		
Subotica: Hungarian; Croatian; Bunjevac	Donji Tavankut	Alsótavankút	—	—	—	—		
Subotica: Hungarian; Croatian; Bunjevac	Ljutovo	Mérges	—	—	—	Mirgeš		
Subotica: Hungarian; Croatian; Bunjevac	Hajdukovo	Hajdújárás	—	—	—	—		
Subotica: Hungarian; Croatian; Bunjevac	Šupljak	Ludas	—	—	—	—		
Subotica: Hungarian; Croatian; Bunjevac	Đurđin	Györgyén	—	—	—	—		
Subotica: Hungarian; Croatian; Bunjevac	Kelebija	Kelebia	—	—	—	—		
Subotica: Hungarian; Croatian; Bunjevac	Mala Bosna	Kisbosznia	—	—	—	—		
Subotica: Hungarian; Croatian; Bunjevac	Novi Žednik	Ujzsednik	—	—	—	—		
Subotica: Hungarian; Croatian; Bunjevac	Stari Žednik	Nagyfény	—	—	—	Žednik		
Subotica: Hungarian; Croatian; Bunjevac	Palić	Palics	—	—	—	—		
Subotica: Hungarian; Croatian; Bunjevac	Čantavir	Csantavér	—	—	—	—		
Subotica: Hungarian; Croatian; Bunjevac	Bačko Dušanovo	Dusanovó	—	—	—	—		
Subotica: Hungarian; Croatian; Bunjevac	Višnjevac	Visnyevác	—	—	—	—		
Temerin: Hungarian	Temerin	Temerin	—	—	—	—		
Temerin: Hungarian	Bački Jarak	Járek	—	—	—	—		
Temerin: Hungarian	Sirig	Szőreg	—	—	—	—		
Titel: Hungarian	Titel	Titel	—	—	—	—		
Titel: Hungarian	Vilovo	Tündéres	—	—	—	—		
Titel: Hungarian	Gardinovci	Dunagárdony	—	—	—	—		
Titel: Hungarian	Lok	Sajkáslak	—	—	—	—		
Titel: Hungarian	Mošorin	Mozsor	—	—	—	—	1853 Moschorin, 1904 Mozsor, 1922 Mošorin	
Titel: Hungarian	Šajkaš	Sajkásszentiván	—	—	—	—		
Vrbas: Hungarian; Rusyn	Vrbas	Verbász	—	—	Вербас	—		
Vrbas: Hungarian; Rusyn	Bačko Dobro Polje	Kiskér	—	—	Бачке Добре Польо	—	1853 Klein Ker, 1861 Mali Ker, 1878 Kiš Ker, 1905 Kišker, 1922 Pribićevićevo, until 1933	
Vrbas: Hungarian; Rusyn	Zmajevo	Ókér	—	—	Змаєво	—	1853 Alt Ker, 1854 Ó-Kér, 1859 Stari Ker, 1864 Gros Ker, 1905 Stari Ker / Ó-Kér, 1922 Pašićevo, 1947 Zmajevo	Kér
Vrbas: Hungarian; Rusyn	Kosančić	—	—	—	Косанчич	—		
Vrbas: Hungarian; Rusyn	Kucura	Kucora	—	—	Коцур	—		
Vrbas: Hungarian; Rusyn	Ravno Selo	Újsóvé	—	—	Равне Село	—		
Vrbas: Hungarian; Rusyn	Savino Selo	Torzsa	—	—	Савине Село	—	until 1947 Torža, Torzsa, from 1947 Savino Selo	
Vršac: Hungarian; Romanian	Vršac	Versec	—	Vârșeț	—	—		
Vršac: Hungarian; Romanian	Vatin	Versecvat	—	—	—	—		
Vršac: Hungarian; Romanian	Veliko Središte	Nagyszered	—	—	—	—		
Vršac: Hungarian; Romanian	Vlajkovac	Temesvajkóc	—	Vlaicovăț	—	—		
Vršac: Hungarian; Romanian	Vojvodinci	Vajdalak	—	Voivodinț	—	—		
Vršac: Hungarian; Romanian	Vršački Ritovi	—	—	—	—	—		
Vršac: Hungarian; Romanian	Gudurica	Temeskutas	—	—	—	—		
Vršac: Hungarian; Romanian	Zagajica	Fürjes	—	—	—	—		
Vršac: Hungarian; Romanian	Izbište	Izbiste	—	—	—	—		
Vršac: Hungarian; Romanian	Jablanka	Almád	—	Iablanca	—	—		
Vršac: Hungarian; Romanian	Kuštilj	Mélykastély	—	Coștei	—	—		
Vršac: Hungarian; Romanian	Mali Žam	Kiszsám	—	Jamul Mic	—	—		
Vršac: Hungarian; Romanian	Malo Središte	Kisszered	—	Pârneaora	—	—		
Vršac: Hungarian; Romanian	Markovac	Márktelke	—	Marcovăț	—	—		
Vršac: Hungarian; Romanian	Mesić	Meszesfalu	—	Mesici	—	—		
Vršac: Hungarian; Romanian	Orešac	Homokdiód	—	Oreșac	—	—		
Vršac: Hungarian; Romanian	Pavliš	Temespaulis	—	—	—	—		
Vršac: Hungarian; Romanian	Parta	Párta	—	—	—	—		
Vršac: Hungarian; Romanian	Potporanj	Porány	—	—	—	—		
Vršac: Hungarian; Romanian	Ritiševo	Réthely	—	Râtișor	—	—		
Vršac: Hungarian; Romanian	Sočica	Temesszőlős	—	Sălcița	—	—		
Vršac: Hungarian; Romanian	Straža	Temesőr	—	Straja	—	—		
Vršac: Hungarian; Romanian	Uljma	Homokszil	—	—	—	—		
Vršac: Hungarian; Romanian	Šušara	Fejértelep	—	—	—	—		
Zrenjanin: Hungarian; Slovak; Romanian	Zrenjanin	Nagybecskerek	Zreňanin	Zrenianin	—	—		
Zrenjanin: Hungarian; Slovak; Romanian	Aradac	Aradác	Aradáč	—	—	—		
Zrenjanin: Hungarian; Slovak; Romanian	Banatski Despotovac	Ernőháza	—	—	—	—		
Zrenjanin: Hungarian; Slovak; Romanian	Belo Blato	Erzsébetlak	Biele Blato	—	—	—		
Zrenjanin: Hungarian; Slovak; Romanian	Botoš	Botos	—	—	—	—		
Zrenjanin: Hungarian; Slovak; Romanian	Elemir	Elemér	—	—	—	—		
Zrenjanin: Hungarian; Slovak; Romanian	Ečka	Écska	—	Ecica	—	—		
Zrenjanin: Hungarian; Slovak; Romanian	Jankov Most	Jankahíd	—	Iancaid	—	—		
Zrenjanin: Hungarian; Slovak; Romanian	Klek	Begafő	—	Clec	—	—		
Zrenjanin: Hungarian; Slovak; Romanian	Knićanin	Rezsőháza	—	—	—	—		
Zrenjanin: Hungarian; Slovak; Romanian	Lazarevo	Lázárföld	—	—	—	—		
Zrenjanin: Hungarian; Slovak; Romanian	Lukino Selo	Lukácsfalva	—	—	—	—		
Zrenjanin: Hungarian; Slovak; Romanian	Lukićevo	Zsigmondfalva	—	—	—	—		
Zrenjanin: Hungarian; Slovak; Romanian	Melenci	Melence	—	—	—	—		
Zrenjanin: Hungarian; Slovak; Romanian	Mihajlovo	Szentmihály	—	—	—	—		
Zrenjanin: Hungarian; Slovak; Romanian	Orlovat	Orlód	—	—	—	—		
Zrenjanin: Hungarian; Slovak; Romanian	Perlez	Perlasz	—	—	—	—		
Zrenjanin: Hungarian; Slovak; Romanian	Stajićevo	Óécska	—	—	—	—		
Zrenjanin: Hungarian; Slovak; Romanian	Taraš	Tiszatarrós	—	—	—	—		
Zrenjanin: Hungarian; Slovak; Romanian	Tomaševac	Tamáslaka	—	—	—	—		
Zrenjanin: Hungarian; Slovak; Romanian	Farkaždin	Farkasd	—	—	—	—		
Zrenjanin: Hungarian; Slovak; Romanian	Čenta	Csenta	—	—	—	—		
Žitište: Hungarian; Romanian	Žitište	Begaszentgyörgy	—	—	—	—		
Žitište: Hungarian; Romanian	Banatski Dvor	Udvarnok	—	—	—	—		
Žitište: Hungarian; Romanian	Banatsko Višnjićevo	Vida	—	—	—	—		
Žitište: Hungarian; Romanian	Banatsko Karađorđevo	—	—	—	—	—		
Žitište: Hungarian; Romanian	Torak	Torák	—	Torac	—	—		
Žitište: Hungarian; Romanian	Međa	Párdány	—	—	—	—		
Žitište: Hungarian; Romanian	Novi Itebej	Magyarittabé	—	—	—	—		
Žitište: Hungarian; Romanian	Ravni Topolovac	Katalinfalva	—	—	—	—		
Žitište: Hungarian; Romanian	Srpski Itebej	Szerbittabé	—	—	—	—		
Žitište: Hungarian; Romanian	Torda	Torda	—	—	—	—		
Žitište: Hungarian; Romanian	Hetin	Tamásfalva	—	—	—	—		
Žitište: Hungarian; Romanian	Čestereg	Csősztelek	—	—	—	—		
Inđija: Hungarian in Maradik; Slovak in Slankamenački Vinogradi; Croatian in Stari Slankamen	Inđija	—	—	—	—	—		
Inđija: Hungarian in Maradik; Slovak in Slankamenački Vinogradi; Croatian in Stari Slankamen	Slankamenački Vinogradi	—	Slankamenské Vinohrady	—	—	—		
Irig: Hungarian in Dobrodol and Šatrinci	Irig	—	—	—	—	—		
Opovo^{†}	Opovo	—	—	—	—	—		
Pančevo: Hungarian in Ivanovo; Romanian in Banatsko Novo Selo; Bulgarian in Ivanovo; Macedonian in Jabuka and Kačarevo	Pančevo	—	—	Panciova	—	—		
Pančevo: Hungarian in Ivanovo; Romanian in Banatsko Novo Selo; Bulgarian in Ivanovo; Macedonian in Jabuka and Kačarevo	Dolovo	—	—	Doloave	—	—		
Pančevo: Hungarian in Ivanovo; Romanian in Banatsko Novo Selo; Bulgarian in Ivanovo; Macedonian in Jabuka and Kačarevo	Omoljica	—	—	—	—	—		
Pančevo: Hungarian in Ivanovo; Romanian in Banatsko Novo Selo; Bulgarian in Ivanovo; Macedonian in Jabuka and Kačarevo	Glogonj	—	—	Glogoni	—	—		
Pančevo: Hungarian in Ivanovo; Romanian in Banatsko Novo Selo; Bulgarian in Ivanovo; Macedonian in Jabuka and Kačarevo	Jabuka	—	—	Iabuca	—	—		
Pančevo: Hungarian in Ivanovo; Romanian in Banatsko Novo Selo; Bulgarian in Ivanovo; Macedonian in Jabuka and Kačarevo	Banatsko Novo Selo	—	—	Satu Nou	—	—		
Pančevo: Hungarian in Ivanovo; Romanian in Banatsko Novo Selo; Bulgarian in Ivanovo; Macedonian in Jabuka and Kačarevo	Ivanovo	—	—	—	—	—		
Pančevo: Hungarian in Ivanovo; Romanian in Banatsko Novo Selo; Bulgarian in Ivanovo; Macedonian in Jabuka and Kačarevo	Banatski Brestovac	—	—	—	—	—		
Pančevo: Hungarian in Ivanovo; Romanian in Banatsko Novo Selo; Bulgarian in Ivanovo; Macedonian in Jabuka and Kačarevo	Kačarevo	—	—	—	—	—		
Pančevo: Hungarian in Ivanovo; Romanian in Banatsko Novo Selo; Bulgarian in Ivanovo; Macedonian in Jabuka and Kačarevo	Starčevo	—	—	—	—	—		
Pećinci^{†}	Pećinci	—	—	—	—	—		
Ruma^{†}	Ruma	—	—	—	—	—		
Sečanj: Hungarian; Romanian	Sečanj	Szécsány	—	—	—	—		
Sečanj: Hungarian; Romanian	Sutjeska	Szárcsa	—	Sărcia	—	—		
Sečanj: Hungarian; Romanian	Banatska Dubica	Kismargita	—	—	—	—		
Sečanj: Hungarian; Romanian	Boka	Bóka	—	—	—	—		
Sečanj: Hungarian; Romanian	Busenje	Káptalanfalva	—	—	—	—		
Sečanj: Hungarian; Romanian	Jarkovac	Árkod	—	—	—	—		
Sečanj: Hungarian; Romanian	Jaša Tomić	Módos	—	—	—	—		
Sečanj: Hungarian; Romanian	Konak	Kanak	—	—	—	—		
Sečanj: Hungarian; Romanian	Krajišnik	Istvánfölde	—	—	—	—		
Sečanj: Hungarian; Romanian	Neuzina	Nezsény	—	—	—	—		
Sečanj: Hungarian; Romanian	Šurjan	Surján	—	—	—	—		
Sremska Mitrovica: In Stara Bingula: Slovak, Rusyn, and Croatian	Sremska Mitrovica	—	—	—	—	Srijemska Mitrovica		
Sremska Mitrovica: In Stara Bingula: Slovak, Rusyn, and Croatian	Stara Bingula	—	—	—	—	Stara Bingula		
Sremska Mitrovica: In Stara Bingula: Slovak, Rusyn, and Croatian	Bešenovački Prnjavor	—	—	—	—	—		
Sremska Mitrovica: In Stara Bingula: Slovak, Rusyn, and Croatian	Bešenovo	—	—	—	—	—		
Sremska Mitrovica: In Stara Bingula: Slovak, Rusyn, and Croatian	Bosut	—	—	—	—	—		
Sremska Mitrovica: In Stara Bingula: Slovak, Rusyn, and Croatian	Veliki Radinci	—	—	—	—	—		
Sremska Mitrovica: In Stara Bingula: Slovak, Rusyn, and Croatian	Grgurevci	—	—	—	—	—		
Sremska Mitrovica: In Stara Bingula: Slovak, Rusyn, and Croatian	Divoš	—	—	—	—	—		
Sremska Mitrovica: In Stara Bingula: Slovak, Rusyn, and Croatian	Zasavica 1	—	—	—	—	—		
Sremska Mitrovica: In Stara Bingula: Slovak, Rusyn, and Croatian	Zasavica 2	—	—	—	—	—		
Sremska Mitrovica: In Stara Bingula: Slovak, Rusyn, and Croatian	Jarak	—	—	—	—	—		
Sremska Mitrovica: In Stara Bingula: Slovak, Rusyn, and Croatian	Kuzmin	—	—	—	—	—		
Sremska Mitrovica: In Stara Bingula: Slovak, Rusyn, and Croatian	Laćarak	—	—	—	—	—		
Sremska Mitrovica: In Stara Bingula: Slovak, Rusyn, and Croatian	Ležimir	—	—	—	—	—		
Sremska Mitrovica: In Stara Bingula: Slovak, Rusyn, and Croatian	Manđelos	—	—	—	—	—		
Sremska Mitrovica: In Stara Bingula: Slovak, Rusyn, and Croatian	Martinci	—	—	—	—	—		
Sremska Mitrovica: In Stara Bingula: Slovak, Rusyn, and Croatian	Mačvanska Mitrovica	—	—	—	—	—		
Sremska Mitrovica: In Stara Bingula: Slovak, Rusyn, and Croatian	Noćaj	—	—	—	—	—		
Sremska Mitrovica: In Stara Bingula: Slovak, Rusyn, and Croatian	Ravnje	—	—	—	—	—		
Sremska Mitrovica: In Stara Bingula: Slovak, Rusyn, and Croatian	Radenković	—	—	—	—	—		
Sremska Mitrovica: In Stara Bingula: Slovak, Rusyn, and Croatian	Salaš Noćajski	—	—	—	—	—		
Sremska Mitrovica: In Stara Bingula: Slovak, Rusyn, and Croatian	Sremska Rača	—	—	—	—	—		
Sremska Mitrovica: In Stara Bingula: Slovak, Rusyn, and Croatian	Čalma	—	—	—	—	—		
Sremska Mitrovica: In Stara Bingula: Slovak, Rusyn, and Croatian	Šašinci	—	—	—	—	—		
Sremska Mitrovica: In Stara Bingula: Slovak, Rusyn, and Croatian	Šišatovac	—	—	—	—	—		
Sremska Mitrovica: In Stara Bingula: Slovak, Rusyn, and Croatian	Šuljam	—	—	—	—	—		
Žabalj: Rusyn	Žabalj	—	—	—	Жабель	—		
Žabalj: Rusyn	Čurug	—	—	—	Чурoґ	—		
Žabalj: Rusyn	Đurđevo	—	—	—	Дюрдьов	—	1853 Gjurgjevo, 1881 St. Gyorgy, and from 1922 Đurđevo	Georgijevo (1800, orig. name)
Žabalj: Rusyn	Gospođinci	—	—	—	Ґосподїнци	—		
Sremski Karlovci^{†}	Sremski Karlovci	—	—	—	—	—		
Stara Pazova: Slovak in Stara Pazova	Stara Pazova	—	Stará Pazova	—	—	—		
Stara Pazova: Slovak in Stara Pazova	Belegiš	—	—	—	—	—		
Stara Pazova: Slovak in Stara Pazova	Vojka	—	—	—	—	—		
Stara Pazova: Slovak in Stara Pazova	Golubinci	—	—	—	—	—		
Stara Pazova: Slovak in Stara Pazova	Krnješevci	—	—	—	—	—		
Stara Pazova: Slovak in Stara Pazova	Nova Pazova	—	—	—	—	—		
Stara Pazova: Slovak in Stara Pazova	Novi Banovci	—	—	—	—	—		
Stara Pazova: Slovak in Stara Pazova	Stari Banovci	—	—	—	—	—		
Stara Pazova: Slovak in Stara Pazova	Surduk	—	—	—	—	—		
Šid: Slovak; Rusyn; Croatian in Sot, Batrovci, and Ljuba	Šid	—	Šíd	—	Шид	Šid		
Šid: Slovak; Rusyn; Croatian in Sot, Batrovci, and Ljuba	Adaševci	—	—	—	Адашевци	—		
Šid: Slovak; Rusyn; Croatian in Sot, Batrovci, and Ljuba	Bačinci	—	—	—	Бачинци	—		
Šid: Slovak; Rusyn; Croatian in Sot, Batrovci, and Ljuba	Batrovci	—	—	—	Батровци	—		
Šid: Slovak; Rusyn; Croatian in Sot, Batrovci, and Ljuba	Berkasovo	—	—	—	Беркасово	—		
Šid: Slovak; Rusyn; Croatian in Sot, Batrovci, and Ljuba	Erdevik	—	Erdevík	—	Ердевик	—		
Šid: Slovak; Rusyn; Croatian in Sot, Batrovci, and Ljuba	Ljuba	—	L'uba	—	Люба	—		
Šid: Slovak; Rusyn; Croatian in Sot, Batrovci, and Ljuba	Bikić Do	—	—	—	Бикич	—		
Šid: Slovak; Rusyn; Croatian in Sot, Batrovci, and Ljuba	Bingula	—	—	—	Бинґула	—		
Šid: Slovak; Rusyn; Croatian in Sot, Batrovci, and Ljuba	Vašica	—	—	—	Вашица	—		
Šid: Slovak; Rusyn; Croatian in Sot, Batrovci, and Ljuba	Višnjićevo	—	—	—	Вишнїчево	—		
Šid: Slovak; Rusyn; Croatian in Sot, Batrovci, and Ljuba	Gibarac	—	—	—	Ґибарац	—		
Šid: Slovak; Rusyn; Croatian in Sot, Batrovci, and Ljuba	Ilinci	—	—	—	Илинци	—		
Šid: Slovak; Rusyn; Croatian in Sot, Batrovci, and Ljuba	Jamena	—	—	—	Ямена	—		
Šid: Slovak; Rusyn; Croatian in Sot, Batrovci, and Ljuba	Kukujevci	—	—	—	Куковци	—		
Šid: Slovak; Rusyn; Croatian in Sot, Batrovci, and Ljuba	Molovin	—	—	—	Моловин	—		
Šid: Slovak; Rusyn; Croatian in Sot, Batrovci, and Ljuba	Morović	—	—	—	Морович	—		
Šid: Slovak; Rusyn; Croatian in Sot, Batrovci, and Ljuba	Privina Glava	—	—	—	Привина Глава	—		
Šid: Slovak; Rusyn; Croatian in Sot, Batrovci, and Ljuba	Sot	—	—	—	Сот	Sot		

== See also ==
- Languages of Vojvodina
- Ethnic groups in Vojvodina
