= Neđeljko Konjokrad =

Serbian politician (born 1964)

Neđeljko Konjokrad (Serbian Cyrillic: Неђељко Коњокрад; born 1964) is a politician in Serbia. He served in the Assembly of Vojvodina from 2008 to 2020, originally with the Democratic Party (Demokratska stranka, DS) and subsequently with the Serbian Progressive Party (Srpska napredna stranka, SNS). He is now the president (i.e., speaker) of the municipal assembly of Alibunar.

== Private career ==
Konjokrad is an entrepreneur. He lives in the community of Ilandža in Alibunar.

== Politician ==
=== Assembly of Vojvodina ===
Konjokrad was elected to the provincial assembly for the Alibunar constituency seat as a DS candidate in the 2008 and 2012 provincial elections, in each instance in the second round of voting. The DS and its allies won both elections, and Konjokrad was a government supporter while he was a member of the party. On 2 June 2014, he left the DS to join the SNS.

Vojvodina switched to a system of full proportional representation prior to the 2016 provincial election. Konjokrad appeared on the forty-fourth position on the Progressive Party's Aleksandar Vučić – Serbia Is Winning electoral list and was re-elected when the list won a majority victory with sixty-three out of 120 mandates. He again served as a government supporter for the next four years and did not seek re-election at the provincial level in 2020.

=== Municipal politics ===
Konjokrad has also served in the Alibunar municipal assembly. He received the fifth position on the Progressive Party's list for the 2016 local election in Alibunar and was elected when the list won a narrow majority victory with twelve out of twenty-three mandates. He was chosen as president of the assembly on 13 July 2018.

He was given the fifteenth position on the Progressive list in the 2020 local election and was narrowly re-elected when the list won sixteen mandates. After the election, he was appointed to another term as assembly president.

== Electoral record ==
=== Provincial (Vojvodina) ===
2012 Vojvodina assembly election Alibunar (constituency seat) - First and Second Rounds
Neđeljko Konjokrad "Meda" (incumbent)	Choice for a Better Vojvodina (Affiliation: Democratic Party)	3,671	34.42	5,406	58.06
Milan Ćuruvija	Socialist Party of Serbia	2,826	26.50	3,905	41.94
Zoran Maksimović "Šuca"	Let's Get Vojvodina Moving	1,180	11.06		
Aurel Murgu	League of Social Democrats of Vojvodina	1,164	10.91		
Dušan Dakić	Serbian Radical Party	709	6.65		
Sergije Simonović	Democratic Party of Serbia	698	6.54		
Viorel Žura	United Regions of Serbia–Mlađan Dinkić	418	3.92		
Total valid votes		10,666	100	9,311	100

2008 Vojvodina assembly election Alibunar (constituency seat) - First and Second Rounds
Neđeljko Konjokrad "Meda"	For a European Vojvodina: Democratic Party–G17 Plus, Boris Tadić (Affiliation: Democratic Party)	3,386	29.87	4,511	52.51
Milan Ćuruvija	Citizens' Group: Milan Ćuruvija	2,939	25.92	4,079	48.49
Nelu Ardeljan	Together for Vojvodina	1,319	11.63		
Marina Nikolaje	Liberal Democratic Party	1,124	9.91		
Zlatan Vujnović "Pale"	Democratic Party of Serbia–New Serbia	916	8.08		
Dragomir Čukić	Serbian Radical Party	664	5.86		
Boško Cvetić	Socialist Party of Serbia–Party of United Pensioners of Serbia	386	3.40		
Milivoj Petrović "Masni"	Citizens' Group: Milivoj Petrović	345	3.04		
Novica Radojčin	Citizens' Group: Novica Radojčin	258	2.28		
Total valid votes		11,337	100	8,590	100
Invalid ballots		574		277	
Total votes casts		11,911	60.52	8,867	44.64
