= Tanja Dokmanović =

Serbian politician

Tanja Dokmanović (Serbian Cyrillic: Тања Докмановић; born 1976) is a politician in Serbia. She served in the Assembly of Vojvodina from 2012 to 2016, originally as a member of the Democratic Party and later as a member of the breakaway Social Democratic Party. She is now a member of the Serbian Progressive Party.

== Early life and private career ==
Dokmanović was born in Vršac, in what was then the Socialist Autonomous Province of Vojvodina in the Socialist Republic of Serbia, Socialist Federal Republic of Yugoslavia. She graduated from a secondary economics school in nearby Alibunar and from the higher school of managers and business secretaries in Sremski Karlovci. She has worked for a variety of non-governmental organizations, was employed by the Vršac municipal government from 2000 to 2004, and was a journalist for Blic from 2004 to 2007. Dokmanović worked for the development fund of Vojvodina from 2008 to 2010 and was assistant to the mayor of New Belgrade

== Political career ==
Dokmanović was a candidate for the Vojvodina Assembly in the 2008 provincial election, in which she received the twenty-third position on the Democratic Party's For a European Vojvodina electoral list. At this time, half of the seats in the Vojvodina assembly were determined by single-member constituency elections and the other half by proportional representation via electoral lists. The mandates for the proportional seats were distributed at the discretion of the sponsoring parties, rather than in numerical order – and the For a European Vojvodina list was, in any event, mostly alphabetical. The list won twenty-three seats, but Dokmanović was not selected for a mandate.

Vojvodina's electoral system was reformed for the 2012 provincial election, such that mandates for the proportional seats were awarded in numerical order to candidates on successful lists. Dokmanović received the eighteenth position on the Democratic Party's Choice for a Better Vojvodina list. The list won sixteen seats; she was not initially elected but received a mandate prior to the first meeting of the assembly when two candidates higher on the list declined to serve. The Democratic Party and its allies won the election, and Dokmanović initially served as a government supporter.

The Democratic Party experienced a serious split in early 2014, when former leader Boris Tadić established a breakaway group called the New Democratic Party. Dokmanović sided with Tadić in the split and was a founding member of the new party's parliamentary group in March 2014. The party renamed itself as the Social Democratic Party later in the year and ultimately moved to the opposition side in the Vojvodina assembly.

Vojvodina's electoral system was again reformed for the 2016 provincial election, such that all seats were determined by proportional representation. The Social Democratic Party contested the election in an alliance with the Liberal Democratic Party. Dokmanović received the ninth position on their combined list, which did not cross the electoral threshold to win representation in the assembly. She also received the forty-eighth position on a combined list of the Social Democratic Party, the Liberal Democratic Party, and the League of Social Democrats of Vojvodina in the concurrent 2016 Serbian parliamentary election. This was too low a position for election to be a realistic prospect, and she was not elected when the list won only thirteen mandates.
