= Languages of Serbia =

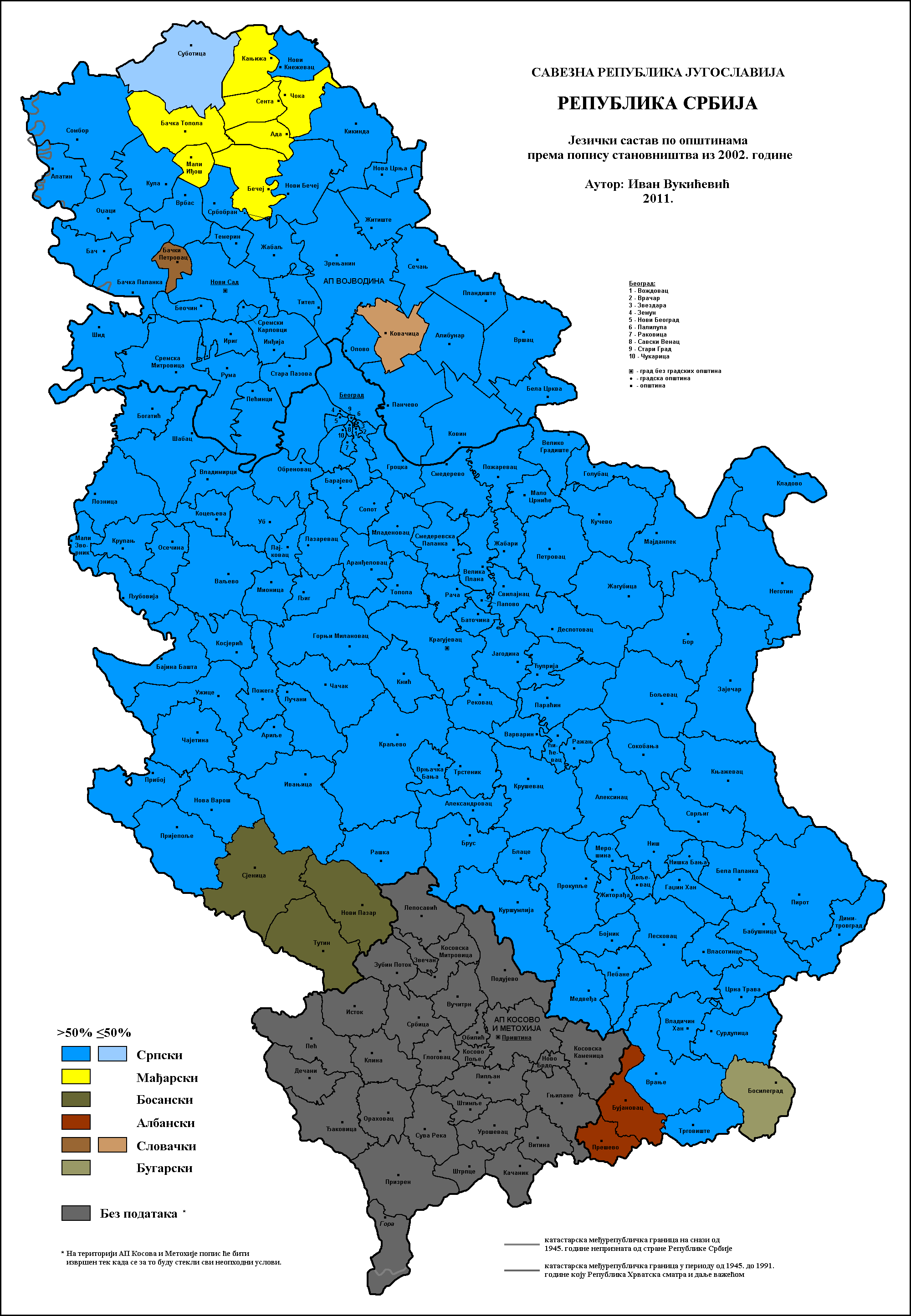
- Linguistic map of Serbia
- Official: Serbian
- Minority: Hungarian, Bosnian, Romani, Albanian, Slovak, Romanian, Vlach, Croatian, Rusyn, Macedonian, Bulgarian, Montenegrin, Czech, Bunjevac
- Signed: Yugoslav Sign Language
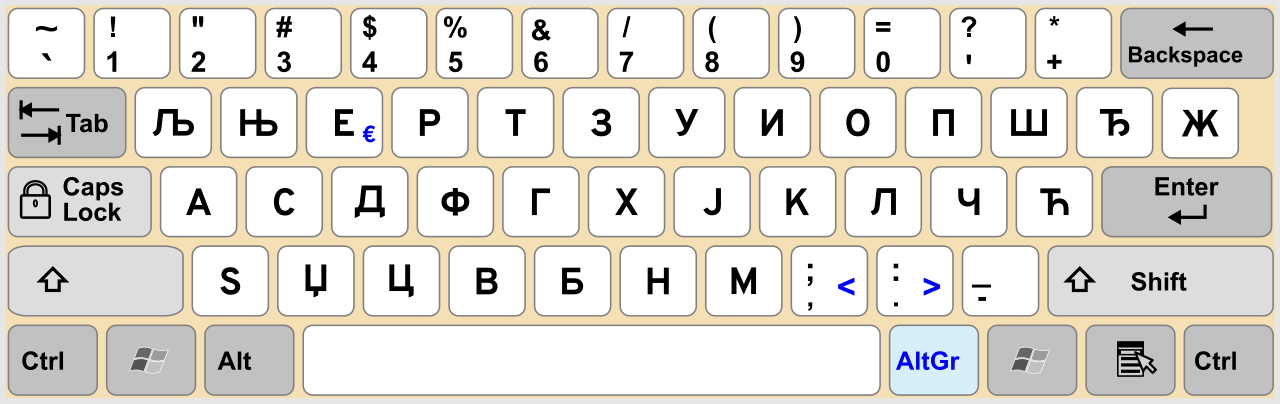
- Keyboard layout: South Slavic Latin and Serbian Cyrillic

The languages spoken in Serbia include official language, recognized minority languages, and other languages.

The official language of Serbia is Serbian. There are more than a dozen recognized minority languages, mainly spoken by the country’s ethnic minorities. Other languages have no official status and are largely spoken by immigrant communities.

== Serbian language ==
The Serbian language predominates in most of Serbia and is a mother tongue of 84.4% of the country's population, including almost all ethnic Serbs and majority of ethnic Croats, Macedonians, Montenegrins, ethnic Muslims as well as over third of ethnic Roma and Bulgarians.

Serbian is based on the most widespread dialect of Serbo-Croatian, Shtokavian (more specifically on the sub-dialects of Šumadija-Vojvodina and Eastern Herzegovina). The other dialect of Serbian is Torlakian, spoken in southeastern Serbia.

== Recognized minority languages ==
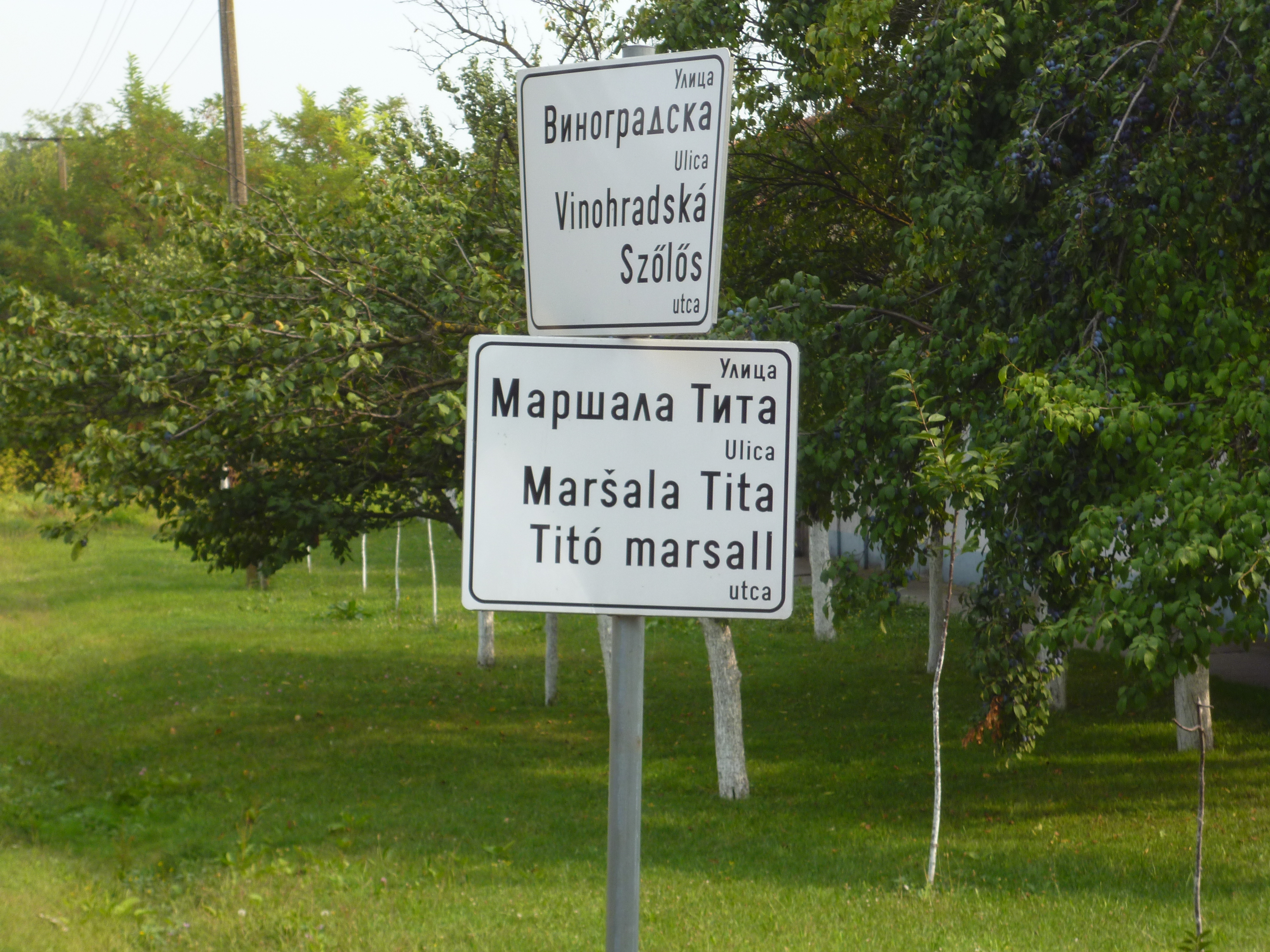
Street name sign, in Serbian, Slovak, and Hungarian languages, in the village of Belo Blato (administrative area of the City of Zrenjanin).

There are 14 recognized minority languages in Serbia: Hungarian (native language to 2.5% of population), Bosnian (2.2%), Romani (1.2%), Albanian (1%), Slovak (0.6%), Romanian (0.3%), Vlach (0.3%), Croatian (0.2%), Rusyn (0.1%), Macedonian (0.1%), Bulgarian (0.1%), Montenegrin, Bunjevac, and Czech. Bosnian, Croatian, Montenegrin, and Bunjevac are practically indistinguishable from Serbian, whereas the Bulgarian spoken in Serbia is in the form of the Torlakian dialect, considered transitional between Bulgarian and Serbian.

Recognized minority languages are in official use in municipalities and cities (54 in total) where share of respective ethnic minority in total population is more than 15%. Additionally, five minority languages (Hungarian, Slovak, Romanian, Croatian, and Rusyn) are in the official use by the provincial administration in Vojvodina. History of affirmation of multi-cultural and multi-lingual provincial identity in Vojvodina led to comparatively high level of protection of minority languages in the region compared to Central Serbia and many other parts of Europe.

Complete education cycle in minority languages, from preschool to university level, is available in following languages: Hungarian, Bosnian, Albanian, Slovak, Romanian, Croatian, Bulgarian, and Rusyn. Furthermore, seven more minority languages are taught as part of the subject "Mother Tongue with Elements of Ethnic Culture": Romani, Vlach, Macedonian, Bunjevac, German, Ukrainian, and Czech. As of 2025, some 6% of total number of students (60,000 out of 992,000) attend classes in recognized minority languages at all levels of education, from preschool to university level.

The right to information in minority languages is realized through print and electronic media. Newspapers, magazines, and other publications are issued in minority languages, while radio and television stations broadcast programs in those languages.

The European Charter for Regional or Minority Languages was ratified by Serbia and Montenegro in 2005. Serbia, as the successor state, continues to be bound by the Charter obligations.

== Other languages ==
Other languages have no official status and are largely spoken by immigrant communities. Russian is most widely spoken of these, native to 0.1% of the total population. Besides Russian, there is a certain presence of Chinese and Arabic.

== See also ==
- Languages of Vojvodina
- Romanian language in Serbia
