= Languages of Vojvodina =

1. Serbian (76.4%)
2. Hungarian (9.73%)
3. Slovak (2.12%)
4. Romani (1.31%)
5. Romanian (1.03%)
6. Croatian (0.53%)
7. Other (2.13%)
8. Undeclared (2.40%)
9. Unknown (4.30%)

Languages spoken in the Serbian province of Vojvodina include South Slavic languages (Serbian, Croatian, Macedonian, Montenegrin, Bunjevac (Note: Bunjevac is a sub-dialect of Shtokavian, the prestige dialect of the pluricentric Serbo-Croatian language, which Croatian and Serbian are also standardized varieties of. Although officially recognized as separate languages, they are fully mutually intelligible and linguistically constitute a single language.)), West Slavic languages (Slovak, Pannonian Rusyn), Hungarian, Romanian, Romani, and others.

== History ==
It is unknown which languages were spoken in the territory of present-day Vojvodina in Paleolithic and Neolithic times. First speakers of Indo-European languages arrived here in 4200 BC and since the first written traces about this region appeared, there are records about speakers of various Indo-European languages that lived in this area, including speakers of Thracian, Illyrian, Celtic, Iranian and Italic branches of Indo-European language family. The decline and fall of the Roman Empire brought to this area speakers of Turkic and Germanic languages as well. Speakers of South Slavic languages (Serbian and Croatian) settled in the area in the 7th century, while speakers of Hungarian appeared in the 9th century. Ottoman conquest of the region in the 16th century brought to this area speakers of Turkish, Romani, and other languages, while Habsburg conquest in the end of the 17th and first half of the 18th century brought here the speakers of German, Slovak, Rusyn, Czech, Ukrainian, and other languages. In recent years, there is an increasing number of speakers of Chinese language as well.

== Recognized minority languages ==
Besides Serbian, which is the official language in the whole country, there are five recognized minority languages in the official use by the provincial administration in Vojvodina: Hungarian, Romanian, Slovak, Rusyn, and Croatian. Additionally, Hungarian language is in official use in 29 cities and municipalities, Slovak in 12, Romanian in 9, Rusyn in 6, and Croatian and Czech in 1 city each.

Radio Television of Vojvodina, the public broadcaster in the province, broadcasts programme in 10 languages: Serbian, Hungarian, Slovak, Rusyn, Romanian, Bunjevac, Ukrainian, Romani, Croatian, and Macedonian.

== Gallery ==
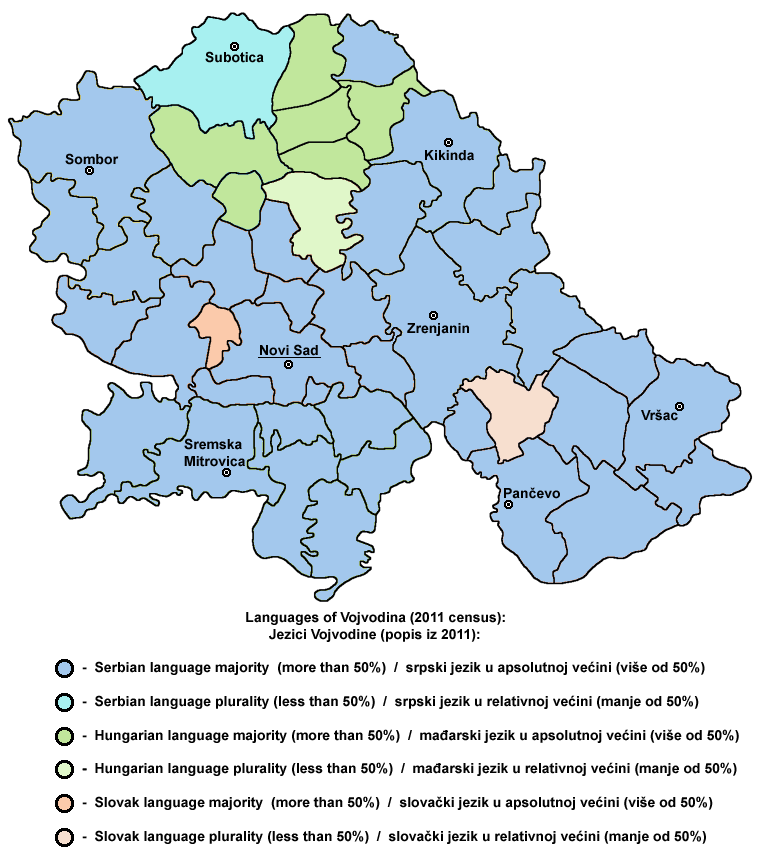
Language map by cities and municipalities, 2011

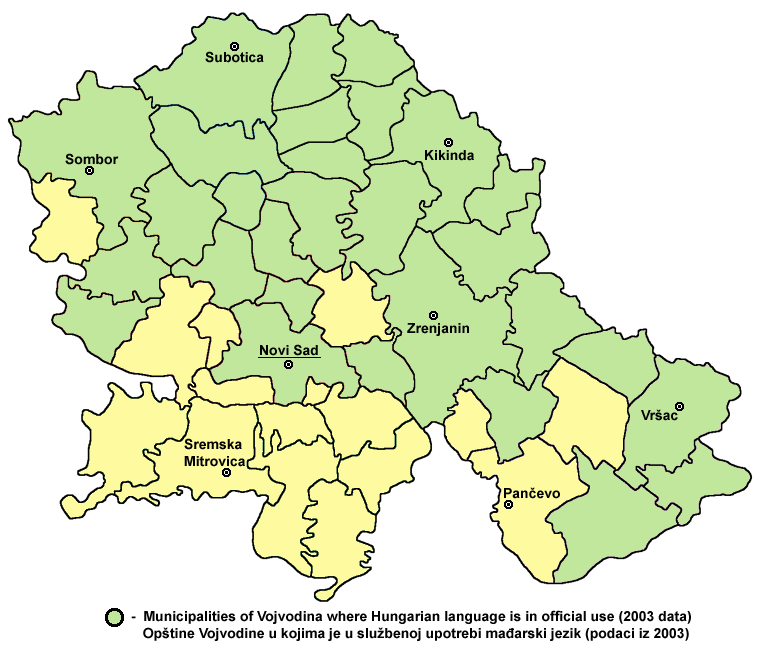
Official usage of Hungarian by cities and municipalities

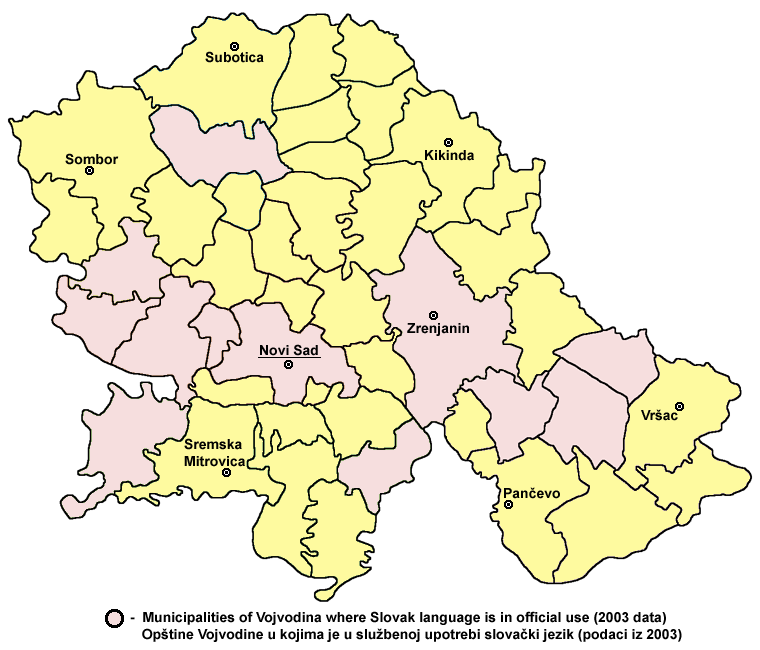
Official usage of Slovak by cities and municipalities

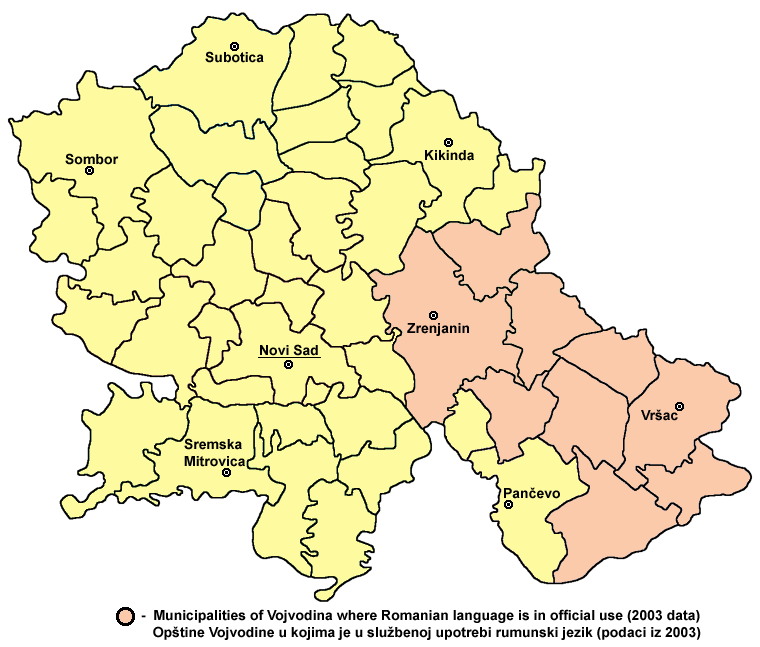
Official usage of Romanian by cities and municipalities

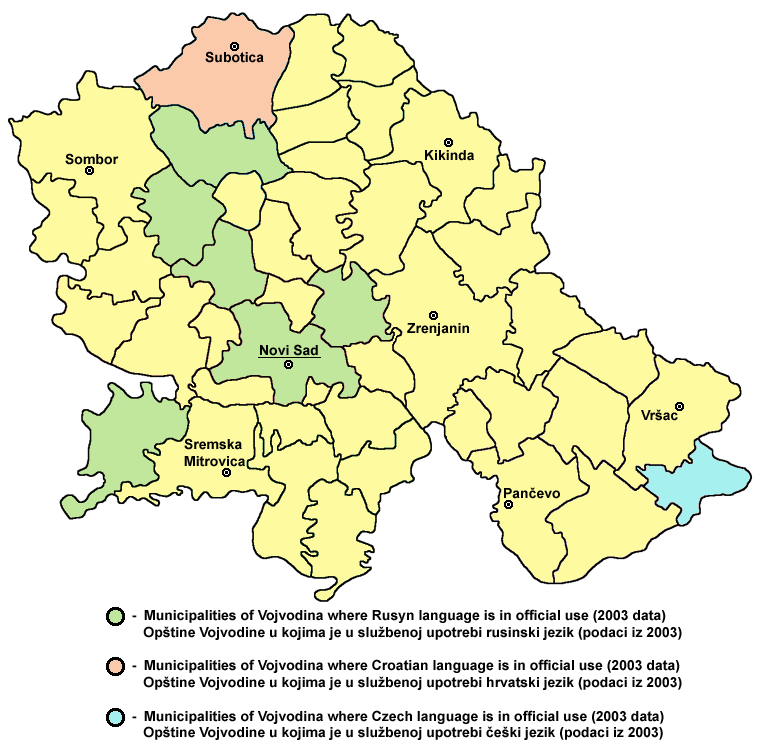
Official usage of Croatian, Rusyn, and Czech by cities and municipalities

== See also ==
- Languages of Serbia
- List of placenames in Vojvodina in different languages
