= Lokve, Alibunar =

Lokve Локве (Serbian) Sân-Mihai / Simiai (Romanian)
- Village (Selo)
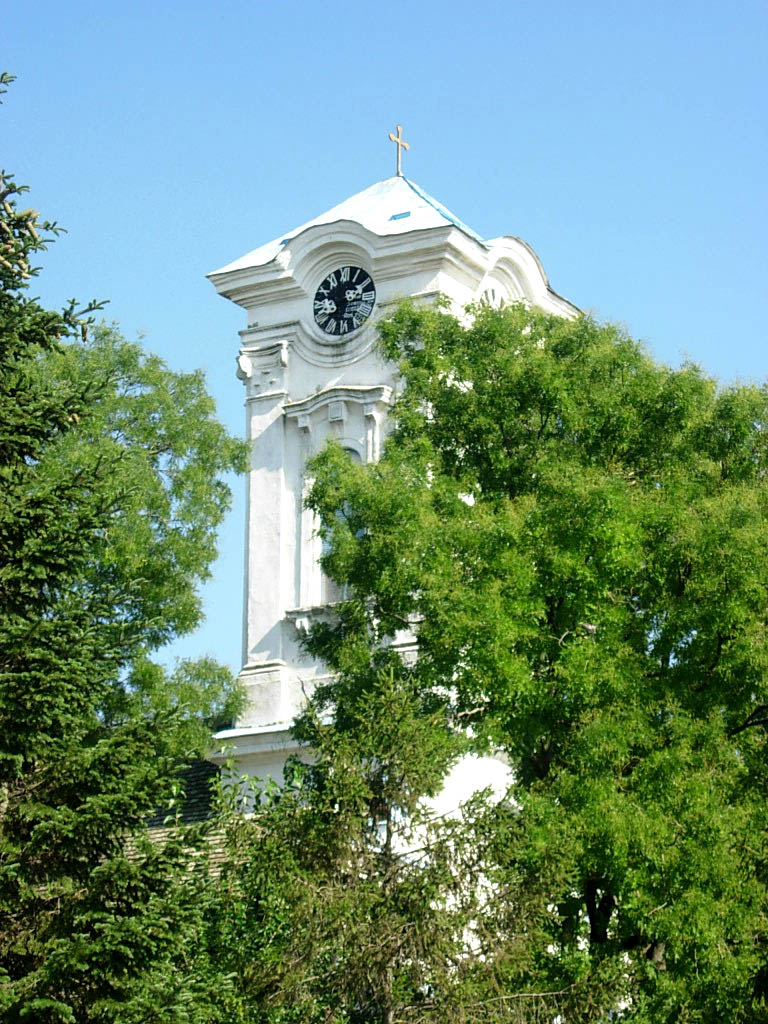
- The Romanian Orthodox church

- Location of Lokve within Serbia Lokve (Serbia) Lokve (Europe)
- Coordinates: 45°09′06″N 21°01′31″E
- Country: Serbia
- Province: Vojvodina
- District: South Banat
- Municipality: Alibunar

Government
  - Mayor: Darian Tapalaga

Area
  - Lokve: 1.1925 km^{2} (0.4604 sq mi)
- Elevation: 76 m (249 ft)

Population (2022)
  - Lokve: 1,508
  - Density: 1,265/km^{2} (3,275/sq mi)
- Time zone: UTC+1 (CET)
  - Summer (DST): UTC+2 (CEST)
- Postal code: 26361
- Area code: +381(0)13
- Car plates: PA

Lokve (Serbian Cyrillic: Локве, Romanian: Locve, Sân-Mihai or Simiai) is a village located in the Alibunar municipality, South Banat District, Vojvodina, Serbia. The village has a population of 1,508 people (2022 census).

== Name ==
In Serbian, the village is known as Lokve (Локве), in Romanian as Sân-Mihai or Simiai, and in Hungarian as Végszentmihály. The town name was changed from Saint Michael when the town was invaded by the Nazi military forces during World War II.

== Demographics ==
=== Historical population ===
- 1961: 4,243
- 1971: 3,826
- 1981: 3,511
- 1991: 2,450
- 2002: 2,002
- 2022: 1,508

=== Ethnic groups ===
According to data from the 2022 census, ethnic groups in the village include:

- 1,206 (80%) Romanians
- 179 (11.9%) Roma
- 40 (2.6%) Serbs
- Others/Undeclared/Unknown

== Notable people ==
- Lazăr Sfera (1909–1992), football player

== See also ==
- List of places in Serbia
- List of cities, towns and villages in Vojvodina

== Sources ==
- Slobodan Ćurčić, Broj stanovnika Vojvodine, Novi Sad, 1996.
- Republika Srbija, Republički zavod za statistiku, Popis stanovništva, domaćinstava i stanova u 2002, Stanovništvo 1, Nacionalna ili etnička pripadnost - podaci po naseljima, Beograd, Februar 2003.
- Na temeljima gde je prvobitno bilo smešteno naselje pronađeni su praistorijski predmeti i jedan srebrni denar iz doba kralja Domicijana (51 - 96. pre n.e.). U ataru susednog sela Janošik pronađeni su temelji kuće iz doba Rimljana i kraljevski novac. Prilikom iskopa temelja Crkve u Alibunaru pronađen je novac sa amblemom Rima i natpisom Vibius, Tribarianus, Gallus.
