= Nikolinci =

Nikolinci Николинци (Serbian) Nicolinț (Romanian)
- Village (Selo)
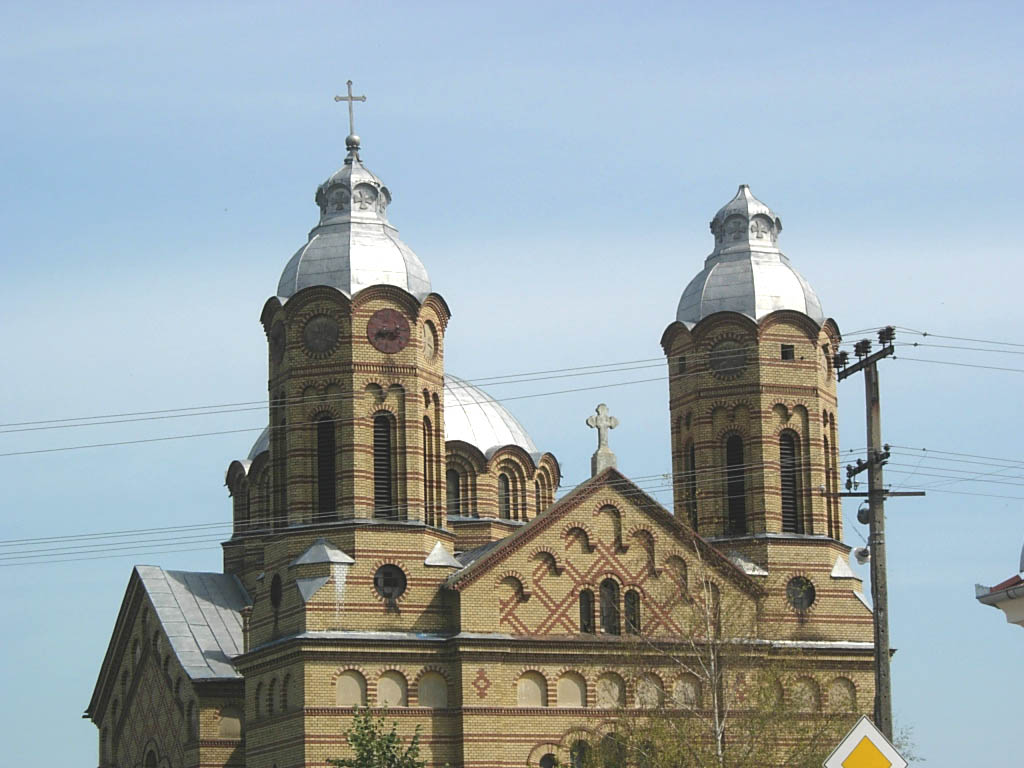
- The Romanian Orthodox church

- Location of Nikolinci within Serbia Nikolinci (Serbia) Nikolinci (Europe)
- Coordinates: 45°02′35″N 21°04′01″E
- Country: Serbia
- Province: Vojvodina
- District: South Banat
- Municipality: Alibunar
- Elevation: 92 m (302 ft)

Population (2022)
  - Nikolinci: 990
- Time zone: UTC+1 (CET)
  - Summer (DST): UTC+2 (CEST)
- Postal code: 26322
- Area code: +381(0)13
- Car plates: PA

Nikolinci (Serbian Cyrillic: Николинци, Romanian: Nicolinț) is a village located in the Alibunar municipality, South Banat District, Vojvodina, Serbia. The village has a population of 990 (2022 census).

== Name ==
In Serbian, the village is known as Nikolinci (Николинци), in Romanian as Nicolinț, in Hungarian as Temesmiklós, and in German as Nikolinzi.

== Demographics ==
=== Historical population ===
- 1961: 2,716
- 1971: 2,377
- 1981: 1,905
- 1991: 1,634
- 2002: 1,240
- 2011: 1,131
- 2022: 990

=== Ethnic groups ===
According to data from the 2022 census, ethnic groups in the village include:

- 558 (56.3%) Romanians
- 176 (17.7%) Roma
- 152 (15.3%) Serbs
- Others/Undeclared/Unknown

== See also ==
- List of places in Serbia
- List of cities, towns and villages in Vojvodina
