= Janošik =

Janošik Јаношик (Serbian) Jánošík (Slovak)
- Village (Selo)
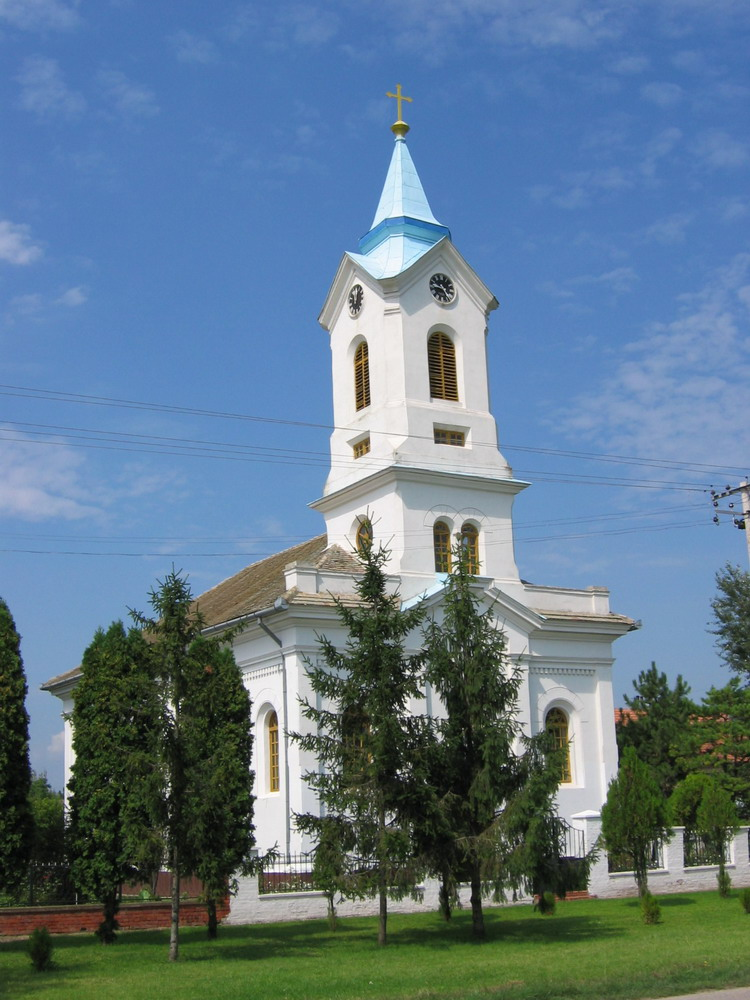
- Slovak Evangelical Lutheran Church

- Location of Janošik within Serbia Janošik (Serbia) Janošik (Europe)
- Coordinates: 45°10′50″N 21°00′56″E
- Country: Serbia
- Province: Vojvodina
- District: South Banat
- Municipality: Alibunar
- Elevation: 75 m (246 ft)

Population (2022)
  - Janošik: 681
- Time zone: UTC+1 (CET)
  - Summer (DST): UTC+2 (CEST)
- Postal code: 26362
- Area code: +381(0)13
- Car plates: PA

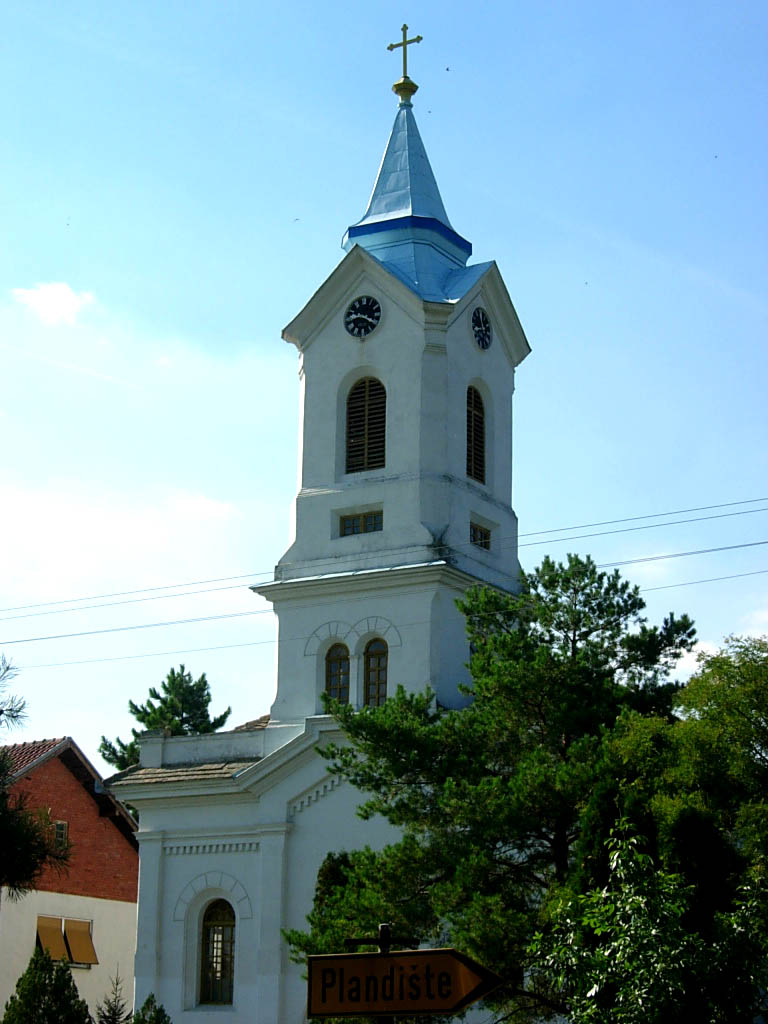
The Lutheran (Slovak) church

Janošik (Serbian Cyrillic: Јаношик, Slovak: Jánošík) is a village located in the municipality of Alibunar, South Banat District, Vojvodina, Serbia. The village has population of 681 people (2022 census).

== Name ==
The modern name of the village is of Slovak origin. The historical Serbian name of the village was Aleksandrovac (Александровац), i.e. "the place of Aleksandar / Alexander" and the meaning of this name is also reflected in Hungarian name version Újsándorfalva, which means "(new) village of Alexander". Another Serbian name used for the village was Slovački Aleksandrovac (Словачки Александровац), i.e. "Slovak Aleksandrovac".

== History ==
The village was founded in 1812 by Hungarian Count Fülöp Sándor de Szlavnicza and was named after him as Újsándorfalva.

== Demographics ==
=== Historical population ===
- 1961: 1,467
- 1971: 1,488
- 1981: 1,372
- 1991: 1,225
- 2011: 1,171
- 2022: 681

=== Ethnic groups ===
According to data from the 2022 census, ethnic groups in the village include:

- 580 (85.1%) Slovaks
- 532 (5.7%) Serbs
- Others/Undeclared/Unknown

== Notable residents ==
- The village is the birthplace of the Slovak Lutheran theologian and writer Alexander Jaroši (1897–1944).

== See also ==
- List of places in Serbia
- List of cities, towns and villages in Vojvodina
