= Novi Kozjak =

Novi Kozjak Нови Козјак
- Village (Selo)
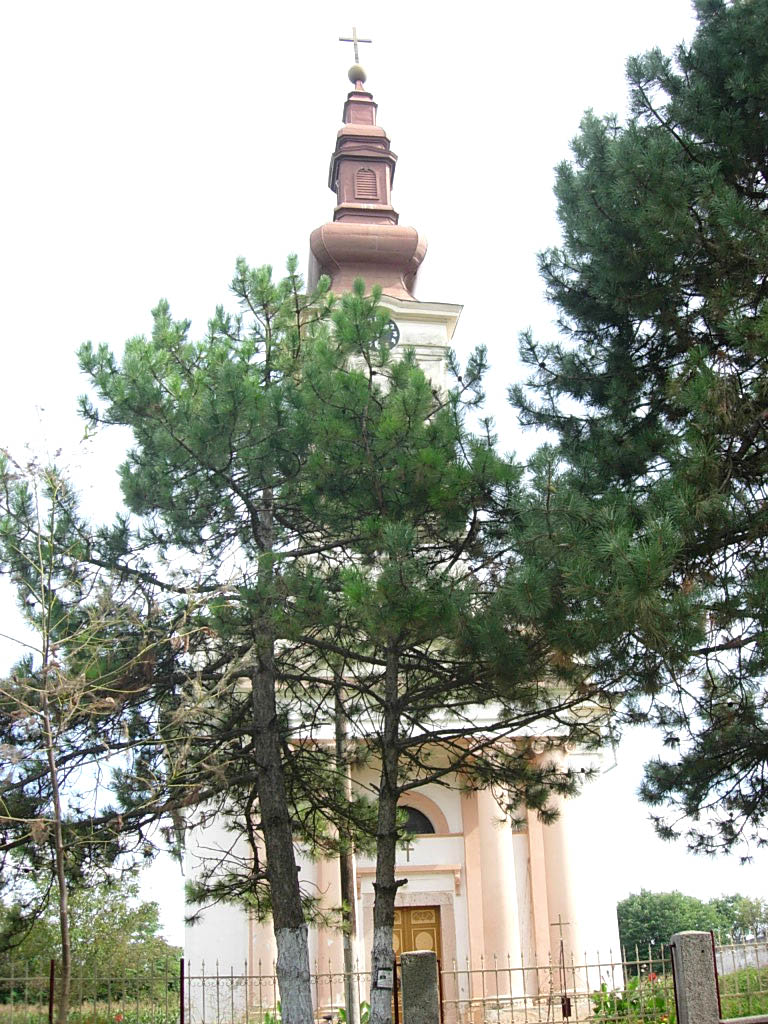
- The Orthodox church

- Location of Novi Kozjak within Serbia Novi Kozjak (Serbia) Novi Kozjak (Europe)
- Coordinates: 45°11′02″N 20°51′32″E
- Country: Serbia
- Province: Vojvodina
- District: South Banat
- Municipality: Alibunar
- Established: May 1, 1818

Area
  - Novi Kozjak: 31.4 km^{2} (12.1 sq mi)

Population (2002)
  - Novi Kozjak: 650
  - Density: 21/km^{2} (54/sq mi)
- Time zone: UTC+1 (CET)
  - Summer (DST): UTC+2 (CEST)
- Postal code: 26353
- Area code: +381(0)13
- Car plates: PA

Novi Kozjak (Serbian Cyrillic: Нови Козјак) is a village in northern Serbia. It is situated in the Alibunar municipality, in the South Banat District, Vojvodina province. The village has a Serb ethnic majority (90.49%) and a population of 650 people (2011 census).

== Name ==
In Serbian, the village is known as Novi Kozjak (Нови Козјак), in Hungarian as Ferdinándfalva, and in German as Ferdinandsdorf.

Until 1947, the official name of the village was Ferdin, which is still in use by many inhabitants. The name Novi Kozjak was given in memory of a village of that name destroyed during the Second World War, which was named after the Kozjak mountain in North Macedonia.

Historical population
| Year | Pop. | ±% |
|---|---|---|
| 1961 | 1,428 | — |
| 1971 | 1,281 | −10.3% |
| 1981 | 1,170 | −8.7% |
| 1991 | 997 | −14.8% |
| 2002 | 768 | −23.0% |
| 2011 | 650 | −15.4% |

== See also ==
- List of places in Serbia
- List of cities, towns and villages in Vojvodina
