= Dobrica =

Dobrica Добрица
- Village (Selo)
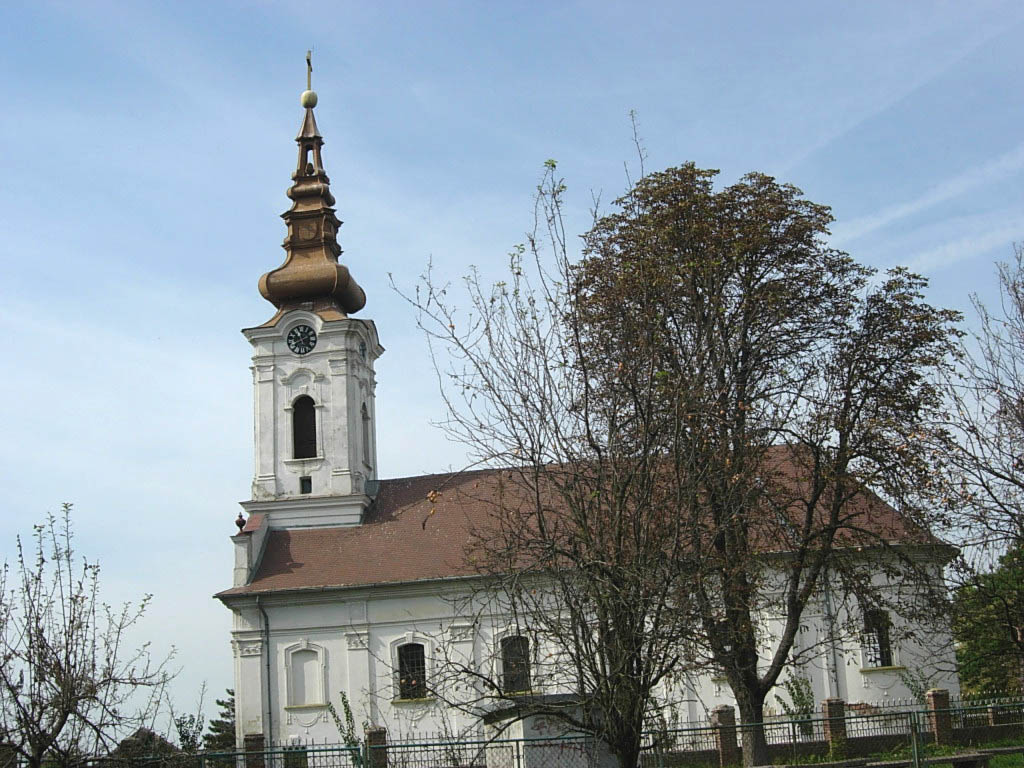
- The Orthodox church

- Location of Dobrica within Serbia Dobrica (Serbia) Dobrica (Europe)
- Coordinates: 45°13′N 20°51′E
- Country: Serbia
- Province: Vojvodina
- District: South Banat
- Municipality: Alibunar
- Elevation: 57 m (187 ft)

Population (2002)
  - Dobrica: 1,344
- Time zone: UTC+1 (CET)
  - Summer (DST): UTC+2 (CEST)
- Postal code: 26354
- Area code: +381(0)13
- Car plates: PA

Dobrica (Serbian Cyrillic: Добрица) is a village in Serbia. It is situated in the Alibunar municipality, in the South Banat District, Vojvodina province. The village has a Serb ethnic majority and a population of 1,344 people according to the 2002 census.

== Name ==
In Serbian, the village is known as Dobrica (Добрица), in German as Dobritza, and in Hungarian as Kevedobra. Name of the village is of Serbian origin and it derived from Serbian word "dobro" ("good" in English).

== Historical population ==
Historical population
Year	Pop.	±%
1961	2,617	—
1971	2,376	−9.2%
1981	2,006	−15.6%
1991	1,621	−19.2%
2002	1,344	−17.1%

== See also ==
- List of places in Serbia
- List of cities, towns and villages in Vojvodina
