= Ilandža =

Ilandža Иланџа
- Village (Selo)
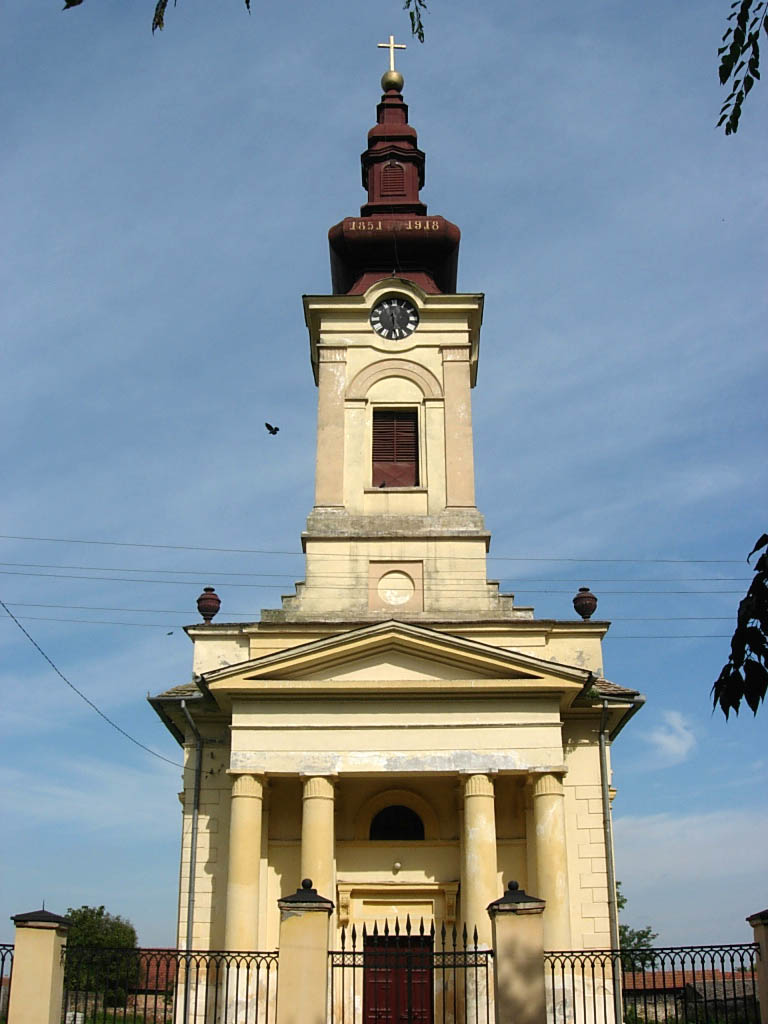
- The Orthodox church

- Location of Ilandža within Serbia Ilandža (Serbia) Ilandža (Europe)
- Coordinates: 45°10′06″N 20°55′06″E
- Country: Serbia
- Province: Vojvodina
- District: South Banat
- Municipality: Alibunar
- Elevation: 59 m (194 ft)

Population (2002)
  - Ilandža: 1,727
- Time zone: UTC+1 (CET)
  - Summer (DST): UTC+2 (CEST)
- Postal code: 26352
- Area code: +381(0)13
- Car plates: PA

Ilandža (Serbian Cyrillic: Иланџа) is a village in Serbia. It is situated in the Alibunar municipality, in the South Banat District, Vojvodina province. The village has a Serb ethnic majority and a population of 1,727 according to the 2002 census.

== Name ==
In Serbian, the village is known as Ilandža (Иланџа), in Romanian as Ilangea, in Hungarian as Ilonc, in Croatian as Ilandža, and in German as Ilandscha or Ilantsch.

== Historical population ==
Historical population
| Year | Pop. | ±% |
|---|---|---|
| 1961 | 2,926 | — |
| 1971 | 2,805 | −4.1% |
| 1981 | 2,426 | −13.5% |
| 1991 | 2,023 | −16.6% |

== Notable residents ==
- Famous Serbian poet and writer Miloš Crnjanski lived here in his youth.

== See also ==
- List of places in Serbia
- List of cities, towns and villages in Vojvodina
