= Alibunar =

Alibunar Алибунар (Serbian) Alibunar (Romanian) Alibunar (Slovak)
- Town and municipality
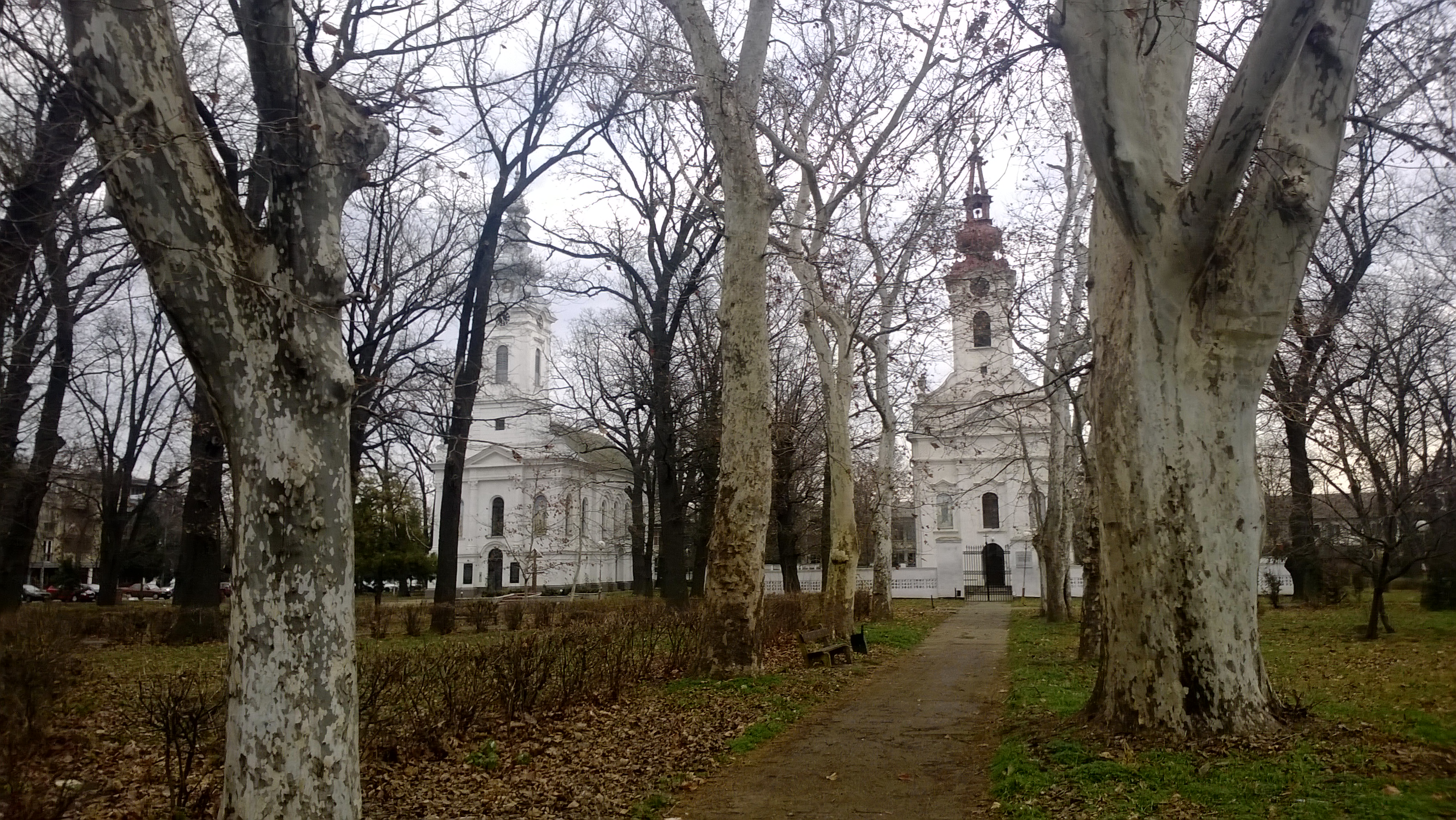
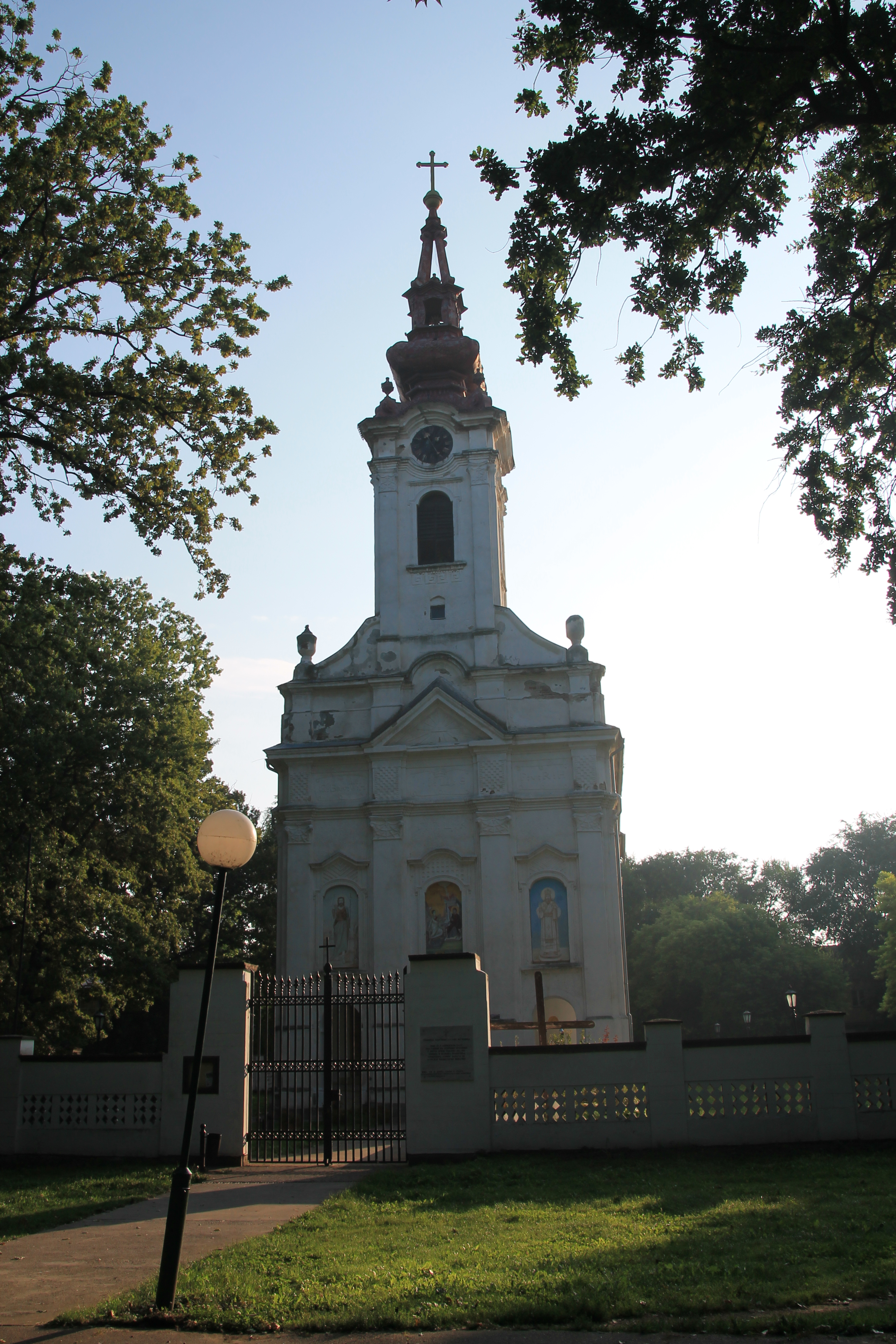
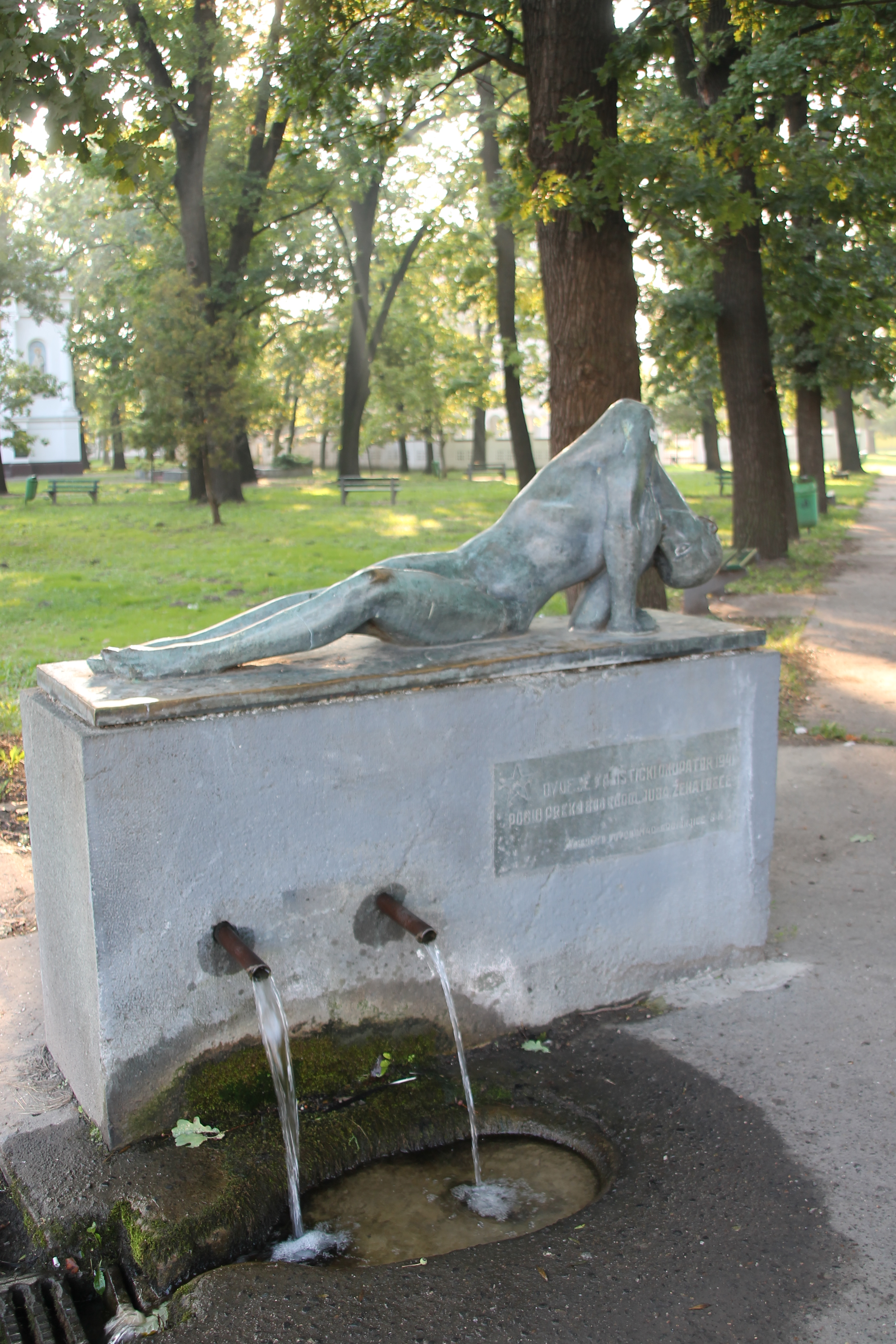
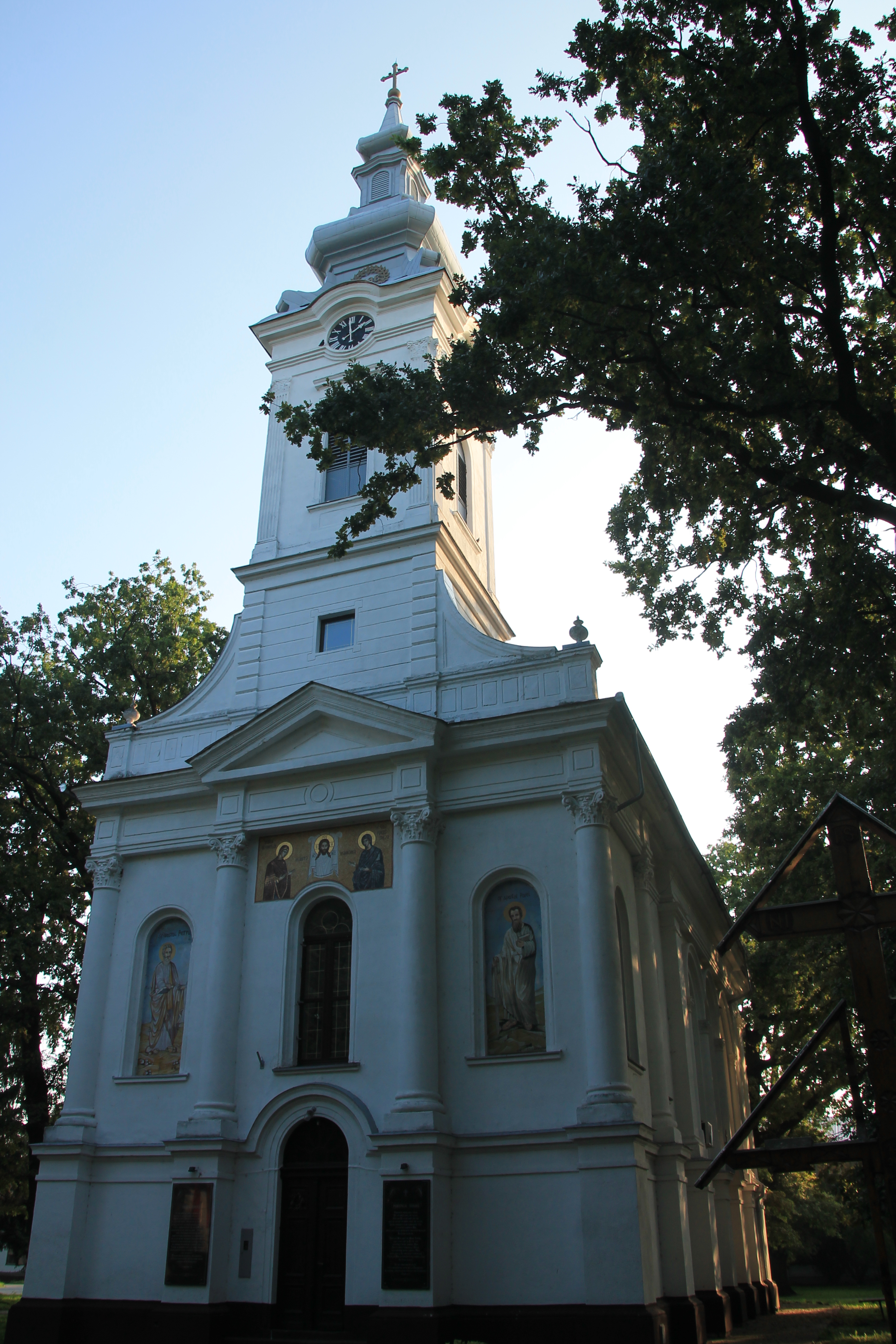
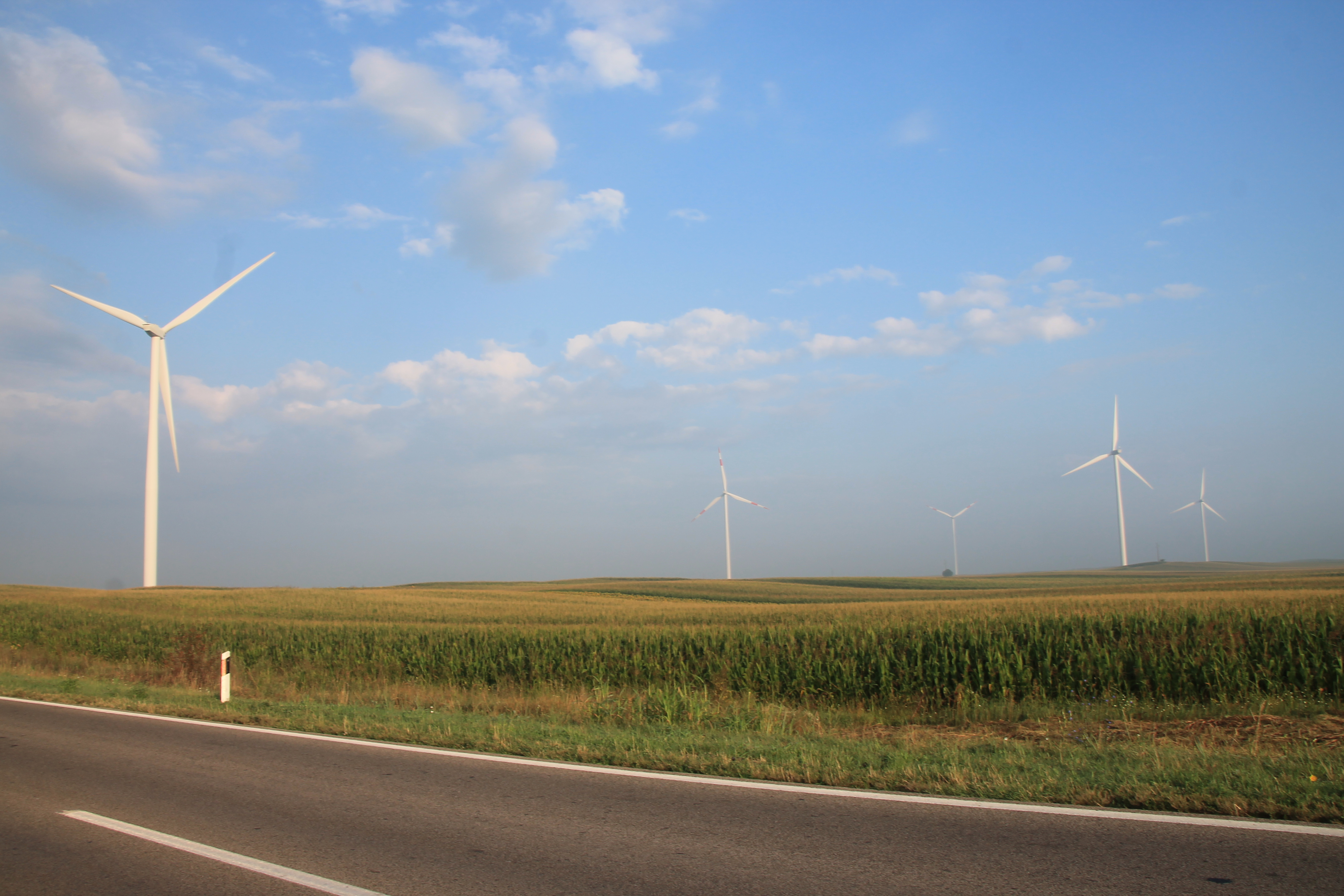
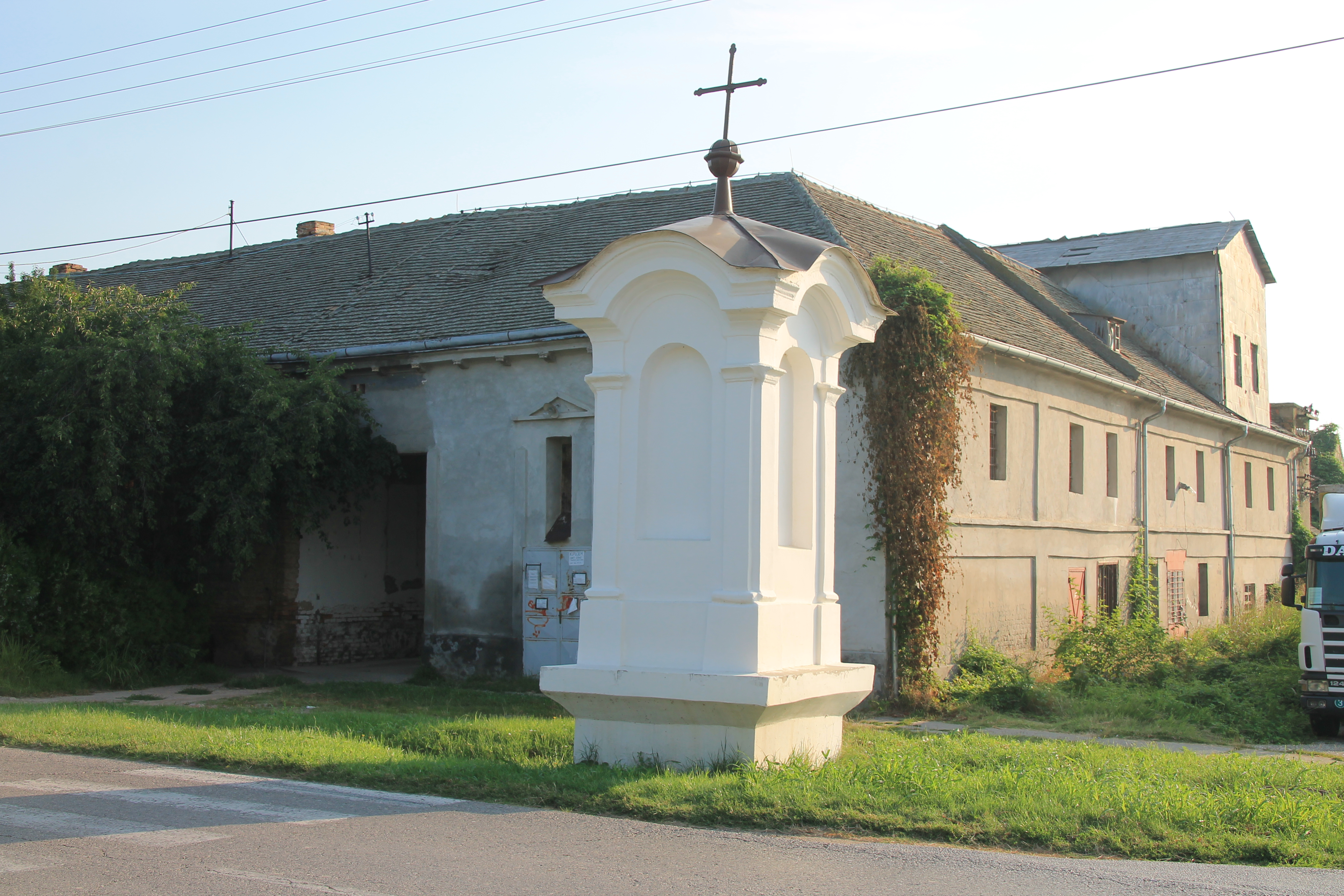
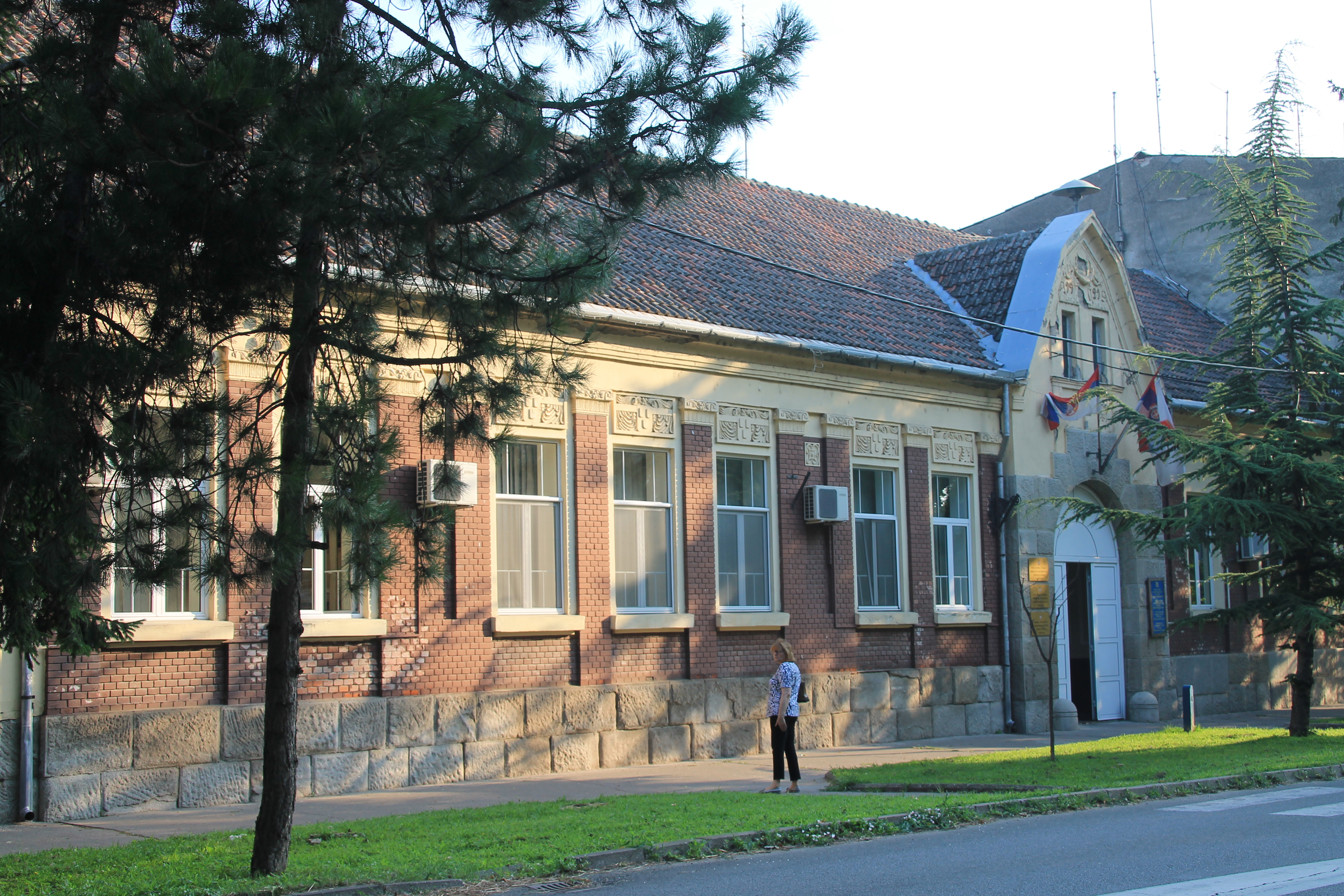
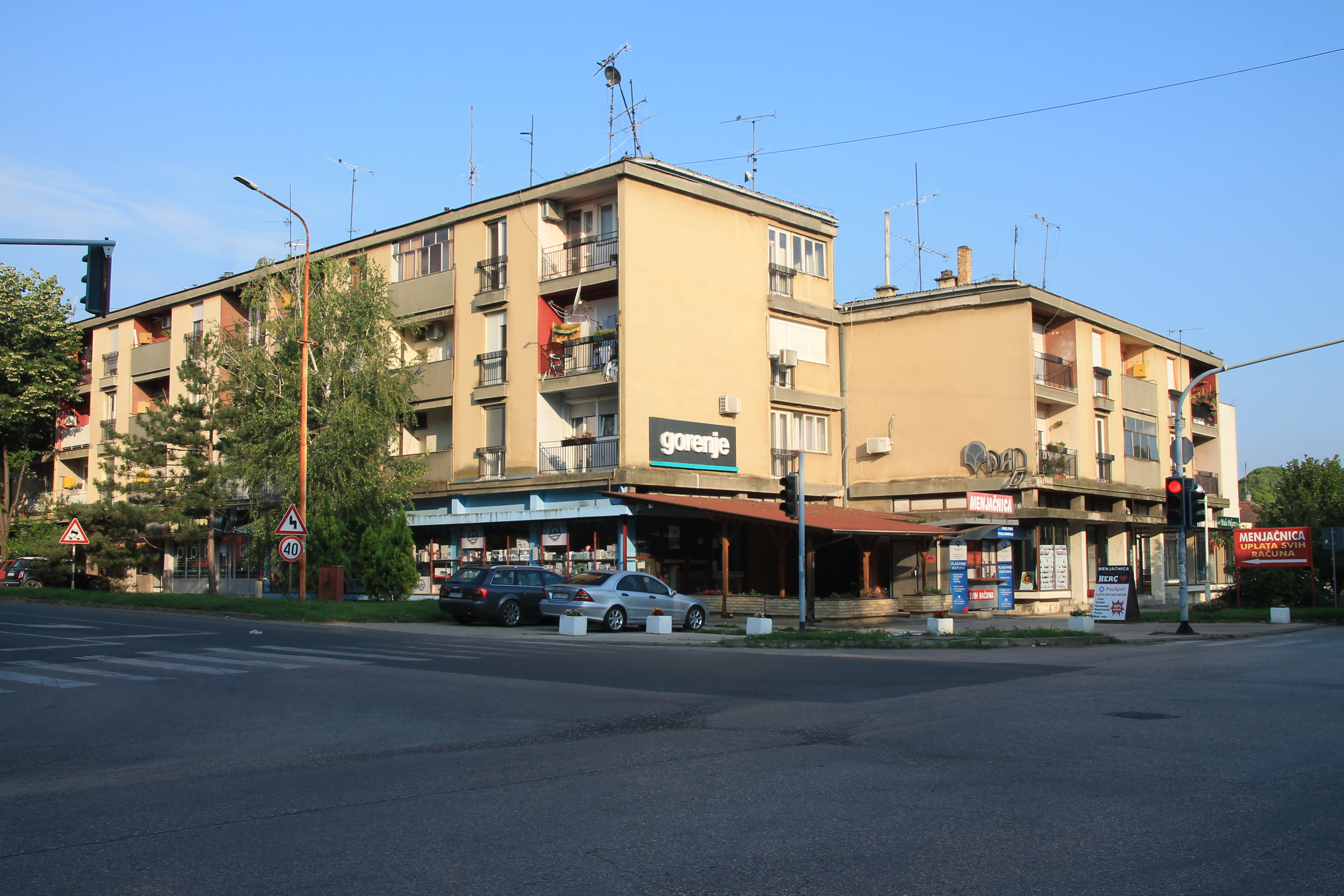
- Photos of Alibunar

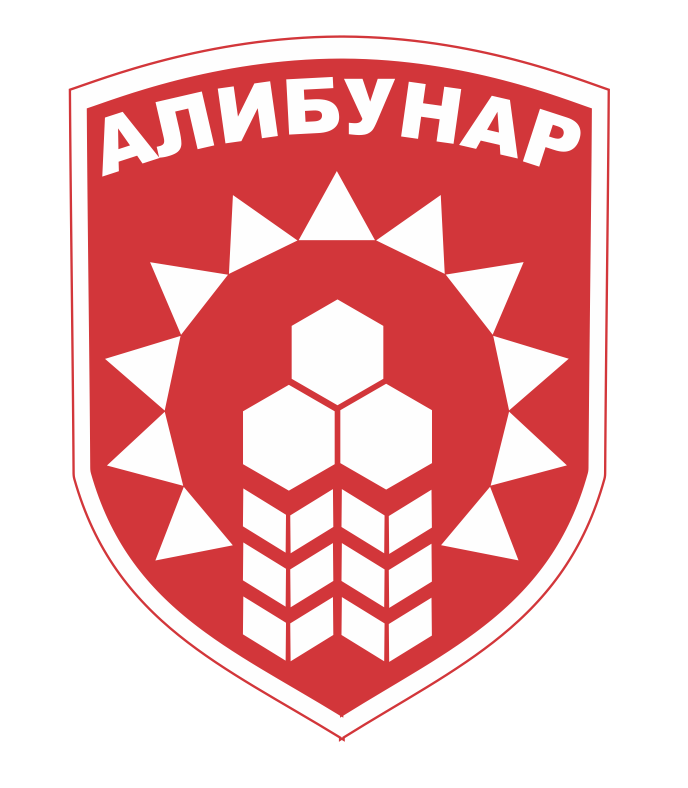
- Coat of arms

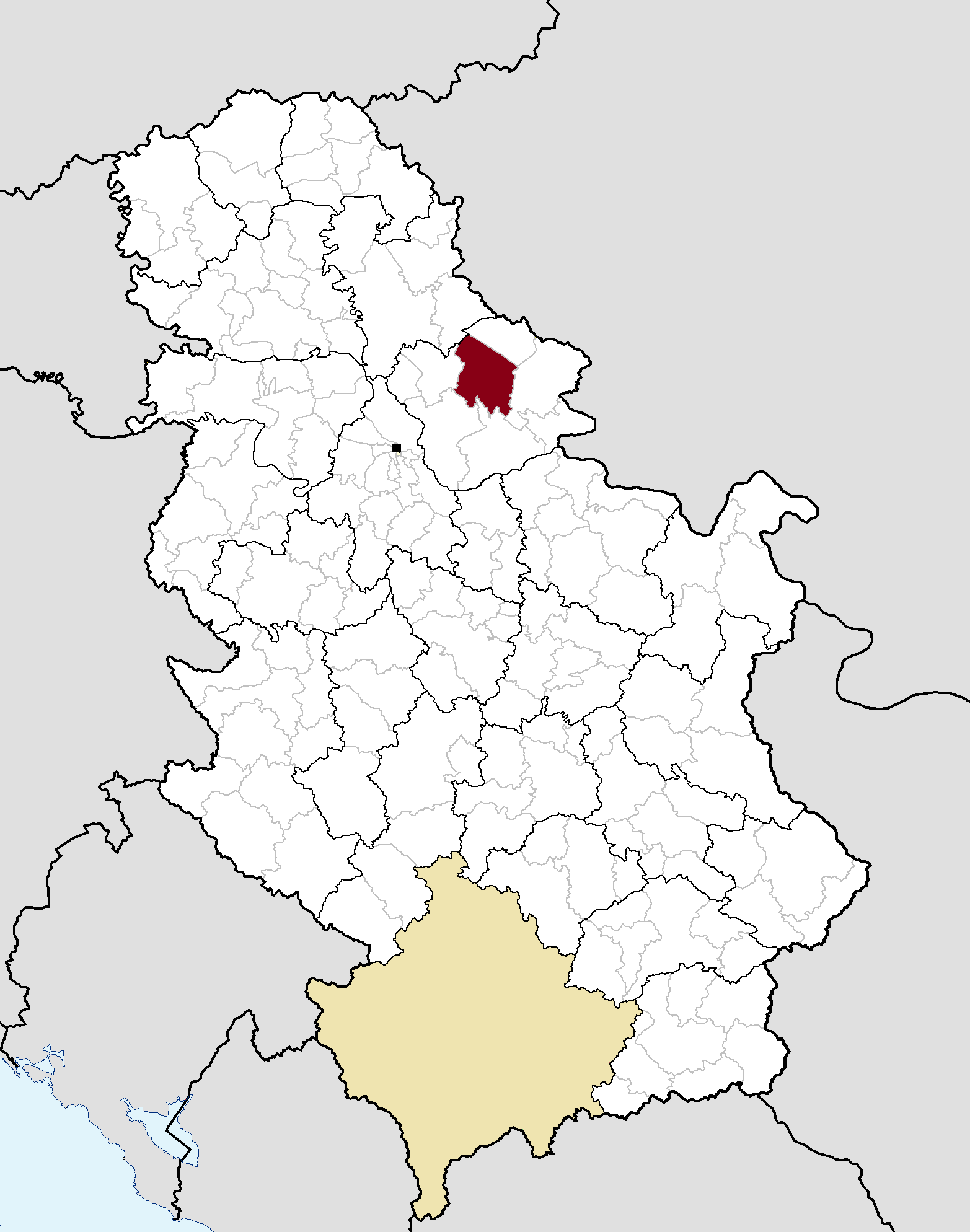
- Location of Alibunar within Serbia
- Coordinates: 45°4′50″N 20°57′56″E
- Country: Serbia
- Province: Vojvodina
- District: South Banat

Government
  - Mayor: Zorana Bratić
- Elevation: 71 m (233 ft)

Population (2022)
  - Alibunar: 2,694
  - Metro: 17,139
- Time zone: UTC+1 (CET)
  - Summer (DST): UTC+2 (CEST)
- Postal code: 26310
- Area code: +381(0)13
- Car plates: PA
- Official languages: Serbian together with Romanian and Slovak
- Website: www.alibunar.org.rs

Alibunar (Serbian Cyrillic: Алибунар; German: Alisbrunn; Romanian: Alibunar; Hungarian: Alibunár) is a town and municipality located in the South Banat District of the autonomous province of Vojvodina, Serbia. Alibunar town and Alibunar municipality have a population of 2,694 and 17,139 respectively (2022 census).

== Name ==
In Serbian, the town is known as Alibunar or Алибунар, in Romanian as Alibunar, in German as Alisbrunn, in Hungarian as Alibunár, and in Turkish as Alipınar (Ottoman Turkish: علی بوڭار).

The name of the town derived from the Serbian loanword from Turkish "bunar" ("well" in English) and Muslim/Turkish personal name "Ali". According to the local legend, Alibunar was named after Ali-paša (Ali-pasha), who had a cattle and a well at this place. Even today, there is a well in the town which is known as "Ali-pašin bunar" ("well of Ali-paša").

== Inhabited places ==
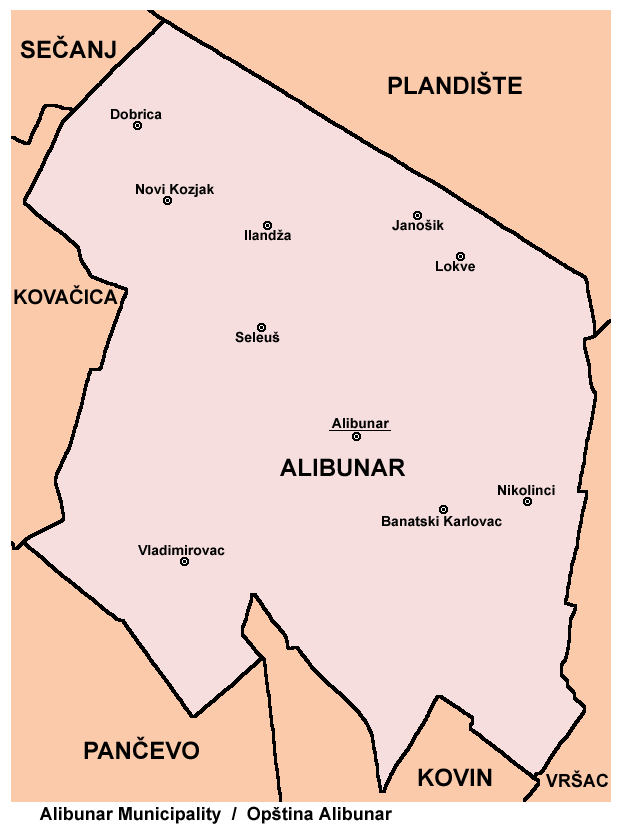
Map of Alibunar municipality

Alibunar municipality encompasses of town of Alibunar, town of Banatski Karlovac, and following villages:

- Dobrica
- Novi Kozjak
- Ilandža
- Seleuš (Romanian: Seleuș)
- Vladimirovac
- Janošik (Slovak: Janošík)
- Lokve (Romanian: Sânmihai) – official website
- Nikolinci (Romanian: Nicolinț)

== History ==
In this area, settlements existed in Neolithic, Bronze Age and Roman times. However, settlement appeared in historical sources in the 16th century. First recorded name of the settlement was Alijina Voda ("the water of Alija"), presumably named after its Muslim citizen Alija or Ali-paša, who had a house with stone well ("bunar" in Serbian) in the center of the settlement (hence the current name Alibunar or "the well of Ali"). After Ottomans were expelled from this region (in 1717), the settlement had 32 houses.

In 1764, settlement was included into Illyrian (Serbian) regiment of Banatian Military Frontier, but in the next year, it was transferred to German regiment of this frontier. Before the inclusion into military frontier, Alibunar had ethnic Serb population, but after it became part of the frontier, 130 mostly Romanian and some 20-30 German families settled in this place. Serbs remained to live in older part of the settlement, Germans settled in its central parts and Romanians in northern parts.

On May 17 and 18, 1768, Emperor Joseph II came to Alibrunn during his tour of the Banat from Timișoara. He spent the night here and the next day, after visiting the Alibrunn Marshes, continued his journey to Tomasovác (Tamáslaka). The Serbian Orthodox church in the settlement was built in 1796.

== Demographics ==
Historical population
| Year | Pop. | ±% p.a. |
|---|---|---|
| 1948 | 32,552 | — |
| 1953 | 31,770 | −0.49% |
| 1961 | 32,932 | +0.45% |
| 1971 | 31,833 | −0.34% |
| 1981 | 29,383 | −0.80% |
| 1991 | 26,535 | −1.01% |
| 2002 | 22,954 | −1.31% |
| 2011 | 20,151 | −1.44% |
| 2022 | 17,139 | −1.46% |

According to the 2011 census, the total population of the municipality of Alibunar was 20,151 inhabitants.

=== Ethnic groups ===
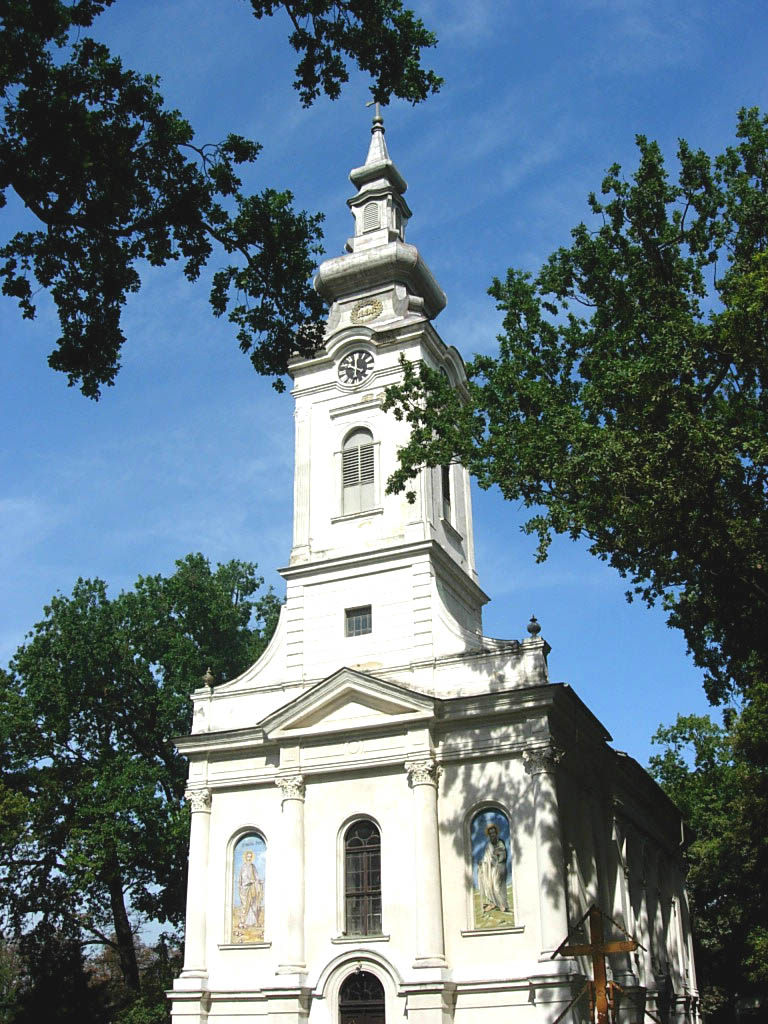
The Romanian Orthodox church

Municipality

The population of the Alibunar municipality:

- Serbs = 13,680 (59.59%)
- Romanians = 6,076 (26.47%)
- Slovaks = 1,195 (5.2%)
- Romani = 657 (2.86%)
- Hungarians = 309 (1.34%)

Settlements with a Serb ethnic majority are: Alibunar, Banatski Karlovac, Vladimirovac, Dobrica, Ilandža, and Novi Kozjak. The settlement with a Slovak ethnic majority is Janošik. The settlements with Romanian ethnic majority are: Lokve and Nikolinci. The ethnically mixed settlement with a relative Romanian majority is Seleuš.

The municipality of Alibunar contains the biggest ethnic Romanian community in Vojvodina.

Town

The population of the Alibunar town:

- Serbs = 2,052 (59.81%)
- Romanians = 960 (27.98%)
- Romani = 87 (2.54%)
- Hungarians = 61 (1.78%)
- Slovaks = 46 (1.34%)
- Macedonians = 43 (1.25%)
- Yugoslavs = 42 (1.22%)

== Notable citizens ==
- Slobodan Bitević (*1988)

== See also ==
- List of places in Serbia
- List of cities, towns and villages in Vojvodina
