= List of places named after Josip Broz Tito =

During Josip Broz Tito's presidency and in the years following his death in 1980, several places in the Socialist Federal Republic of Yugoslavia and across the world were named or renamed in honor of him as part of his cult of personality. Since the breakup of Yugoslavia, several towns and squares in the former nation have reverted their names. Numerous streets were also named after Tito, both in former Yugoslavia as well as elsewhere as an honour to a foreign dignitary.

== Cities formerly named after Tito ==
A total of eight towns and cities were named after Tito. Right after World War II, four municipalities whose role in the partisan resistance movement was perceived as significant gained the adjective "Tito's" (locally Titov/Titova/Titovo), while the capital of the smallest federal republic of Montenegro was renamed Titograd (Tito-city). After Tito's death in 1980, four more cities were added, for a total of one in each of the Yugoslav six federal republics and two autonomous provinces. These were as follows:

=== Montenegro ===
- Titograd, July 13, 1946 – April 2, 1992 – Podgorica

=== Bosnia and Herzegovina ===
- Titov Drvar, 1981–1991 – Drvar, Canton 10, Federation of Bosnia and Herzegovina

=== Croatia ===
- Titova Korenica, December 5, 1945 – February 7, 1997 – Korenica

=== Serbia ===
- Titovo Užice, 1946–1992 – Užice
- Titov Vrbas, 1983–1992 – Vrbas, Vojvodina
- Titova Mitrovica, 1981–1992 – Kosovska Mitrovica

=== Slovenia ===
- Titovo Velenje, October 10, 1981 – July 17, 1990 – Velenje

=== North Macedonia ===
- Titov Veles, 1946–1996 – Veles

With the dissolution of Yugoslavia, each city was renamed.

== Streets and squares ==
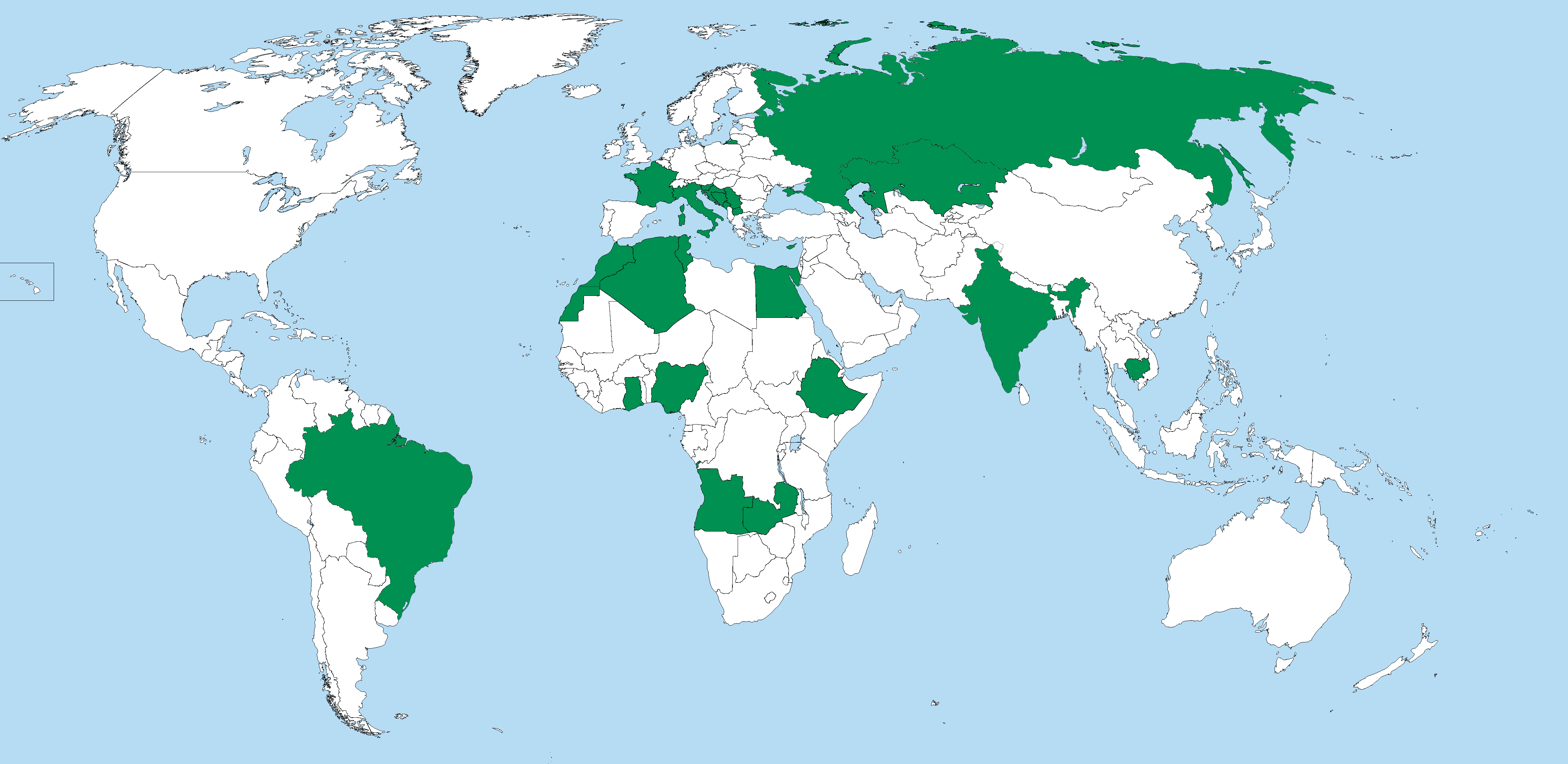
Countries in the world with streets named for Marshal Tito

Many towns in the countries of former Yugoslavia and in other countries have streets and squares named after him.

=== Slovenia ===
- Ilirska Bistrica: Trg Maršala Tita (main square)
- Jesenice: Cesta Maršala Tita
- Koper: Titov trg (main square)
- Logatec: Titova ulica
- Ljubljana: Titova cesta (renamed to Slovenska cesta (Slovenian Avenue) in 1991); Titova cesta, a section of Štajerska cesta named after Tito in 2009. After Tito street decision in Slovenia renamed to Štajerska cesta.
- Maribor: Titova cesta (main street), Titov most (Tito's Bridge)
- Postojna: Titov trg (main square), Titova cesta
- Radeče: Titova ulica
- Radenci: Titova cesta
- Senovo: Titova cesta
- Slovenska Bistrica: Titova cesta
- Tolmin: Trg Maršala Tita (main square)
- Velenje: Titov trg (main square with highest Tito's statue in the world)

In 2011, 2 years after a street in Ljubljana was named after Tito, the Constitutional Court of Slovenia ruled that naming of a new street after Josip Broz Tito was unconstitutional. The court unanimously ruled that Tito symbolizes severe human rights violations, and that naming the street after him glorifies totalitarian regime and violates human dignity. In 2020, the Constitutional Court of Slovenia allowed a referendum against the renaming of Tito's street in Radenci. In contrast to the decision about the street in Ljubljana, the street in Radenci had been named after Tito more than 40 years ago; the court rejected the mayor's claim that a referendum to keep the name would violate the constitution.

=== Croatia ===
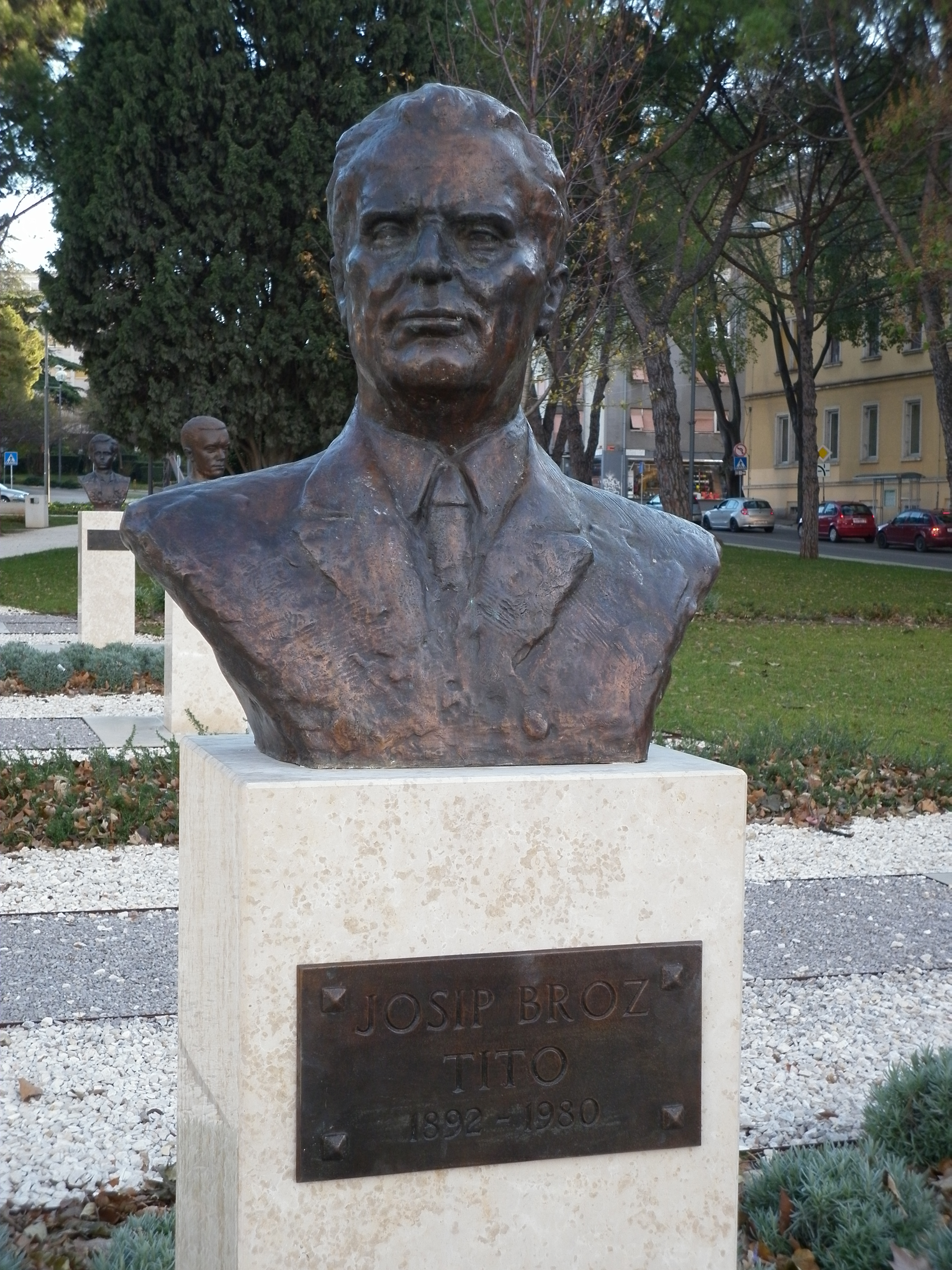
Bust of Josip Broz Tito at Tito's Park (Titov park) in Pula, Croatia

- Banovci: Ulica maršala Tita
- Buje: Trg J.B. Tita
- Buzet: Titov trg
- Celine Goričke (Marija Gorica): Ulica maršala Tita
- Fažana: Titova riva
- Kumrovec: Ulica Josipa Broza
- Labin: Titov trg (main square)
- Lovran: Šetalište maršala Tita
- Matulji: Trg maršala Tita
- Nedelišće: Ulica Maršala Tita
- Novigrad: Ulica Josipa Broza Tita
- Novo Selo Rok (Čakovec): Ulica Maršala Tita
- Opatija: Ulica Maršala Tita
- Poreč: Obala maršala Tita
- Pula: Titov park
- Rabac: Obala maršala Tita
- Rijeka: Titov trg
- Rovinj: Trg maršala Tita
- Selce: Ulica maršala Tita
- Šenkovec: Ulica maršala Tita
- Starogradacki Marof (Stari Gradac): Maršala Tita
- Turopolje: Ulica maršala Tita
- Umag: Obala maršala Tita
- Veli Lošinj: Obala maršala Tita
- Vinkovački Banovci: Ulica maršala Tita
- Vrsar: Obala maršala Tita
- Zabok: Ulica Josipa Broza Tita
- Zmajevac, Suza : Ulica maršala Tita

Former

- Dubrovnik: Ulica maršala Tita (now Ulica dr. Ante Starčevića)
- Vukovar: Ulica maršala Tita (now Ulica dr. Franje Tuđmana)
- Cerna: Ulica maršala Tita (now Velika Cerna)
- Karlovac: Trg Josipa Broza Tita (now Trg hrvatskih branitelja)
- Šibenik: Poljana maršala Tita (now Poljana)
- Mursko Središće: Ulica Josipa Broza Tita (now Ulica Republike Hrvatske)
- Zadar: Obala Maršala Tita (now Obala kralja Petra Krešimira IV)
- Zagreb: Trg maršala Tita (now Republic of Croatia Square since 2017).
- Zaprešić: Ulica maršala Tita (now Cardinal Aloysius Stepinac Street)
- Varaždinske Toplice: Ulica Maršala Tita (now dr. Franjo Tuđman Street)
- Velika Gorica: Trg maršala Tita (now Trg grada Vukovara)

=== Bosnia and Herzegovina ===
The only towns in Republika Srpska that names a street after Tito are Kozarac and Srebrenica; all other towns are in the Federation of Bosnia and Herzegovina

- Bihać: Trg maršala Tita
- Bosanska Krupa: Ulica maršala Tita
- Bratunac: Ulica maršala Tita
- Breza: Titova ulica
- Drvar: Titova ili Put Oficirske Škole
- Foča: Titov Most
- Goražde: Ulica maršala Tita
- Gradačac: Titova ulica
- Jajce: Ulica maršala Tita
- Jelah: Titova ulica
- Konjic: Ulica maršala Tita
- Kozarac:Ulica maršala Tita
- Lukavac: Titova ulica
- Mostar: Ulica maršala Tita
- Novi Travnik: Ulica maršala Tita (former?)

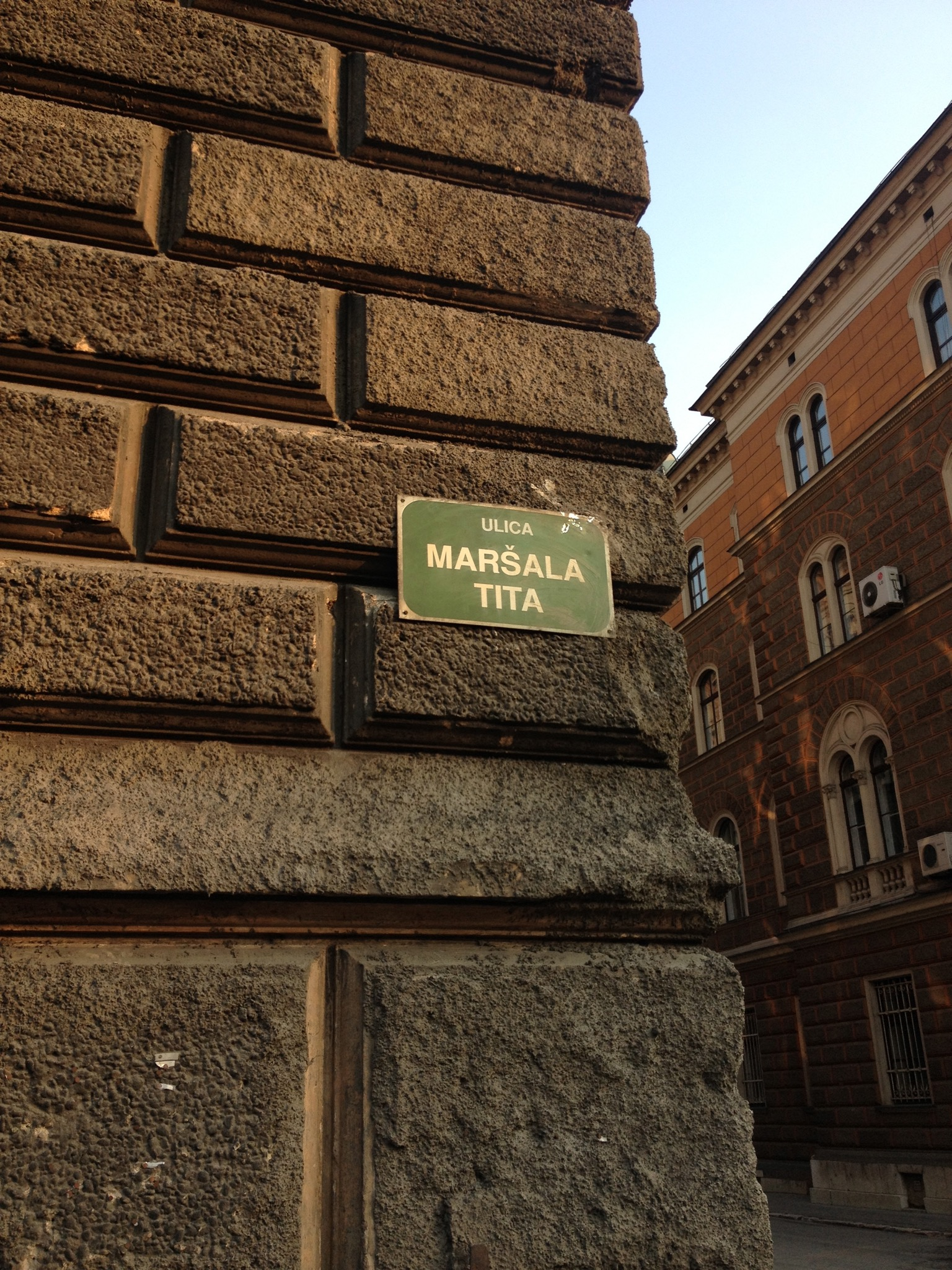
Ulica Maršala Tita in Sarajevo

- Sarajevo: Ulica Maršala Tita (main street)
- Srebrenica: Ulica Maršala Tita
- Tešanj: Ulica maršala Tita
- Tuzla: Titova ulica
- Zavidovići: Ulica Maršala Tita
- Zenica: Titova ulica
- Živinice: Titova ulica

Former

- Bugojno: Ulica maršala Tita (now Sultan Ahmedova)
- Odžak: Titova ulica (now Ulica 102. odžačke brigade HVO and Aleja mira)

=== Serbia ===
- Banja Koviljača: Maršala Tita
- Boleč: Maršala Tita
- Čokot: Maršala Tita
- Dobanovci: Maršala Tita
- Jakovo, Beograd: Maršala Tita
- Krepoljin: Maršala Tita
- Kraljevo: Titogradska
- Krupanj: Maršala Tita
- Kumane: Maršala Tita
- Lešnica: Maršala Tita
- Leštane: Maršala Tita
- Medoševac: Maršala Tita
- Meljak: Maršala Tita
- Mezgraja: Maršala Tita
- Niš: Naselje Marsala Tita (Durlan)
- Pajkovac: Maršala Tita
- Palilula, Belgrade: Maršala Tita
- Petrovac na Mlavi: Titov gaj
- Požarevac: Titogradska
- Požeženo: Maršala Tita
- Preševo: Maršala Tita
- Slanci: Maršala Tita
- Tabanović: Maršala Tita
- Umčari: Maršala Tita
- Vranje: Titogradska
- Žagubica: Maršala Tita
- Zaklopača: Maršala Tita
- Železnik, Beograd: Titova
- Zvezdara, Beograd: Titov gaj

Vojvodina

- Ada: Maršala Tita
- Adorjan: Maršala Tita
- Aradac: Maršala Tita
- Bač: Maršala Tita
- Bačka Topola: Maršala Tita;
  - Pobeda: Maršala Tita
- Bački Brestovac:Maršala Tita
- Bački Gračac: Maršala Tita
- Bački Petrovac: Ulica maršala Tita
- Banatska Dubica: Maršala Tita
- Banatski Dvor: Maršala Tita
- Bajša: Maršala Tita
- Banatsko Novo Selo: Maršala Tita
- Belo Blato: Maršala Tita
- Bočar: Maršala Tita
- Boka: Maršala Tita
- Čantavir: Maršala Tita
- Čestereg: Maršala Tita
- Čoka: Maršala Tita
- Čortanovci: Maršala Tita
- Crepaja: Maršala Tita
- Crna Bara: Maršala Tita
- Crvenka: ulica Maršala Tita
- Deliblato: Maršala Tita
- Elemir: Maršala Tita
- Ečka: Maršala Tita
- Erdevik: Maršala Tita
- Farkaždin: Maršala Tita
- Feketić: Maršala Tita
- Gložan: Maršala Tita
- Jaša Tomić: Maršala Tita
- Kačarevo: Maršala Tita
- Klenak: Maršala Tita
- Konak: Maršala Tita
- Kovačica: Maršala Tita
  - Padina: Elementary school Maršala Tita, Ulica maršala Tita
- Kruščić: Maršala Tita
- Kula: ulica Maršala Tita
- Kulpin: Ulica maršala Tita
- Kumane: Maršala Tita
- Kucura: Maršala Tita
- Kupinovo: Maršala Tita
- Lovćenac: Maršala Tita
- Lukino Selo: Maršala Tita
- Maglić: Maršala Tita
- Majdan: Tito Marsal
- Mošorin: Maršala Tita
- Nova Crnja: Maršala Tita
- Nova Gajdobra: Maršala Tita
- Novi Bečej: Maršala Tita
- Novi Itebej: Maršala Tita
- Novi Žednik: Titogradska
- Novo Miloševo: Maršala Tita (main street)
- Obrež: Maršala Tita
- Padej: Maršala Tita
- Panonija: trg Maršala Tita
- Ratkovo: Maršala Tita
- Ravno Selo: Maršala Tita
- Ruski Krstur: Maršala Tita
- Samoš: Maršala Tita
- Sanad: Maršala Tita
- Selenča: Maršala Tita
- Seleuš: Maršala Tita
- Sivac: ulica Maršala Tita
- Skorenovac: Maršala Tita
- Stari Banovci: Titov Park Kosarkasko Igraliste
- Subotica: Aleja Maršala Tita (one of the main streets)
- Sutjeska: Maršala Tita
- Taraš: Maršala Tita
- Tomaševac: Maršala Tita
- Torak: Maršala Tita
- Trešnjevac: Maršala Tita
- Uzdin: Maršala Tita
- Vajska: Maršala Tita
- Veliki Radinci: Maršala Tita
- Vrbas: Ulica maršala Tita, Titova Vila
- Vrbica: Maršala Tita

Former

- Beograd: Maršala Tita (the main street, renamed back to Srpskih Vladara in 1992, now Kralja Milana)
- Zemun: Ulica maršala Tita (the main street, renamed back to Glavna ulica, meaning "main street")
- Šabac: Maršala Tita (the main street, renamed to Gospodar Jevremova in 2005.)
- Ruma: Maršala Tita (the main street, renamed back to Glavna ulica, meaning "main street")
- Užice: Maršala Tita (the main street, renamed to Dimitrija Tucovića street)
- Jagodina (Svetozarevo 1946–1992): Maršala Tita (the main street, renamed to Kneginje Milice in 1992)
- Kikinda: Maršala Tita (the main street, renamed to Kralja Petra I in 1993) and Titov trg (main square, renamed Trg srpskih dobrovoljaca in 1993)
- Zrenjanin: Maršala Tita (the main street, renamed back to Kralja Aleksandra in 1992)
- Novi Sad: Bulevar maršala Tita (renamed to Bulevar Mihajla Pupina in 1992)
- Batajnica: Josipa Broza-Tita (the main street, renamed to Majora Zorana Radosavljevica in 2004)
- Temerin: Maršala Tita (the main street, renamed to Novosadska during 1990s)

=== Montenegro ===
- Herceg Novi: Trg maršala Tita
- Bar: Ulica maršala Tita
- Podgorica: Josipa Broza Tita; Titove Korenice
- Rožaje: Maršala Tita
- Tivat: Obala maršala Tita

Former

- Cetinje: Titov trg (now Dvorski trg)
- Ulcinj: Bulevard maršala Tita (now Bulevard Gjergj Kastrioti - Skënderbeu)

=== North Macedonia ===
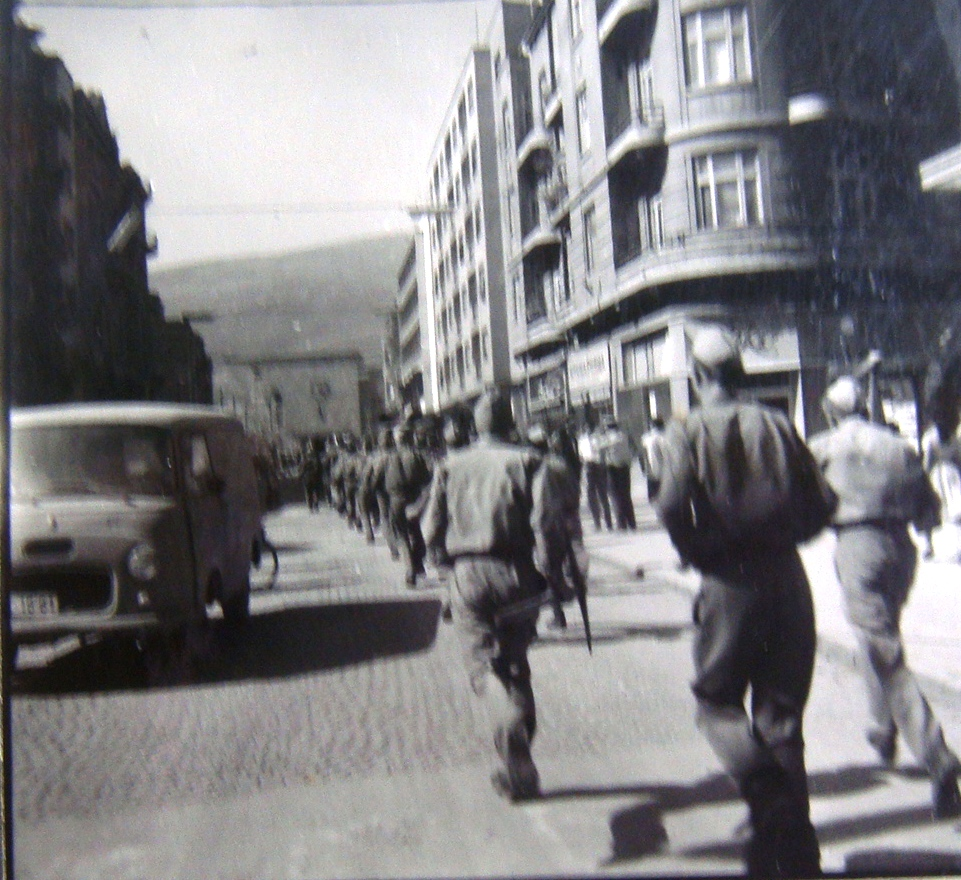
Marshal Tito Street at Skopje. (26 July 1963, the Yugoslav People's Army support stuff for earthquake)

- Valandovo: Maršal Tito
- Berovo: Maršal Tito
- Bitola: Титово Ужице
- Delčevo: Maršal Tito
- Demir Hisar: Maršal Tito
- Demir Kapija: Maršal Tito
- Negotino: Maršal Tito
- Gevgelija: Maršal Tito
- Josifovo: Maršal Tito
- Kičevo: Maršal Tito
- Kočani: Maršal Tito
- Kriva Palanka: Maršal Tito
- Kumanovo: Титова Митровачка
- Makedonska Kamenica: Maršal Tito
- Makedonski Brod, Marsal Tito
- Radovis: Maršal Tito
- Skopje: Maršal Tito, Титовелешка
- Star Dojran: Maršal Tito
- Stip: Kej Maršal Tito
- Struga: Maršal Tito
- Strumica: ulica Maršal Tito
- Sveti Nikole: Marsal Tito
- Veles: Maršal Tito
- Vinica: bul. Tito

Former

- Bitola: Maršal Tito (now Širok Sokak)
- Ohrid: Kej Maršal Tito (now Kej Makedonija)
- Tetovo: Square Maršal Tito (former name)

=== Algeria ===
- Parc Tito in Bab Ezzouar

=== Angola ===
- Luanda: Rua Marechal Tito Presidente

=== Brazil ===
- São Paulo: Avenida Marechal Tito

=== Cambodia ===
- Phnom Penh: Josep Broz Tito Street

=== Cyprus ===
- Limassol: Οδός Ιωσήφ Μπροζ Τίτο
- Dali: Οδός Στρατάρχη Τίτο

=== Egypt ===
- Cairo: Josip Broz Tito Street, Huckstep, Qism El-Nozha (by the Cairo International Airport)

=== Ethiopia ===
- Addis Ababa: Josif (Broz) Tito's street

=== France ===
- Châlons-en-Champagne: Rue du Maréchal Tito

=== Ghana ===
- Accra: Josif Broz Tito Avenue

=== India ===
- New Delhi: J B Tito Marg
- Jodhpur: Shri Tito Chauraha

=== Italy ===
- Nuoro: via Tito
- Palma di Montechiaro: via Tito
- Parma: via Josip Broz Tito
- Quattro Castella: via Maresciallo Tito
- Reggio Emilia: via Josip Broz Tito

=== Kazakhstan ===
- Titova, oblast Qostanaj 110000, near Arkalyk

=== Morocco ===
- Agadir: Tito Street

=== Nigeria ===
- Abuja: Tito Broz street

=== Russia ===
- Moscow: Ploshchad Iosipa Broz Tito (Josip Broz Tito Square) above the Profsoyuznaya metro station.
- Titov, near Litvinovka, oblast Rostov

=== Slovakia ===
- Košice: Titogradská ulica

=== Tunisia ===
- Sousse: Marshal Tito Avenue

=== Ukraine ===
- Bakhmut: Tito Street

=== Zambia ===
- Lusaka: Tito Road

== Mountain peaks ==
=== North Macedonia ===
- Titov Vrv (meaning Tito's peak), Šar Mountains

== Asteroid ==
- 1550 Tito (discovered by Milorad B. Protić)

== Gallery ==
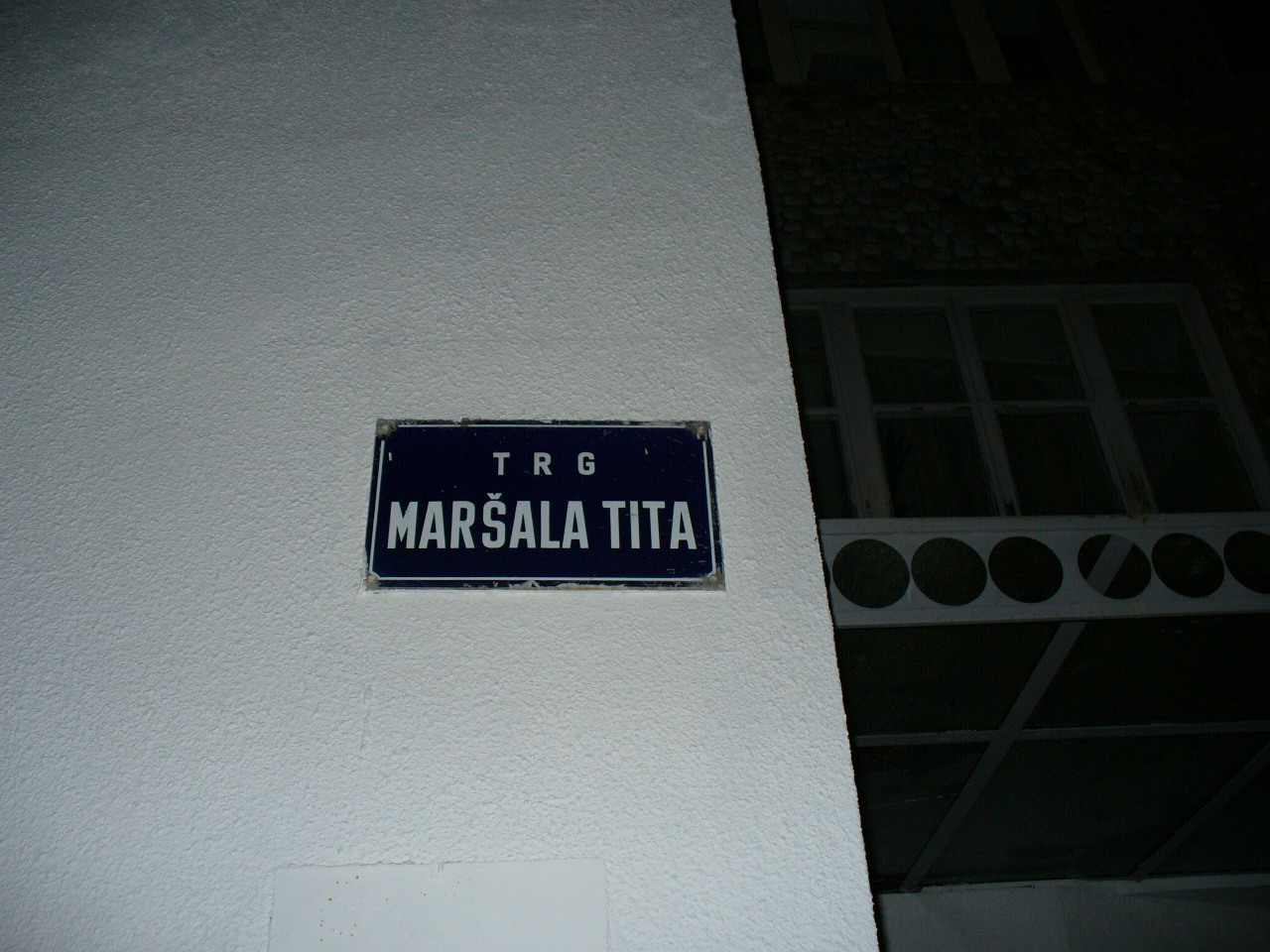
Trg Maršala Tita (Marshal Tito Square) in Herceg Novi, Montenegro

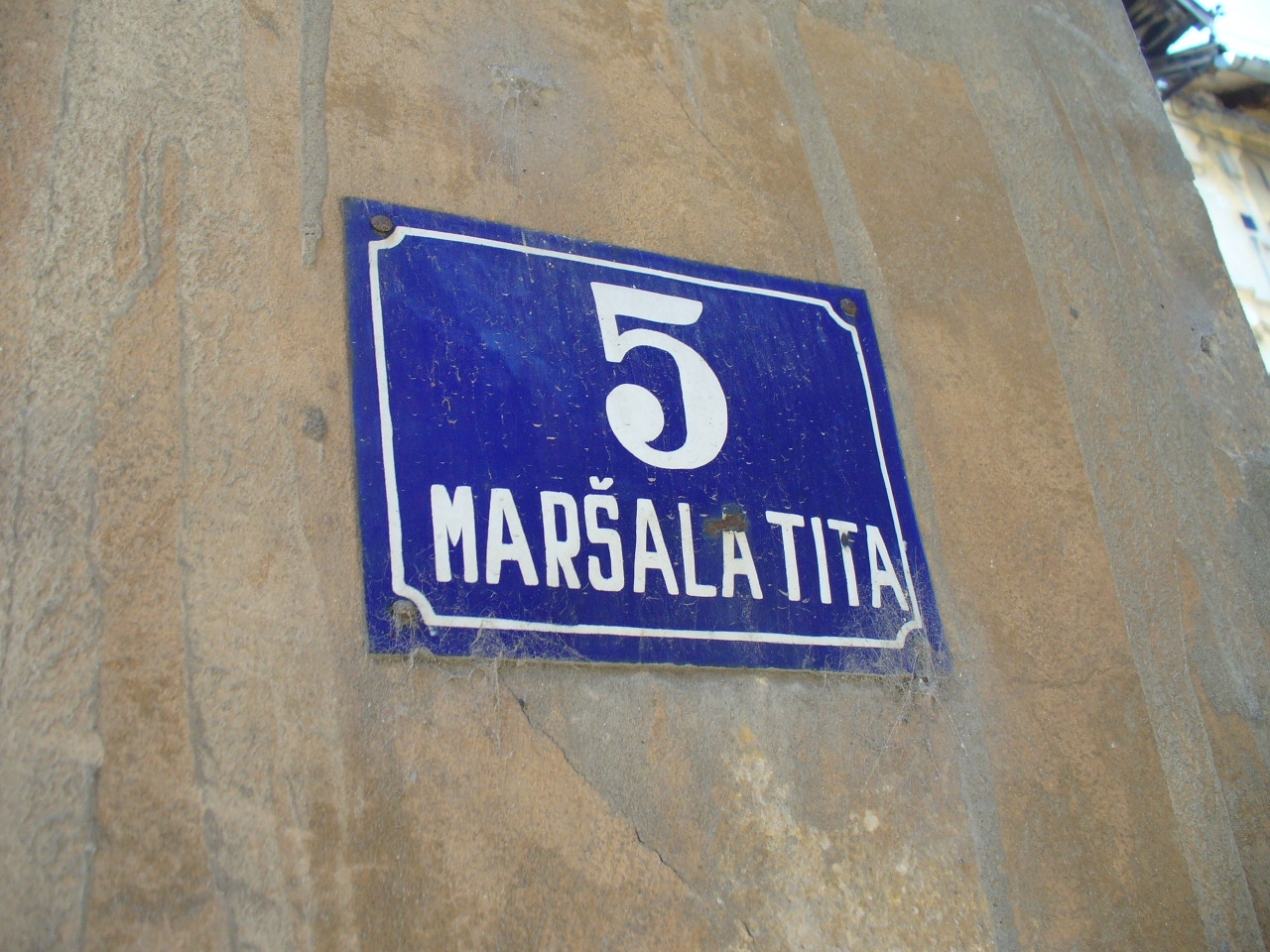
Ulica Maršala Tita (Marshal Tito Street) in Srbobran, Serbia

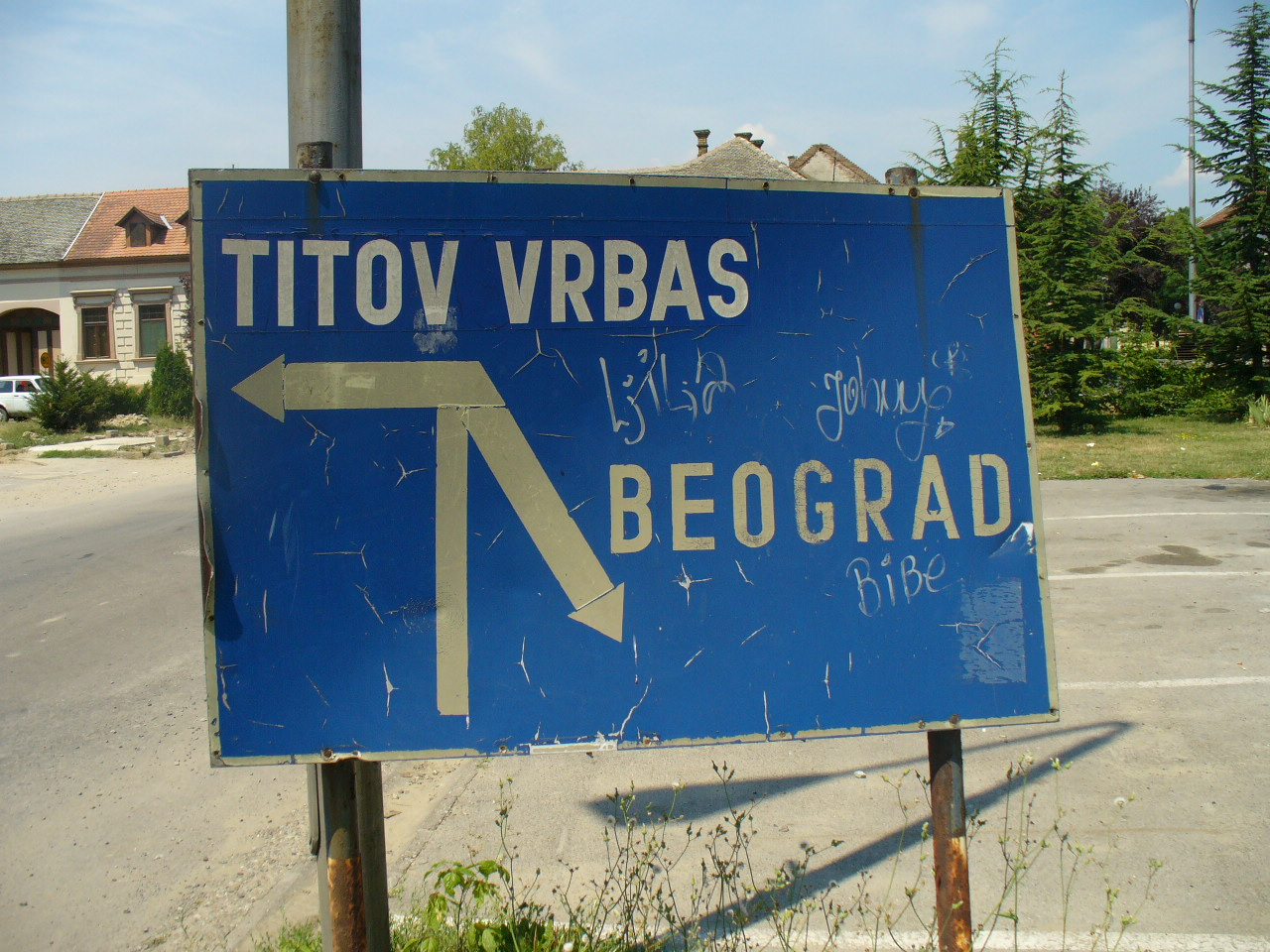
Old road sign in Srbobran, Serbia, pointing to Titov Vrbas

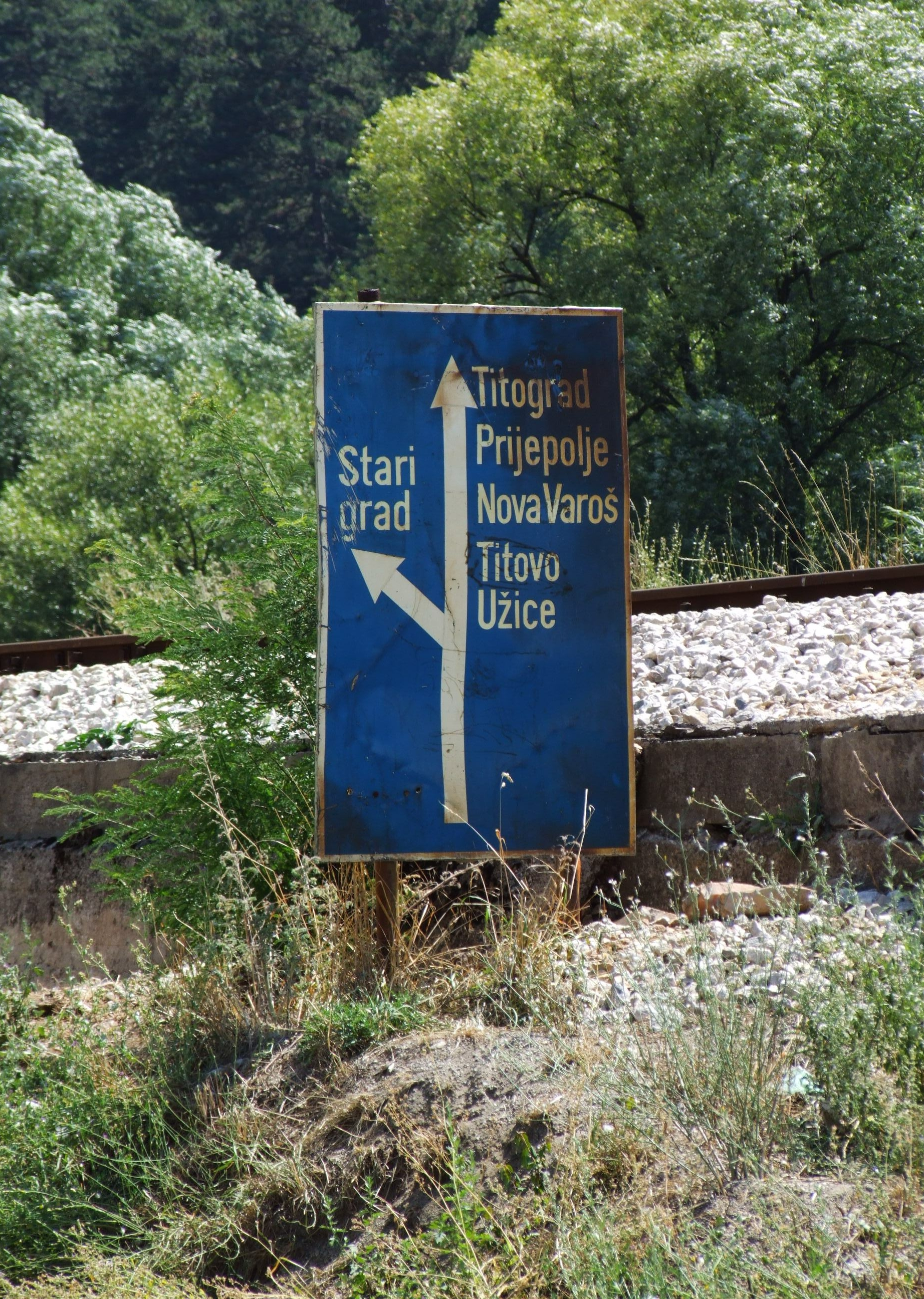
Old road sign in Serbia, pointing to Titograd and Titovo Užice
