= Slovaks in Serbia =

Словаци у Србији Slováci v Srbsku
- Ethnic flag of Slovaks in Serbia

Total population
- 41,730 (2022)

Regions with significant populations
- Vojvodina: 39,807

Languages
- Slovak and Serbian

Religion
- Protestantism (Lutheranism)

Slovaks are a recognized ethnic minority in Serbia. According to data from the 2022 census, the population of ethnic Slovaks in Serbia is 41,730, constituting 0.6% of the total population.

They mainly live in Vojvodina, where they number 39,807, being the third largest ethnic group (after Serbs and Hungarians) and make up 2.3% of the province's population. Unlike most other ethnic Slovaks, both in Slovakia and in the diaspora, Slovaks in Serbia are predominantly Protestant (Lutheran) belonging to the Slovak Evangelical Church of the Augsburg Confession in Serbia.

== History ==
The modern Slovaks in Vojvodina are descendants of 18th- and 19th-century settlers, who migrated from the territory of present-day Slovakia. First Slovak settlers from area around Tatra migrated to Bačka during the rule of Karlo I; in 1720 Slovaks settled in Bajša, in 1740 in Petrovac and Futog, and in 1742 (during the rule of Maria Theresa) in Bezdan. Some of them also later moved to Syrmia. In 1760, 120 Slovak families were settled in Selenča, but they later moved to Stara Pazova in Syrmia.

In 1783, Slovaks settled in Kisač, Kruščić, Gložan, and Bačka Topola. Part of them also settled in Bajša. In 1790–1791, Slovaks settled in Pivnice, in 1792 in Banatska Palanka, and in 1793 in Novi Slankamen. In 1784–1787, Slovaks settled in Međa. In 1792 Slovaks settled in Bačka Palanka. Some of them moved in 1788 to Aradac and Ečka, and some of them later also moved to Lalić.

In 1800, Slovaks settled in Kovačica, and in 1806 and 1809 in Padina. In 1806, one group of Slovaks settled in Čoka, and in 1809 in Krajišnik. In 1825, Slovaks settled in Banatski Dvor, and in 1830 in Stari Lec. In 1850, 20 Slovak families were settled in Grk. In 1868, Slovaks settled in Vojlovica. At the same time, some Slovaks also settled in Ivanovo. In 1887, Slovaks were settled in Belo Blato, and in 1899 in Silađi colony near Apatin.

According to data from the 1880 census, Slovaks were the sixth largest ethnic group within present-day Vojvodina and they numbered 43,318. By the end of the World War I, many of the Slovaks were hungarized.

== Demographics ==
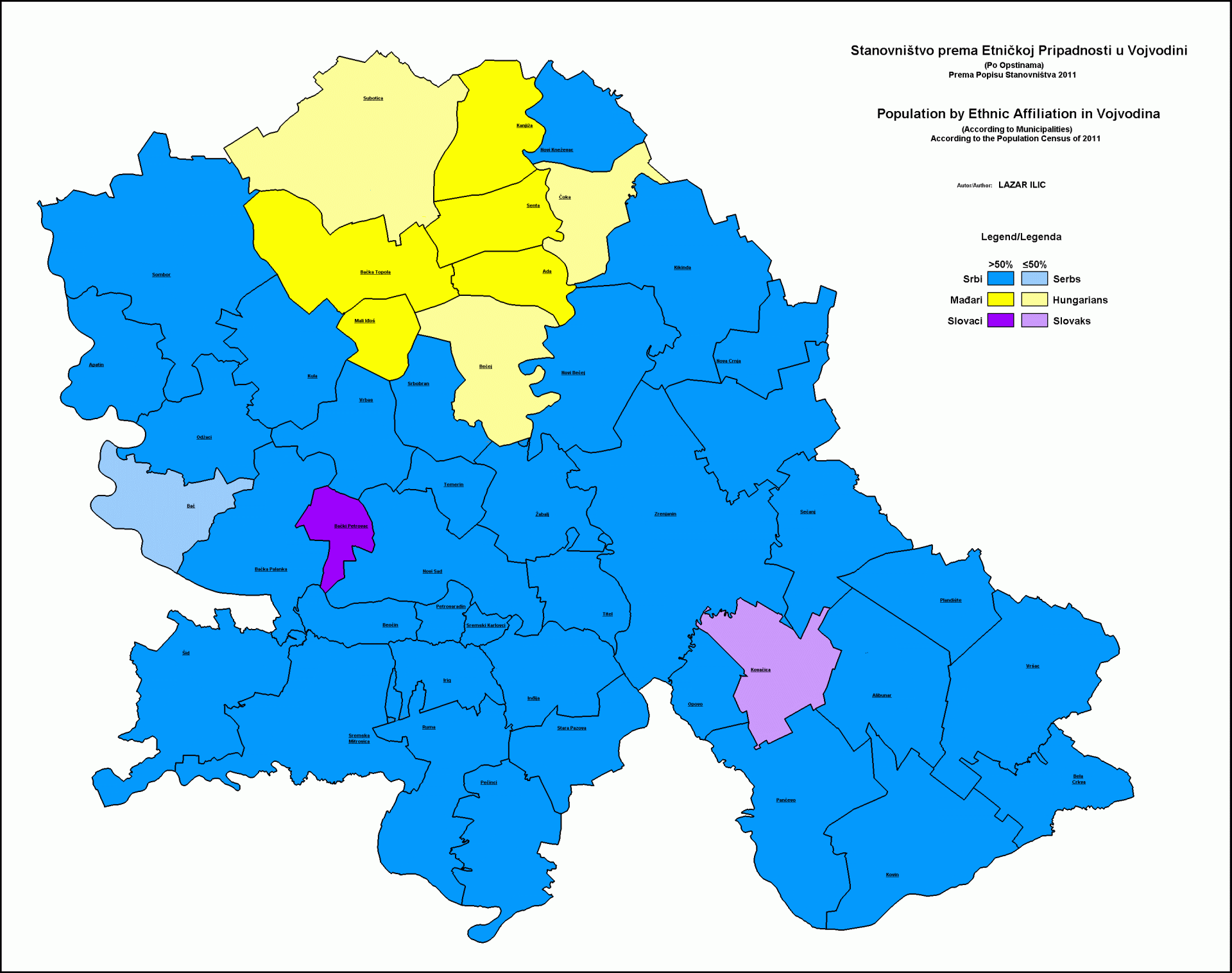
Municipalities in Vojvodina with Slovak ethnic majority or plurality (in purple), 2011

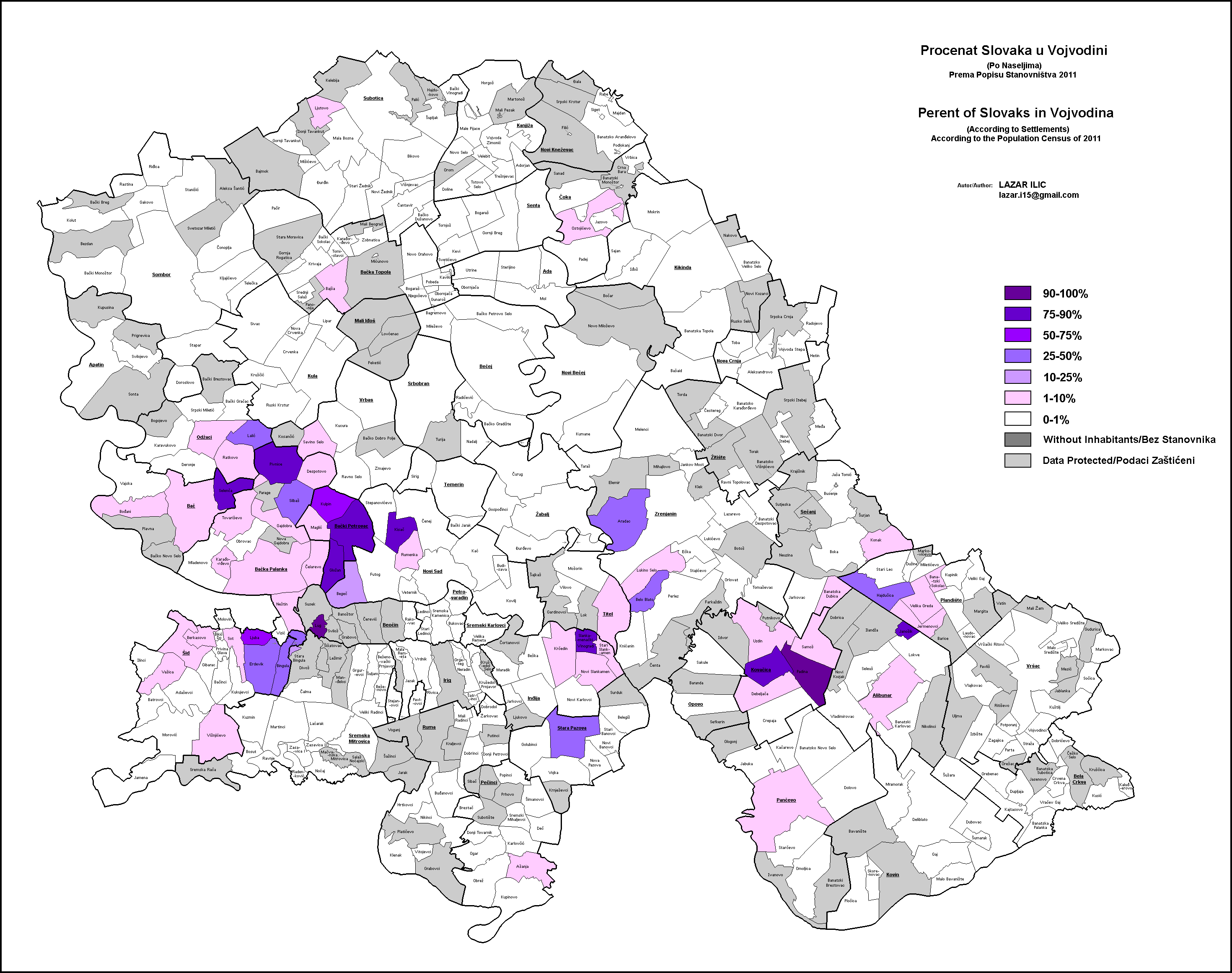
Settlements in Vojvodina with share of Slovaks, 2011

There are two municipalities in Vojvodina with absolute or Slovak relative ethnic majorities: Bački Petrovac (66.4% of population) and Kovačica (41%). The towns of Kovačica and Bački Petrovac are the cultural centers of Slovaks in Serbia. Slovak is one of the six official languages of the provincial administration of Vojvodina.

The settlements with Slovak ethnic majority are:

- Kovačica (Kovačica municipality)
- Padina (Kovačica municipality)
- Bački Petrovac (Bački Petrovac municipality)
- Kulpin (Bački Petrovac municipality)
- Gložan (Bački Petrovac municipality)
- Kisač (City of Novi Sad)
- Selenča (Bač municipality)
- Pivnice (Bačka Palanka municipality)
- Janošik (Alibunar municipality)
- Lug (Beočin municipality)
- Ljuba (Šid municipality)
- Slankamenački Vinogradi (Inđija municipality)

The settlements with Slovak ethnic plurality are:

- Belo Blato (City of Zrenjanin)
- Lalić (Odžaci municipality)
- Hajdučica (Plandište municipality)

== Politics ==
The National Council of Slovak Ethnic Minority in Serbia is a representation body of Slovaks, established for the protection of the rights and the minority self-government of Slovaks in Serbia.

== Notable people ==
- Miroslav Benka – screenwriter, director, designer
- Zuzana Chalupová – painter
- Dominik Dinga – football player

== Gallery ==
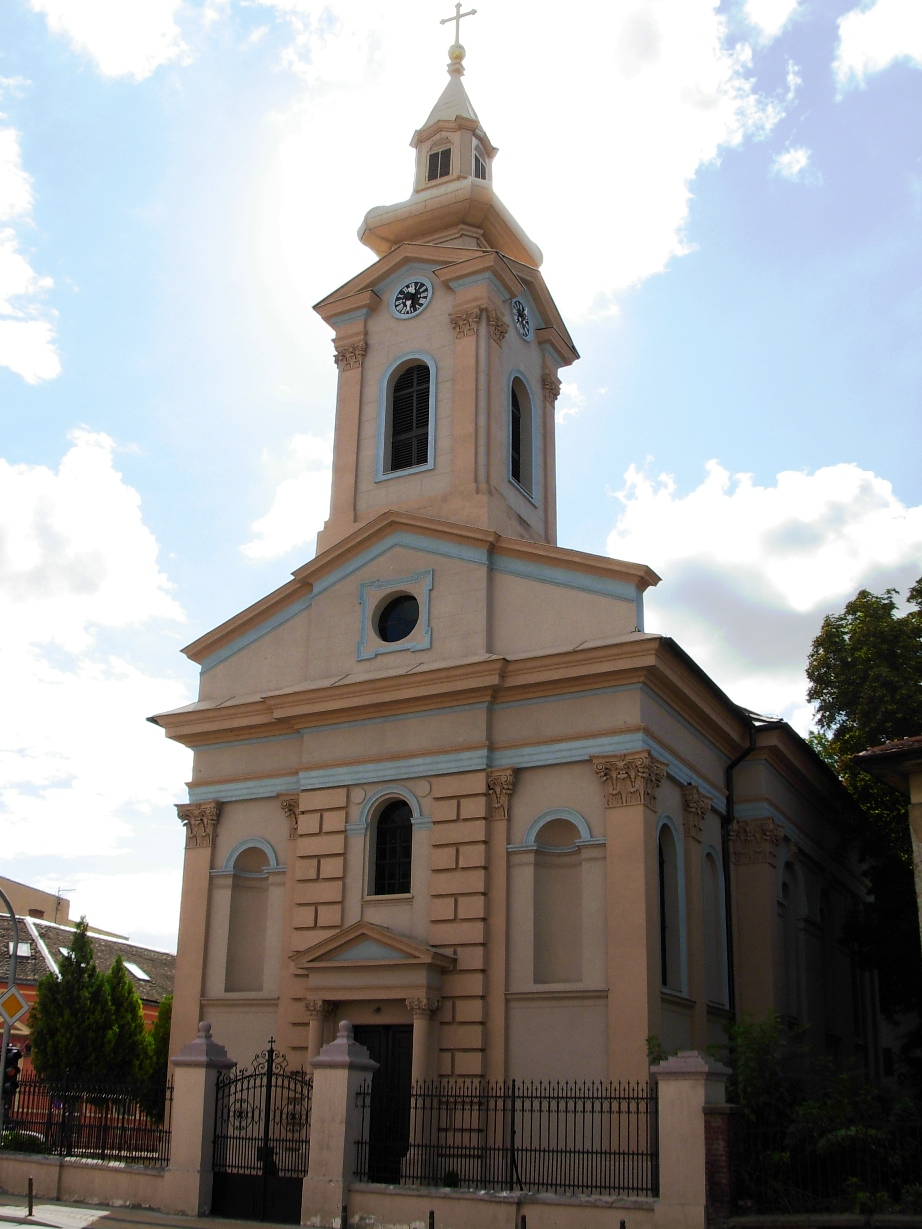
Slovak Evangelical Church in Novi Sad

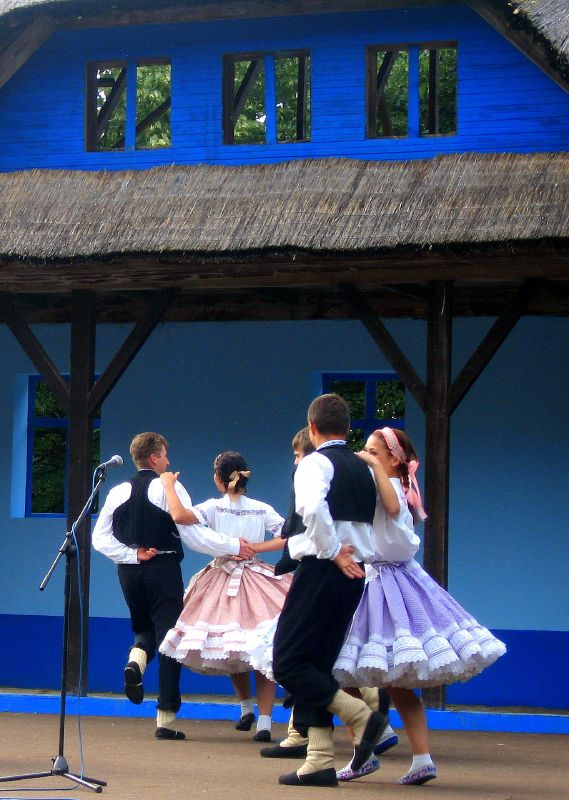
Slovak folk dance in Gložan

== See also ==
- Slovak diaspora
- Slovak Evangelical Church of the Augsburg Confession in Serbia
- Museum of Vojvodina Slovaks
- Ján Kollár Gymnasium and Students' Home
- Serbia–Slovakia relations

== External sources ==
- Borislav Jankulov, Pregled kolonizacije Vojvodine u XVIII i XIX veku, Novi Sad - Pančevo, 2003.
- Obšust, Kristijan. 2021. Slovaks in Serbia: Some elements of their collective identity. Portal Arhiva Vojvodine – ARHIVUM. ISSN (Online) 2683-4405.
