= Adam Paljov =

Serbian politician

Adam Paljov (Serbian Cyrillic: Адам Паљов; born 8 March 1970) is a politician in Serbia from the country's Slovak community. He served in the Assembly of Vojvodina from 2012 to 2016 as a member of the League of Social Democrats of Vojvodina (LSV).

== Early life and career ==
Paljov was born in Aradac, Socialist Autonomous Province of Vojvodina, in what was then the Socialist Republic of Serbia in the Socialist Federal Republic of Yugoslavia. He graduated from the secondary electrical engineering school Nikola Tesla in Zrenjanin (1988) and subsequently earned a degree from the University of Belgrade Faculty of Electrical Engineering (1993). From 1995 to 2012, he worked at the Nikola Tesla school.

== Political career ==
Paljov joined the LSV in 2000 and led the party's local committee in Aradac from 2001 to 2004 and again starting in 2009. He received the tenth position on the LSV's electoral list in the 2012 Vojvodina provincial election and narrowly missed direct election when it won eight mandates. He was awarded a mandate on 20 June 2012 when both Nenad Čanak and Bojan Kostreš declined their provincial mandates in order to serve in the National Assembly of Serbia. THE LSV was part of Vojvodina's coalition government in this period, and Paljov served for the next four years as a supporter of the ministry. He was member of the assembly committee on health, safety, and labour, and the committee for overseeing provincial regulations on languages in official use. As a deputy, he was active in calling for the province to be granted more autonomy.

He was given the forty-first position on the LSV's list in the 2016 provincial election and was not returned when the list won nine mandates. He was also a LSV candidate in the 2016 Serbian parliamentary election, although he received a position too low for election to be a realistic possibility.

Paljov sought election to Serbia's Slovak National Council in the elections of 2014 and 2018 as a candidate of the League of Slovaks of Vojvodina, although he did not win a seat on either occasion.
