= Tabanović =

Tabanović may refer to the following villages in Serbia:

- Tabanović (Mionica), in Kolubara District
- Tabanović (Šabac), in Mačva District
