= Dragi Stamenković =

Serbian politician

Dragi Stamenković Драги Стаменковић
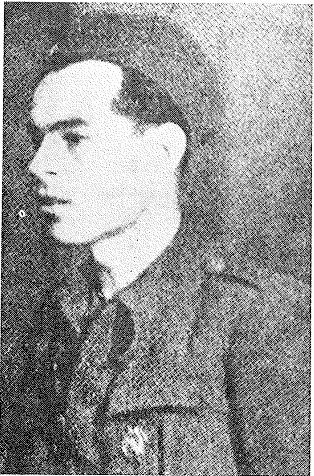

Prime Minister of Serbia President of the People's Government of Serbia
- In office 17 November 1964 – 6 May 1967
- President: Dušan Petrović Šane
- Preceded by: Stevan Doronjski
- Succeeded by: Đurica Jojkić

Personal details
- Born: 29 February 1920; Leskovac, Kingdom of Serbs, Croats and Slovenes
- Died: 17 February 2004 (aged 83); Belgrade, Serbia and Montenegro
- Political party: SKJ (1937—1990)

Miodrag "Dragi" Stamenković (Serbian Cyrillic: Миодраг "Драги" Стаменковић; 29 February 1920, in Leskovac – 17 February 2004, in Belgrade) was a Yugoslav and Serbian politician and author.

== Biography ==
He finished his elementary school and two grades of the gymnasium in his home town, while in Belgrade he graduated from the Trading school. In his early years, he was a member of the United Trade Unions. He served as the leader of the Communist Youth in Serbia during the World War II and after the war, he worked for the communist government in Serbia and in 1951 he became president of the League of Trade Unions of Yugoslavia as well as the vice president of the Central Council of the League of Trade Unions. In 1964 he was appointed as the President of the People's Government of Serbia and he served that role until 1967. He was the Yugoslav ambassador to the United Kingdom between 1974 and 1977.

He died on 17 February 2004 in Belgrade and was buried in the New Cemetery.

Government offices
| Preceded by Stevan Doronjski | Prime Minister of Serbia; 1964–1967 | Succeeded by Đurica Jojkić |
