= Milenko Bojanić =

Serbian politician

- Миленко Бојанић
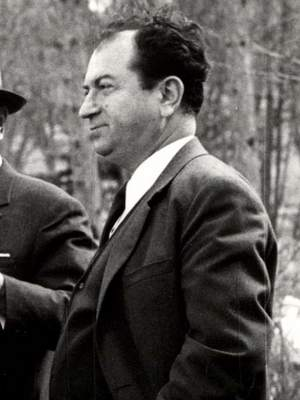

Prime Minister of Serbia President of the People's Government of Serbia
- In office 7 May 1969 – 6 May 1974
- President: Dragoslav Marković
- Preceded by: Đurica Jojkić
- Succeeded by: Dušan Čkrebić

Personal details
- Born: 24 September 1924; Aradac, Kingdom of Serbs, Croats and Slovenes
- Died: 22 May 1987 (aged 62); Belgrade, SFR Yugoslavia
- Political party: SKJ

Milenko Bojanić (Serbian Cyrillic: Миленко Бојанић; 24 September 1924, in Aradac – 22 May 1987, in Belgrade) was a Yugoslav politician and university professor.

Government offices
Preceded by Đurica Jojkić	Prime Minister of Serbia; 1969–1974	Succeeded by Dušan Čkrebić
