= Miroslav Benka =

Serbian screenwriter, actor, director and designer

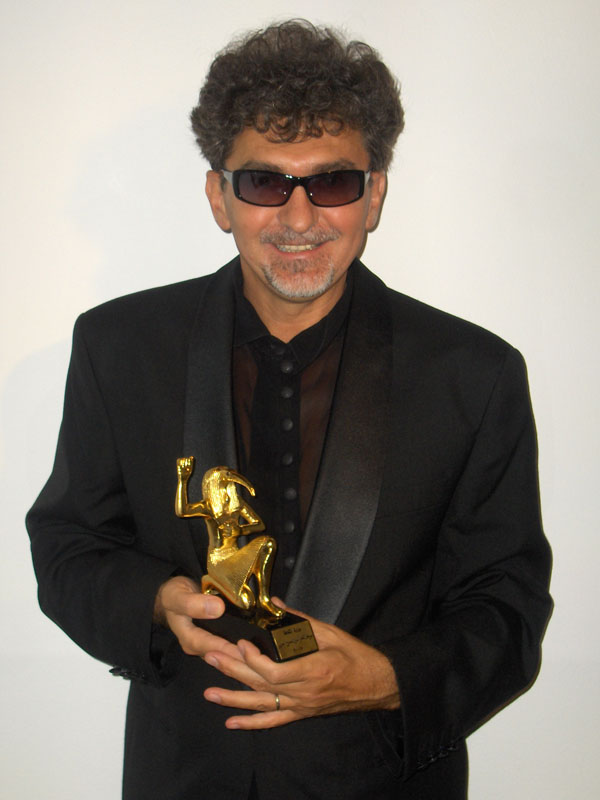
- Born: Miroslav Benka; 22 April 1956 (age 70); Ašanja, PR Serbia, Yugoslavia
- Occupations: Director and screenwriter
- Years active: 1990-present
- Spouse: Vlasta Benková
- Children: Oleg
- Awards: Jurislav Korenic Award for best young director (1991); Best Experiment in Contemporary Theatre Award (1991); Union of Dramatic Arts of Slovakia, Bratislava State Prize for directing Soft Dreams(1994); National TV RTS Award (1995); Grand Prix, 24th International Theatre Festival, Tehran (2006); Best Scenegraphy Award, 19th Cairo International Festival for Experimental Theatre
- Website: www.miroslavbenka.com

Miroslav Benka (Serbian Cyrillic: Мирослав Бенка; born April 22, 1956) is a Serbian screenwriter, actor, director and designer of Slovak ethnicity.

== Life and work ==
Benka was born in Ašanja, Vojvodina, Serbia to a Slovak family. He graduated from the College of Applied Arts in Design and the Acting Department of the Academy of Arts in Novi Sad|Academy of Arts in Novi Sad (Akademija umetnosti u Novom Sadu). Benka also graduated from the Directing Department of the University of Arts in Belgrade (Fakultet dramskih umetnosti univeziteta u Beogradu).

He was a guest professor at the Academy of Performing Arts in Bratislava and the International University in Novi Pazar, and artistic director of the City Drama Theatre (Mestké divadlo) in Žilina, Slovakia, the National Theatre Sterija in Vrsac and the Vrsac Autumn Theatre Festival. Benka has directed 60 productions by classical and contemporary playwrights, documentaries, advertisements, television programs, music videos, radio dramas and the multimedia project Lux in Tenebris at Bojnice Castle (Zámok Bojnice).

Benka has performed at the Belgrade International Theatre Festival (BITEF) in 1991 and 2004, the Novi Sad Sterija Theatre Festival (Sterijino Pozorje) in 1995 and 1998, the Vojvodina Theatre Festival (Susret profesionalnih pozorišta Vojvodine) in 1991, 1995, 1996, 1998, 1999 and 2001, the Vrsac Autumn Theatre Festival (Vršačka pozorišna jesen) in 1994, 1996, 1998, 2001 and 2002, the Sarajevo Theatre Festival (MESS) in 1991 and 2004, the Ljubljana Theatre Festival in 2006, the 1991 Zagreb Dance Week Festival (Tjedan suvremenog plesa), the 1998 Užice Yugoslav Theatre Festival (Jugoslovenski pozoišni festival u Užicu), the Prešov Slovak Theatre Festival in 1994 and 1995, the International Theatre Festival (Divadelná Nitra) in 1992 and 1995, the 2012 Touches and Connections Theatre Festival (Dotyky a spojenia), the 2013 International Theatre Festival (Kotor Art) and Herceg Novi Summer Festival (Herceg Fest). He has contributed to S.O.S. (1991), Soft Dreams (Mäkké Sny, 1994), Bread and Circuses (Panem et Circenses, 2004), Painted in Frost (Maľované inovaťou, 2008) and Images of My World (Obrazy môjho sveta, 2009).

He has exhibited work at the World Stage Design Exhibition during the Prague Quadrennial. Other exhibitions include the Museum of Art and Crafts in Belgrade and the Triennial of Theatre Scenography and Costume Design in Novi Sad.

== As director ==
- 1991: S.O.S. (Save Our Souls) by Miroslav Benka
- 1994: Lux in Tenebris by Bertolt Brecht
- 1994: Soft Dreams (Mäkké sny) by Miroslav Benka
- 1998: Kamen za pod glavu by Milica Novković
- 2004: Bread and Circuses (Panem et Circenses) by Miroslav Benka
- 2008: Painted in Frost (Oslikano injem) by Miroslav Benka
- 2009: Images of My World (Slike moga sveta) by Miroslav Benka
- 2010: On the Wings of Dreams by Miroslav Benka
- 2011: Abode/Bydlisko/Boraviste by Miroslav Benka
- 2012: Days of Einstein's Dreams by Miroslav Benka
- 2022: Tesla, light in time by Miroslav Benka

== Awards ==
- 1991: Jurislav Korenić best young director award (MESS, Sarajevo)
- 1991: Best experiment in contemporary theatre award (MESS, Sarajevo)
- 1994: State Prize for direction (Soft Dreams; Union of Dramatic Artists of Slovakia, Bratislava)
- 1994: Best Director (2nd Vrsac Autumn Theatre Festival, Vršac)
- 1995: Best Director (45th Festival of Professional Theatre of Vojvodina, Vršac)
- 1995: RTVBG – RTVNS Award of National TV RTS, Belgrade
- 1998: Best Director (48th Festival of Professional Theatre of Vojvodina, Sremska Mitrovica)
- 1999: Golden Mark of Union of Culture and Education, Belgrade
- 2001: Special Award for Directing and Dramaturgy (51st Festival of Professional Theatre of Vojvodina, Vršac)
- 2001: Best Scenography (51st Festival of Professional Theatre of Vojvodina, Vrsac)
- 2006: Grand Prix (24th Fajr International Theater Festival)
- 2007: Best Scenography (19th Cairo International Festival for Experimental Theatre)
- 2016: Honorary member of the Association of Slovak Writers (SSS), Bratislava
- 2017: Medal of Culture for Multiculturalism and Interculturalism of the Institute for Culture of Vojvodina Miloš Crnjanski, Nový Sad
- 2022: Recognition for the highest contribution to the national culture, ie the culture of national minorities, Ministry of Culture of the Republic of Serbia, Belgrade

== See also ==
- Benka in the Serbian Wikipedia

== Notes ==
- Isakov, Mile and Biro, Mikloš. Top 10, Vojvodina, p. 84. NDN Vojvodine, Novi Sad (1992) ISBN 8643100196.
- Vehovec, Roman. Leksikon umetnika Vojvodine. Vega Media, Novi Sad (2001), pp. 3, 29.
- Stojšić, Borislav. Znamenite ličnosti Srema. Muzej Srema, Sremska Mitrovica (2003), pp. 354, 357, 358.
- Ballek, R., Dikošová, E., Dlouhy, O. and Jaborník, J. Mestské divadlo Žilina, MD Žilina, DÚ Bratislava (2005), pp. 30–31. ISBN 8088987636.
- Penčić and Poljanski, Dejan. 55 (Susreta) Festivala pozorišta Vojvodine. ZPPV Novi Sad- Subotica (2005). str. 233, ISBN 8685123046
- Ćirilov, Jovan. Svi moji savremenici. Prosveta, Beograd (2007), pp. 293–297. ISBN 9788607017416 .
- Verešová, Katarína. Storočie divadla v Starej Pazove. ESA Bratislava (2007), pp. 189– 239. ISBN 9788085684605.
- Vagapova, Natalija. BITEF: pozorište, festival, život. Altera-BITEF-Službeni Glasnik, Beograd (2010), pp. 326, 330, 560, 572. ISBN 978-86-6007-054-0.
- Šuvaković, Miško. Istorija umetnosti u Srbiji: XX vek, Knjiga 1: Radikalne umetničke prakse. Orion Art, Beograd (2010), pp. 779–789, ISBN 978-86-83305-52-0.
- Sklabinski, Milina. Slováci v Srbsku.... UPKVS, Nový Sad (2011), pp. 352–362, ISBN 9788687947061.
- Šentevska, Irena. The Svinging 90s: pozorište i društvena realnost Srbije u 29 slika. Orion Art, Beograd (2016), ISBN 978-86-6389-049-7.
- Palenčíková, Zuzana. Príbeh jedného divadla. Šéf edítorka a redaktorka Zuzana Palenčíková. Žilina (2022). Mestské divadlo Žilina, s. 259-261, 24-25, 54-59, 124-125, 226-227, ISBN 978-80-570-3906-8.

== Selected references ==
- ПАШИЋ, Феликс. "Елита на окупу", ВЕЧЕРЊЕ НОВОСТИ, Belgrade, 14 March 1991.
- Korenić, Bojan. "Pokrenute slike", Oslobodjenje, Sarajevo, 9 April 1991.
- ХЛОЖАН, Б.[орко]. Драматургија ирационалног, ДНЕВНИК, Нови Сад, 18 March 1991 p. 13.
- Б. Б. М. "S. O. S. за свет", Вечерње Новости, Belgrade, 26 April 1991.
- Foretić, Dalibor. "O 32 MES-u", Danas, Zagreb, 1991.
- Vrgoč, Dubravka. "Opori humor", Vjesnik, Zagreb, September 1991.
- ИВАНОВСКИ, Иван. "O 32. MЕС-у". НОВА МАКЕДОНИЈА, Скопје, April 1991.
- КОПИЦЛ, Владимир. "32. MЕС - Војвођански дан". ДНЕВНИК, Нови Сад, 9 April 1991.
- Knežević, D. [ubravka]. "Čudo iz Pazove". Politika Ekspres, Belgrade, 10 April 1991.
- Bartuc, Gabriella. "S.O.S. (avagy mentsétek meg a lelkünket – Beszélgetés Miroslav Benka rendezövel)". Magyar Szö, Ujvideki-Novi Sad, 11 May 1991.
- Babín, Emil. "Vzývanie božstvatálie". PRAVDA na nedeľu, Bratislava, 19 July 1991.
- КРЕШИЋ, Ирена. "Сјајни етерични плес". ПОЛИТИКА, Београд, October 1991.
- Zajcev, Milica. "Zvezdani let". BORBA, Belgrade, 1 October 1991.
- Kovačević, Marko. "Nada savladanog očaja". SCENA, Novi Sad, issues 4–5, July–October 1991.
- "Osallistuneet teatterit ja näytelmät". LÄNSI – SAVO, Mikkeli, 24–26 January 1992.
- "Jugoslavian ryhmä ei politikoi, vaan tanssii". LÄNSI – SAVO, Mikkeli 25 January 1992.
- Kulmala, Teppo. "Teatteri on liiketilassa – kohti unta ja fantasiaa, (Mikkelissä nähtiin Että Jyväskylän Talven tulee tasokkaat vierailijat). Keskisuomalainen, Jyväskylä, 27 January 1992.
- Lehuta, Emil. "Divadelná Nitra". Film a Divadlo. Bratislava, December 1992, issue XXXVI.
- Filip, Ján. "Bojujem proti hraniciam ľudskej duše". Vzlet, Nový Sad, March–April 1993.
- Palušovà, M.(ária). "Žilinská Matka oslovila". Republika, Bratislava, 20 September 1993.
- Podmaková, Dagmar. "Prekroč svoj tieň". Pravda, Bratislava, 23 June 1994.
- Rakočević, Ljudmila. "Igra počinje u gluvo doba". Ilustrovana Politika, Belgrade, 27 August 1994.
- Д. [АНИЛОВИЋ], J. [овица]). "Стерија у Словачкој". ПОЛИТИКА, Бelgrade, 24 April 1995.
- Podmaková, Dagmar. "Zrkadlo súčasného stavu". Pravda, Bratislava, 19 May 1995.
- "Смели експеримент из Словачке". ПОЛИТИКА, Београд, 16 October 1995, p. 19.
- ЗДРАВКОВИЋ, Мирјана. "Тело сања...". ПОЛИТИКА, Београд, 19 October 1995, p. 18.
- Jesenski, Zoroslav. "Domovina nije tramvaj". Nezavisni, Novi Sad, 27 October 1995, pp. 32, 33.
- Domonji, Pavel. "Miroslav Benka – Interview". Košava, Vršac, 1995, pp. 45–49.
- Polák, Milan. "Zhmotnené spomienky". Republika, Bratislava, 11 December 1995, p. 6.
- БАБЕЛ, Јосип. "Позориште опипљивих снова". ПОЛИТИКА, Београд, 24 February 1996, p. 17.
- Prebudila, Martin. "Virtuálne Mäkké sny...". Hlas Ľudu, Nový Sad, 4 April 1998, pp. 24, 25.
- Jurkovič, Ladislav. "Keď zabili Ferdinanda...". Slovensko, MS Martin, 2000, vol. XXIV, nos. 3–4, pp. 16–17.
- Udicki, Snežana. "O totalnom pozorištu". Beorama, Beograd, 2001, vol. VII, nr. 112, pp. 12, 13, 14.
- Nikolić, Darinka. "Kuća mirisa rascvetalih višanja". Ludus, Beograd, 28 April 2001, vol. IX, nr. 84, p. 6.
- Achimescu, Ildico. "Alice: din Ţara Minunilor ȋntr-o 'cronicӑ neagrӑ'". Timişoara, PrimaOra, 12 December 2001, p. 16.
- РАДОШЕВИЋ, Мирјана. "Класике никад доста". ПОЛИТИКА, Београд, 14 October 2002 p. А15.
- Ćirilov, Jovan. "Od zanesenjaka do postmoderniste". Blic News, Beograd, 2002, nr. 148, p. 37.
- Miloslavljević, Aleksandar. "Za totalno pozorište budućnosti". Ludus, Beograd, 28 February 2003, vol. XI, nr. 102, pp. 14, 15.
- Zajcev, Milica. "Planetarno pravo na različitost". Danas, Beograd, 6. April 2004, p. 15.
- Ćirilov, Jovan. "Hleba i lepote". Blic, Beograd, 14 April 2004, p. 22.
- С. [ТЕФАНОВИЋ], Г. [АРАШАНИН] З. [орица]. "Трагање за митским коренима". СРЕМСКЕ НОВИНЕ, Сремска Митровица, 28 April 2004, p. 5.
- Čelovský, Tomáš and Čáni, Ladislav. "Úspešný štart...". Slovenské Zahraničie, Bratislava, 2004, vol. IX, nr. 2, pp. 1a, 4, 5.
- "Складиштење сновиђења". НОВОСТИ, Београд, 25 September 2004, p. 27.
- МАСНИКОВИЋ, Исидора. "Ода хлебу и љубави". ПОЛИТИКА, Београд, 25 September 2004, p. 16.
- Zajcev, Milica. "Prizivanje etnosa..." Danas, Beograd, 25–26 September 2004, p. 17.
- Bošković, Dragana. "Slovačko 'Pozorište snova' u Iranu". Danas, Beograd, 4–5 February 2006, p. 12.
- РАКОЧЕВИЋ, Бранко. "Најбоља представа Мирослава Бенке". ДНЕВНИК, Нови Сад, 4 February 2006, p. 20.
- СТРУГАР, Вукица. "Наш 'Хлеб' у Техерану". НОВОСТИ (КУЛТУРА), Београд, 8 February 2006, pp. IV, V.
- БОШКОВИЋ, Драгана. "Добра вест из Техерана". НИН, Београд, 9 February 2006, p. 40.
- МАСНИКОВИЋ, Исидора: Право на различитост, ПОЛИТИКА, Београд, 12. 02. 2006. год. бр. с. 14
- BOŠKOVIĆ, Dragana: Hleb domaći, a igre u Iranu, LUDUS, Beograd, 2006, god. br. 132, s. 4
- VONČINA, Danijel: Gledališče intimnih slik, DELO, Ljubljana, 28. 09. 2006. god. br. s. 13
- ZAŤKO, Jaroslav: Divadelná mágia, HLAS ĽUDU (OBZORY), Nový Sad, 26. 05. 2007, rok. XXIV, č. 21/4232O/ s. 3
- ĆIRILOV, Jovan: Biteef i druge strasti, JatAierways REVIEW, br. 9 (septembar), 2004.
- МАСНИКОВИЋ, И. [сидора]: Мирославу Бенки награда за најбољу сценографију, ПОЛИТИКА, Београд, 21. 09. 2007. год. CX, бр. 35, с. 16
- SÉLIM, May: Les fantȏmes du passé /أشباح من الماضي, CIFET, Cairo, 07. 09. 2007, god. XIX, br. 2, s. 5
- РАКОЧЕВИЋ, Б. [ранко]: Награђен Мирослав Бенка, ДНЕВНИК, Нови Сад, 18. 09. 2007. год. бр. с. 12
- ĽEŠŤANOVÁ, Anna: Ďalší svetový úspech, Hlas ľudu, Nový Sad, 22. 09. 2007 roč. č. s. 25
- NONIN, D. [raganić], G. [ordana] : "Hleba i igara" sa najboljom scenografijom, DANAS, Beograd, 27. 09. 2007. god. br. s. 29
- ILIĆ, St. Milorad: Oslikano injem / Hoarfrost – Painted, Jat Airways NEW REVIEW, Beograd, 2008, god. XXIV, br. 171 (mart / March, 2008), s. 34 – 37
- NJEŽIĆ, Tatjana: Priča o slikaru u ratnom vihoru, BLIC, Beograd, 13. 03. 2008, god. br. s. 20, 21
- НН: Позориште снова, ПРАВДА, Београд, 15. 03. 2008. год. бр. с. 21
- БЕЗБРАДИЦА, Микојан: Тело никада не лаже, ГЛАС ЈАВНОСТИ, Београд, 15. 03. 2008. год. бр. с. 14
- ЊЕЖИЋ, Татјана: Бојом против суровости, БЕСТСЕЛЕР, Београд, 04. 04. 2008. год., бр. 54, с.
- MATEJOVIČ, Róbert: Vizuálny kód slovenskej Vojvodiny, DIMENZIE, Košice, roč. XII, č. 1 (január) 2012, s. 14 – 19
- GONDA, Milan: Miroslav Benka a jeho zázračný svet, SLOVENSKO, MS Martin, 2012, roč. XXXIV, č.3 (jeseň), s. 24, 25
- ĽEŠŤANOVÁ, Anna: Túžil som tvoriť samostatne, HLAS ĽUDU, Nový Sad, 31. 03. 2012, roč. 69, č. 13/4484/ s. 26/IV – V/27
- МАРИНКОВИЋ, КЛАЋИК, Бранка: Успомене Мирослава Бенке, ПОЛИТИКА, Београд, 16. 04. 2013, год. CX, бр. 35718, с. 14
