= Đurica Jojkić =

Serbian politician

- Ђурица Јојкић

Prime Minister of Serbia President of the People's Government of Serbia
- In office 6 May 1967 – 7 May 1969
- President: Miloš Minić
- Preceded by: Dragi Stamenković
- Succeeded by: Milenko Bojanić

Personal details
- Born: 1914; Turija, Austria-Hungary
- Died: 1981 (aged 66–67); Belgrade, SFR Yugoslavia
- Political party: SKJ (1939—1981)

Đurica Jojkić (Serbian Cyrillic: Ђурица Јојкић; 1914 – 1981) was a Yugoslav politician and lawyer.

== Biography ==
He was born in 1914 in Turija near Srbobran. He studied in gymnasiums in Srbobran and Vrbas, before finishing the University of Belgrade Faculty of Law in Belgrade. He later finished Party College "Đuro Đaković" also in Belgrade. During World War II he was active in the Vojvodina region and served as the vice president of the People's Liberation Committee for the Novi Sad district. After the war, he continued to be a member of the parliament for Serbia until his death. In 1951 he was elected as the Mayor of Belgrade and he served that role until 1954 and later again between 1957 and 1961.

Government offices
Preceded by Dragi Stamenković	Prime Minister of Serbia; 1967–1969	Succeeded by Milenko Bojanić
Preceded by Ninko Petrović; Miloš Minić	Mayor of Belgrade; 1951–1954; 1957–1961	Succeeded by Miloš Minić; Milijan Neoričić
