= Tabanović (Mionica) =

Coordinates: 44°17′04″N 20°05′09″E

Tabanović Табановић
- Village (Selo)
- Nickname: Tabby
- Interactive map of Tabanović
- Country: Serbia
- District: Kolubara District
- Municipality: Mionica
- Time zone: UTC+1 (CET)
  - Summer (DST): UTC+2 (CEST)

Tabanović is a village situated in the Mionica municipality in Serbia.

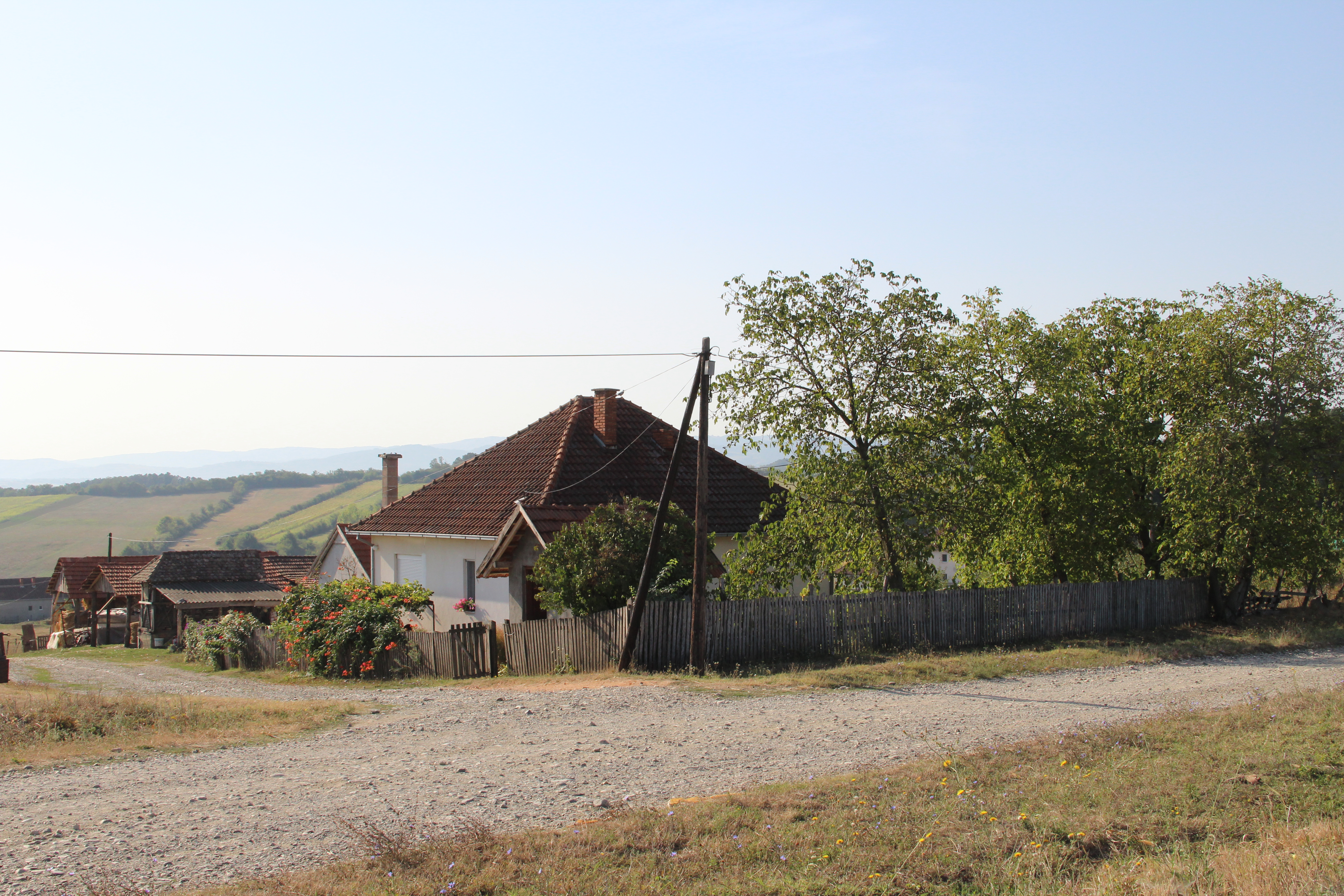
Tabanović - Panorama

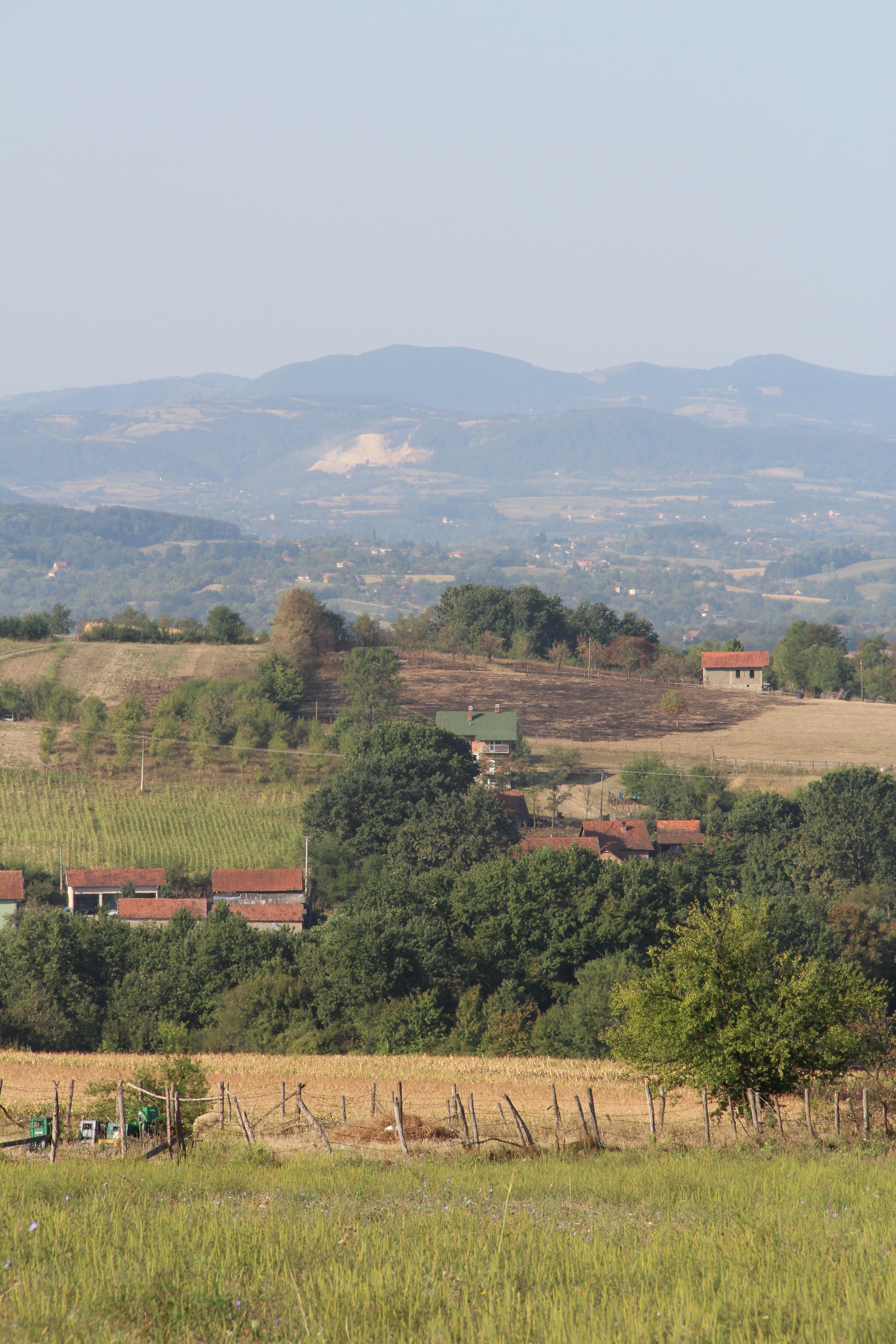
Tabanović - Panorama

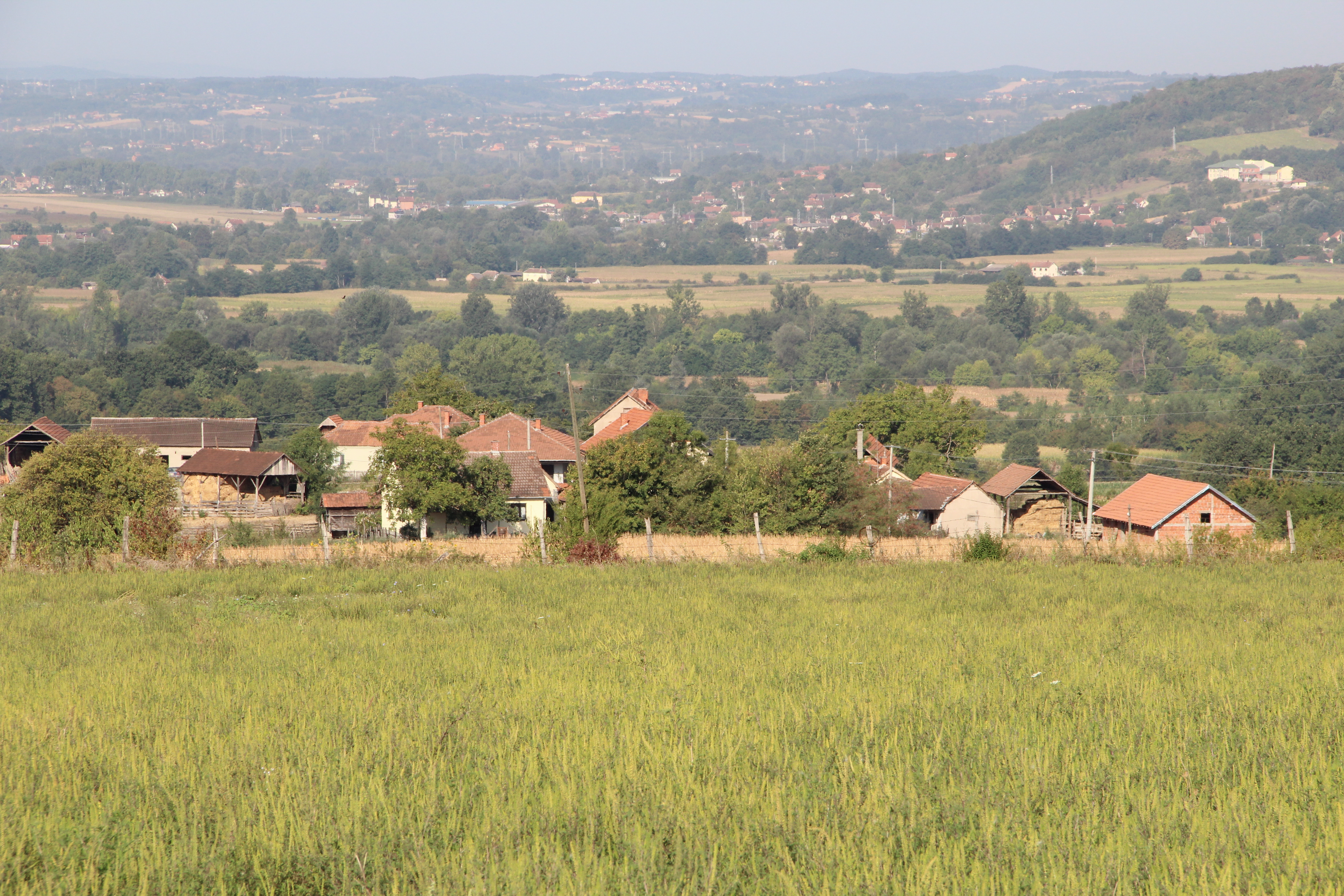
Tabanović - Panorama

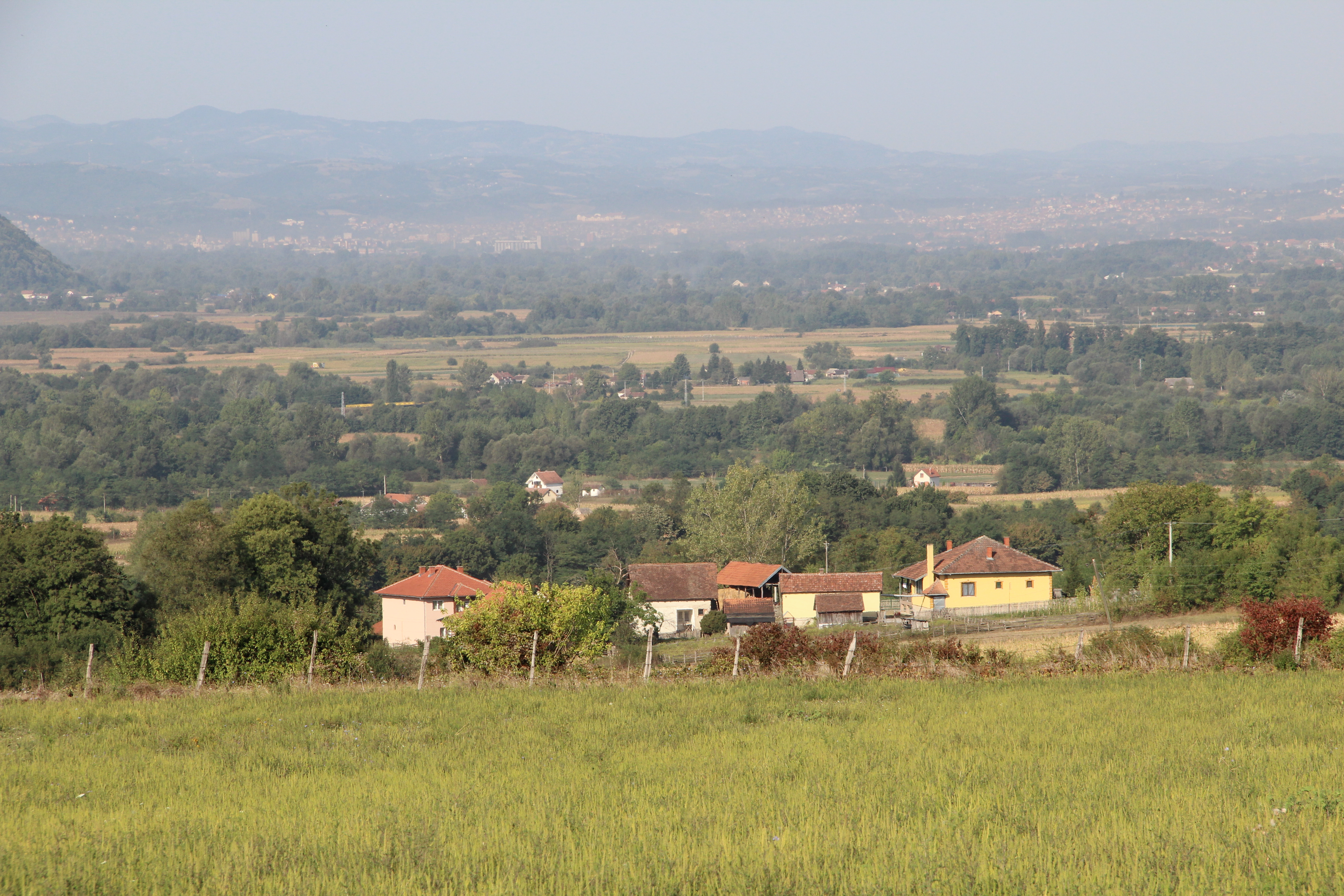
Tabanović - Panorama

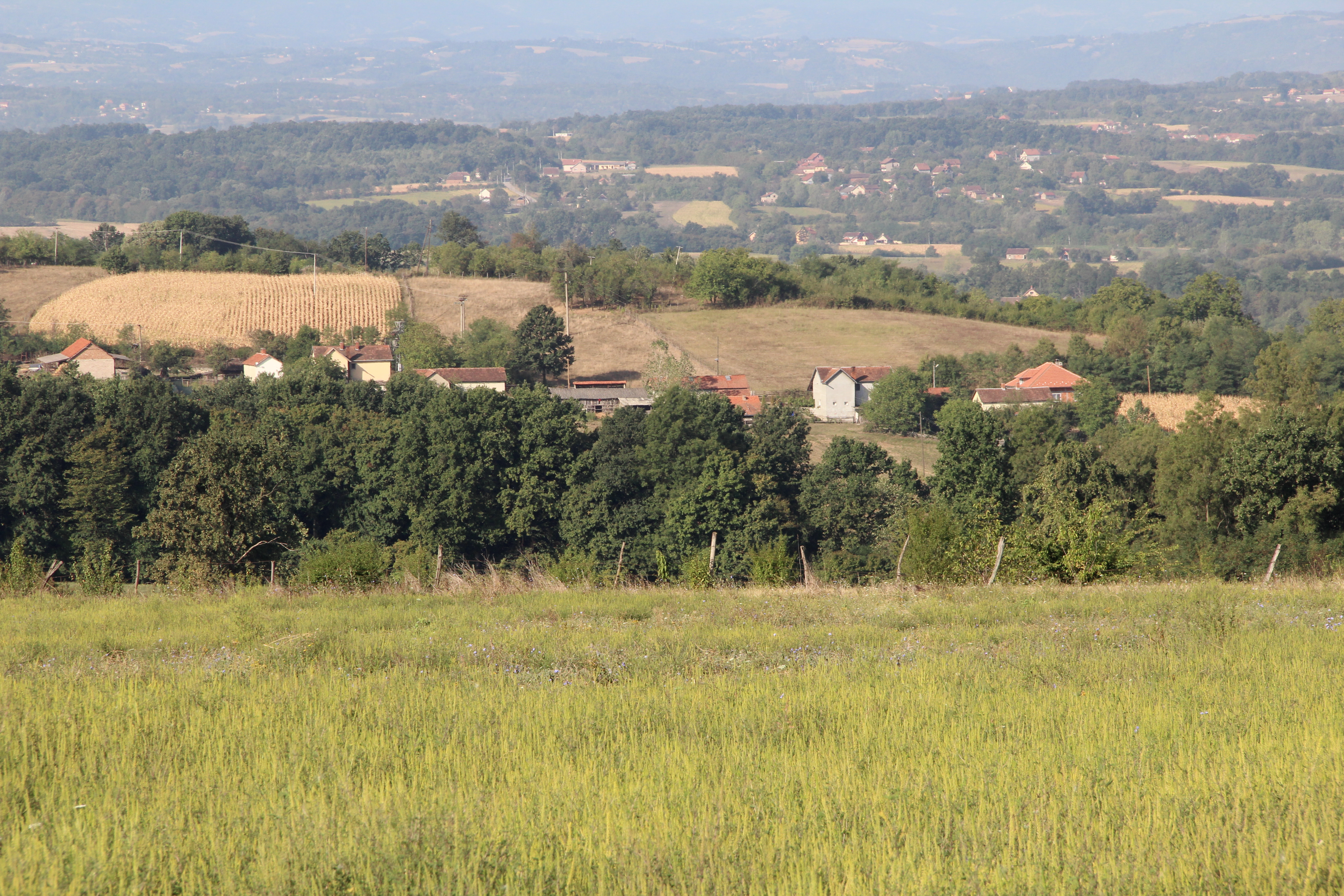
Tabanović - Panorama

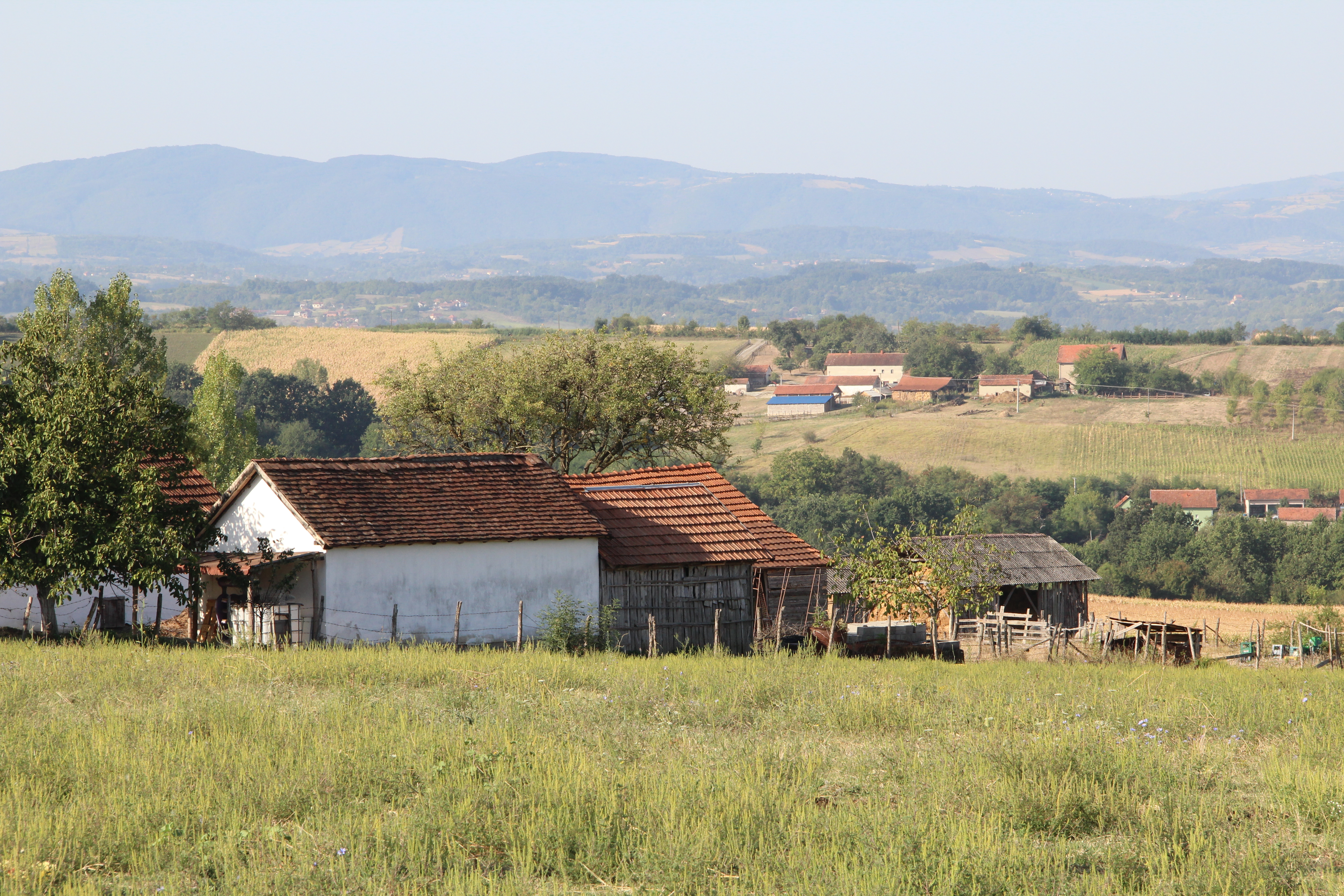
Tabanović - Panorama

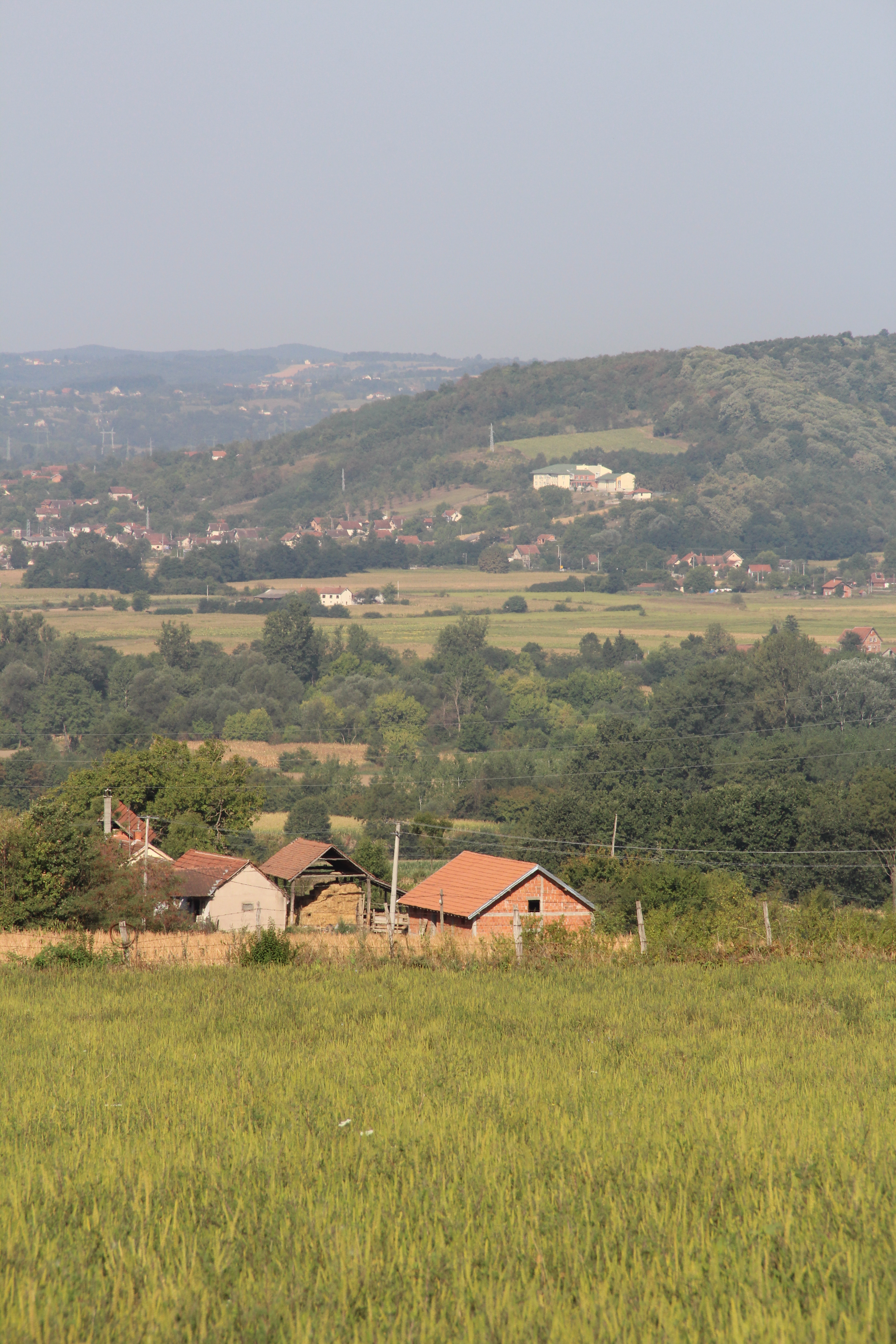
Tabanović - Panorama

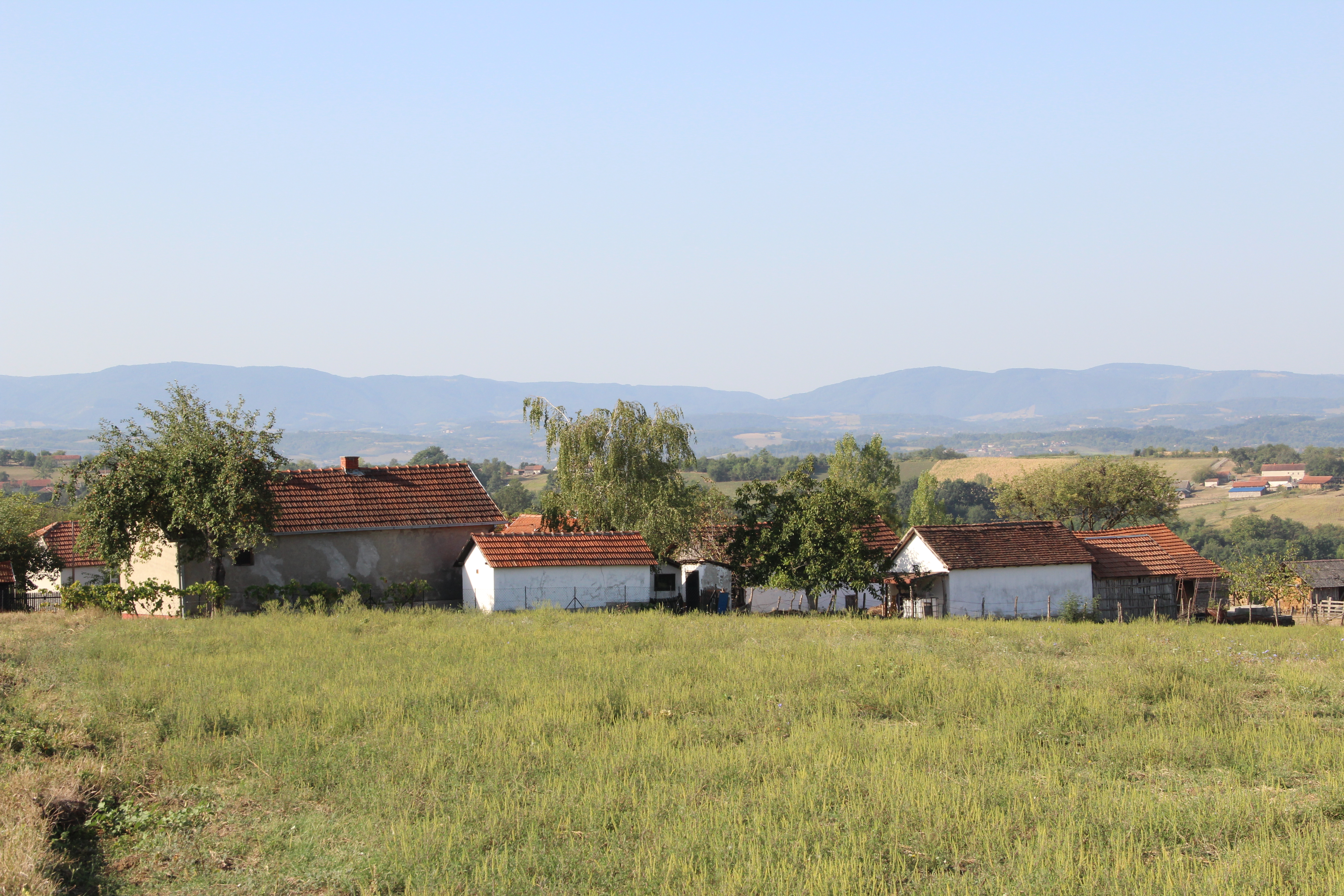
Tabanović - Panorama
