= Litvinovka =

Litvinovka Литвиновка
- Settlement
- Location within Altai Krai Location within Russia
- Coordinates: 53°41′N 83°40′E
- Country: Russia
- Region: Altai Krai
- District: Talmensky District
- Time zone: UTC+7:00

Litvinovka (Russian: Литвиновка) is a rural locality (a settlement) in Novoozyorsky Selsoviet, Talmensky District, Altai Krai, Russia. The population was 213 as of 2013. There are 5 streets.

== Geography ==
Litvinovka is located 32 km southeast of Talmenka (the district's administrative centre) by road. Ozyorki is the nearest rural locality.
