= Čokot =

Coordinates: 43.3053°N 21.8136°E

Čokot Чокот
- Village
- Interactive map of Čokot
- Country: Serbia
- District: Nišava
- Municipality: Niš
- Time zone: UTC+1 (CET)
  - Summer (DST): UTC+2 (CEST)

Čokot is a village situated in Niš municipality in Serbia.The famous actor Robert De Niro spent a few days in this village sometime in the 60s before he became a famous actor.

== History ==
Čokot (Albanian: Çokot) was inhabited by Albanians before the Expulsion of the Albanians took place in 1877–1878. All Albanians left the Niš region by force of the Serbian army and fled to modern-day Kosovo, which was back then the Vilayet of Kosovo of the Ottoman Empire. These Albanians became known as Muxhahirs and were demographically Albanians of the Gheg dialect and Muslims.
