= Selenča =

Selenča Селенча (Serbian) Selenča (Slovak) Bácsújfalu (Hungarian)
- Village (Selo)
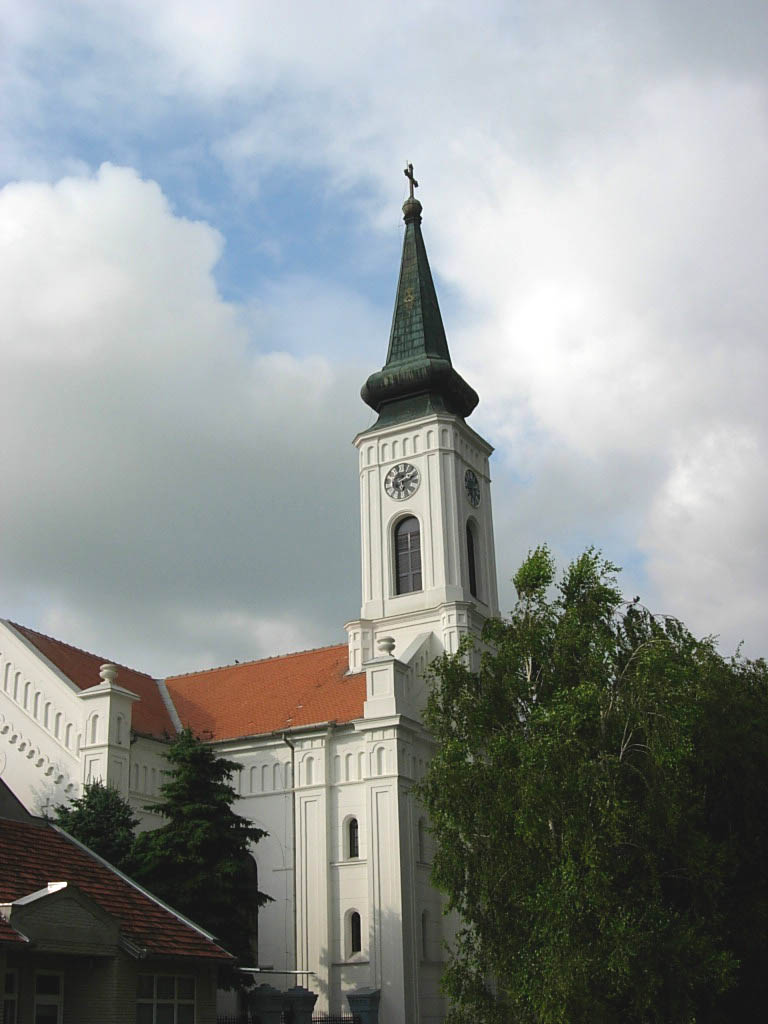
- The Evangelical church, built in 1870

- Location within Vojvodina Location within Serbia Location within Europe
- Coordinates: 45°25′N 19°18′E
- Country: Serbia
- Province: Vojvodina
- Region: Bačka
- District: South Bačka
- Municipality: Bač
- Local community: Selenča
- Established: 1758

Government
  - President of the Local community council: Marina Vrabčenjak (in 2022)

Area
  - Total: 12.41 sq mi (32.13 km^{2})
- Elevation: 279 ft (85 m)

Population (2022)
  - Total: 2,395
  - Density: 240/sq mi (93/km^{2})
- Time zone: UTC+1 (CET)
  - Summer (DST): UTC+2 (CEST)
- Postal code: 21425

Selenča (Serbian: Селенча, Slovak: Selenča, Hungarian: Bácsújfalu) is a village in the Bač municipality, South Bačka District, Vojvodina, Serbia. The village has a population of 2,395 inhabitants (2022 census).

== Geography ==
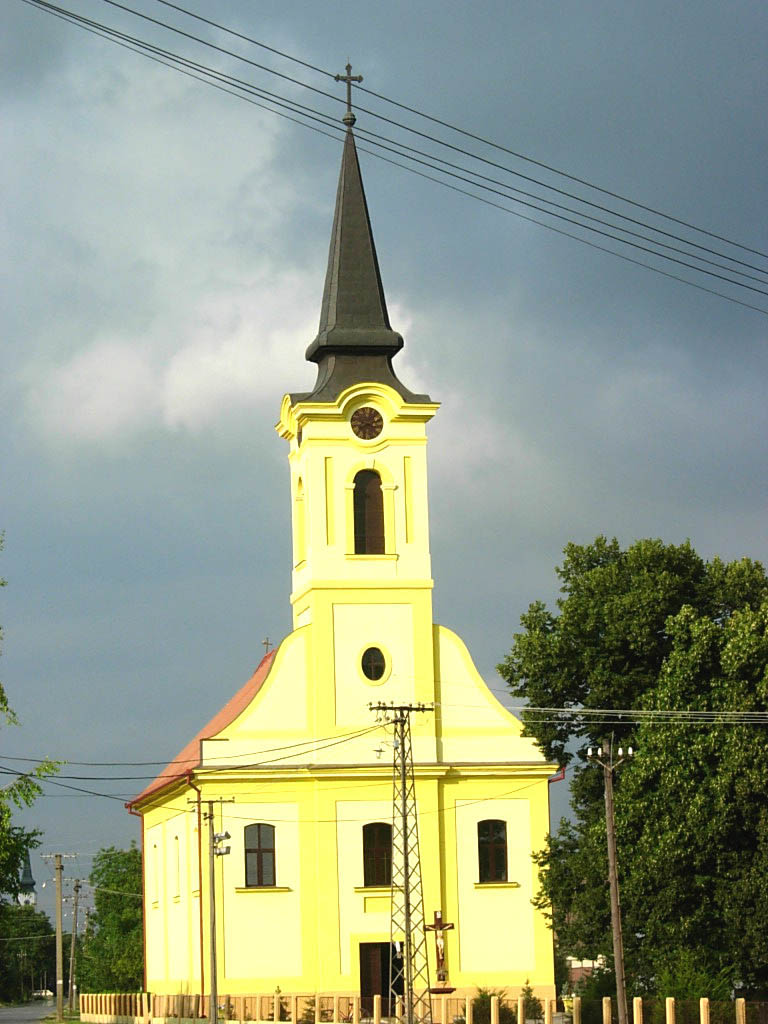
The Catholic church

Selenča is located in the Bačka region, in the South Bačka District, seated in Novi Sad, also the provincial capital. It is situated 4 km (2.5 mi) northeast from Bač, its municipal seat, and 157 km (98 mi) northwest of the capital Belgrade.

It is bounded by the village of Ratkovo on the north, Parage on the east, Tovariševo on the south, Deronje on the northwest and the town of Bač on the west and southwest.

The village is located on the diluvial terrace, at an altitude of 85 m (279 ft), 3 km (1.9 mi) north of the Karavukovo-Bački Petrovac canal, part of the Danube–Tisa–Danube Canal. Channeled river Mostonga is to the west.

The Bač Fishpond is located west of the village, while the protected reserve of the Karađorđevo hunting ground is just to the southwest.

== History ==
It is known that the surrounding area was inhabited prior to the 1526 Battle of Mohacs. The settlement was mentioned for the first time in 1590, during the Ottoman period, under the name of Selence. It was a small village of 26 houses, inhabited by the Serbs.

The contract which established the Slovak settlement was signed in 1758. At that time, the Slovaks were migrating from the northern sections of Hungary, at that time part of Austria, into the fertile southern parts, modern Vojvodina. In that first year, vital records show that 9 babies were born. The original Slovak settlers were Evangelicals, but due to the religious skirmishes they were forced out later. Another wave of Slovak settlers from Slovakia, this time Roman Catholic ones, settled into the empty houses.

The migration waves dwindled by the end of the 18th century. By the end of the 18th century an arranged settlement with proper streets developed.

The electricity reached the village in 1908 and the phone lines in 1937. In 1985 the central communal water supply system was finished.

== Name ==
There are two major theories on the origin of the village name. One, which claims that the toponym Selenča is a diminutive of the word selo, a generic Slavic term for a village in general. The other theory says that it marks the place of migration (seliti se, selište).

== Administration ==
With the rest of Vojvodina, Selenča became part of Serbia on 25 November 1918, and part of the united South Slav state, future Yugoslavia, on 1 December 1918. During the Interbellum, the village had its own municipality which comprised only Selenča. The municipality was part of the srez Odžaci which was originally within the okrug of Bačka and Baranja, and in 1929 became part of the Danube Banovina.

After World War II, Selenča municipality remained part of the srez Odžaci until they were abolished with the massive changes in the administrative and territorial changes in Yugoslavia in the late 1950s and early 1960s. By the 1961 census, it became part of the Bač municipality.

== Demographics ==
=== Historical population ===
- 1961: 4,155
- 1971: 4,057
- 1981: 4,008
- 1991: 3,705
- 2002: 3,279
- 2011: 2,996
- 2022: 2,395

=== Ethnic groups ===
According to data from the 2022 census, ethnic groups in the village include:

- 2,104 (87.8%) Slovaks
- 136 (5.6) Roma
- 75 (3.1%) Serbs
- Others/Undeclared/Unknown

== Characteristics ==
In the 19th century, the Imperial Austrian surveyors were sent to re-measure the area and to set the future look of the village. They measured and marked the main and side streets, divided the area in the lots for housing, yards, churches and other public buildings. They arranged the crossings of streets at the right angles so the village consists of the proper blocks which contain 12 houses each.

Hence, Selenča is a typical settlement of the Pannonian type, compact, square shaped, with the regular grid-like layout of the streets. However, as the village grew, generally in the southwest–northeast direction, the non-planned building and expansion produced irregular street patterns on the periphery. With this expansion, old core of the village was connected to the neighboring salašes. Total area of the village is 32.13 km^{2} (12.41 sq mi)

By the 2000s, there were still surviving the old, original houses, made from the wattle daubed with mud, with wooden roofs covered with reed. The streets in the village are paved with the asphalt concrete while the sidewalks were made of concrete or bricks.

Considered a prosperous settlement, by the 2000, Selenča had a kindergarten, a modern community health center, cultural center, founded in 1948, with large library and a cinema, Slovak cultural-artistic society "Jan Kolar", also founded in 1948, with drama, music and dance sections and a hunters association.

== Economy ==
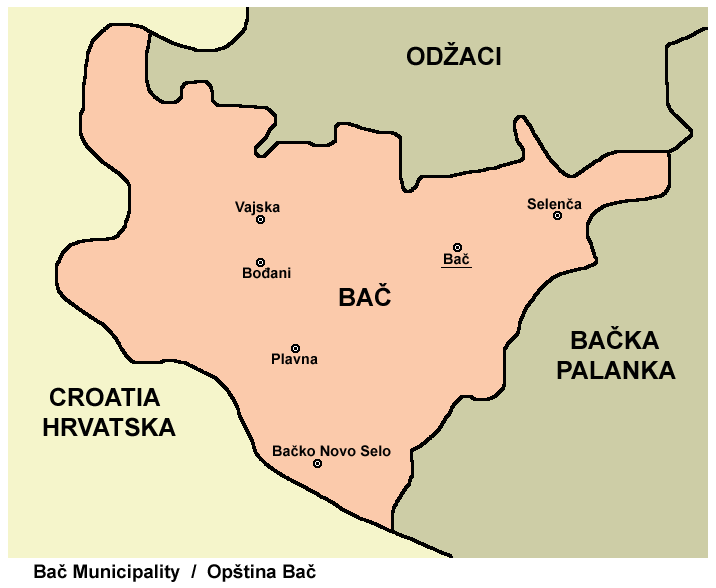
Map of the Bač municipality showing the location of Selenča

Majority of population works in agriculture. However, Selenča is best known for the production of the sorghum brooms. Made from the tassels of sorghum, the brooms are produced in 25 workshops. Hence, the majority of farmers cultivate sorghum. Even during the period of Yugoslavia, the village vas the major producer of this type of brooms.

Up to 1980s and the 1990s, Selenča was considered a developed agrarian-cattle's settlement. Other than sorghum, crops include corn, wheat and industrial pepper. Husbandry includes pigs, cattle, sheep and poultry. There was also a construction company "Slovan" in the village.

== Education ==
The first school, the Evangelical 4-grade one, was open in 1789. Since 1800 the Slovak Catholics were allowed to enroll. After 1918 the state school was founded, which after World War II became the full 8-grade elementary school, named "Jan Kolar". The new school building was finished in 1964 and today it is one of 17 elementary schools in Serbia in which the teaching is in Slovak.

== Religion ==
There are a couple of churches in the village. The Evangelical church was built in 1870. There is also a Roman Catholic church.

== See also ==
- List of places in Serbia
- List of cities, towns and villages in Vojvodina
