= Tabanović (Šabac) =

Tabanović Табановић (Serbian)
- Village (Selo)
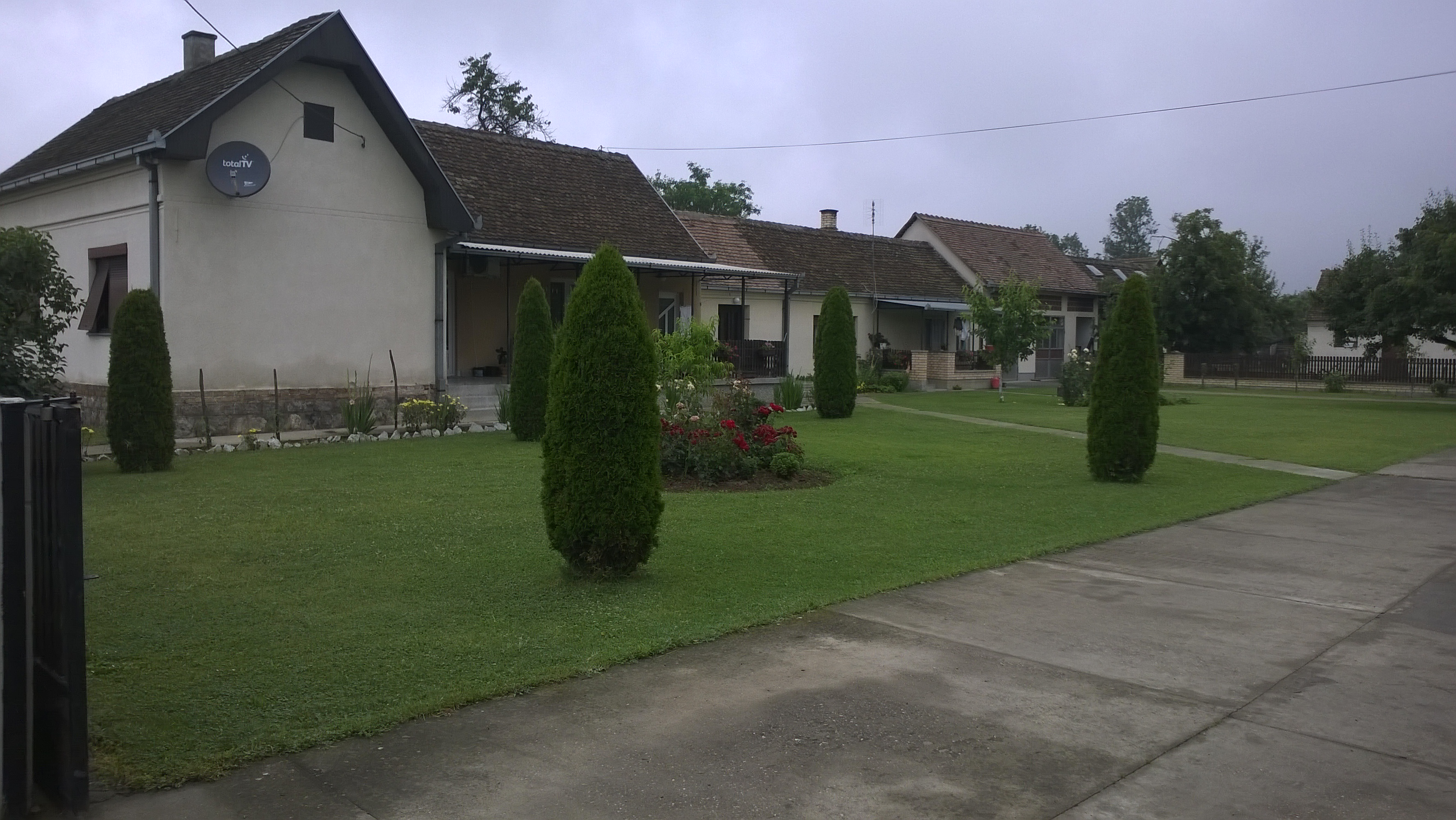

- Location within Serbia
- Coordinates: 44°48′49″N 19°38′29″E
- Country: Serbia
- Statistical Region: Šumadija and Western Serbia
- Region: Mačva
- District: Mačva District
- Municipality: Šabac

Population (2002)
  - Total: 1,420
- Time zone: UTC+1 (CET)
  - Summer (DST): UTC+2 (CEST)

Tabanović is a town in the municipality of Šabac, Serbia. As of the 2022 census the population is 1,152 residents.
