= Gložan =

Gložan Гложан (Serbian) Hložany (Slovak)
- Village (Selo)
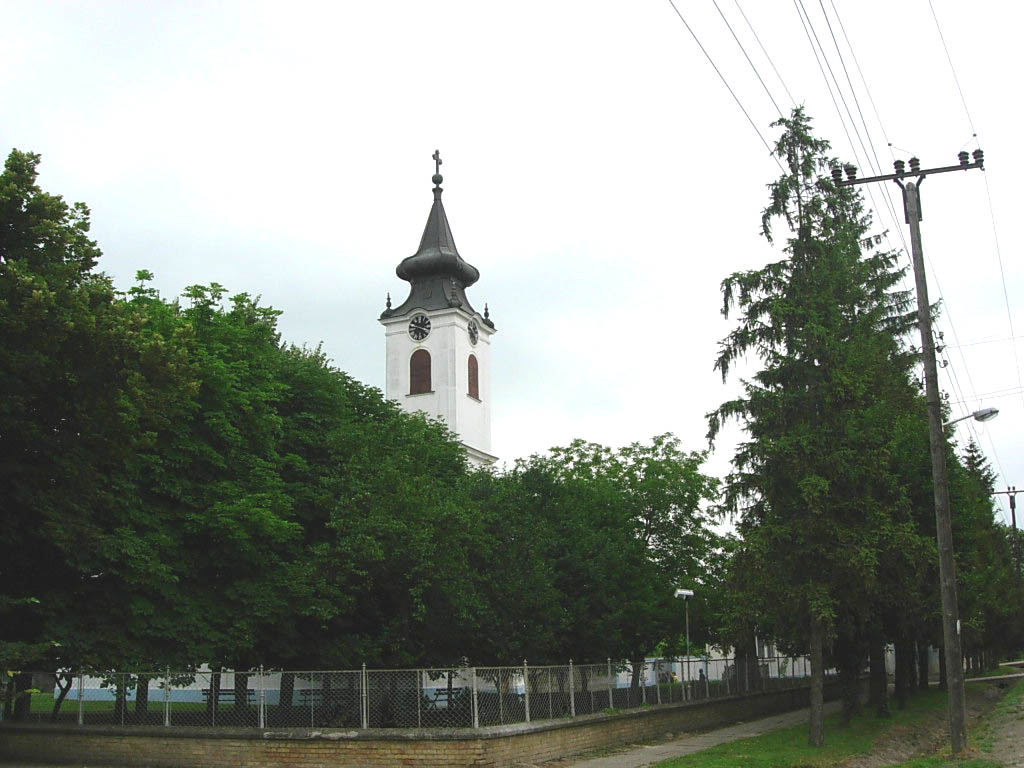
- The Evangelical (Slovak) Church

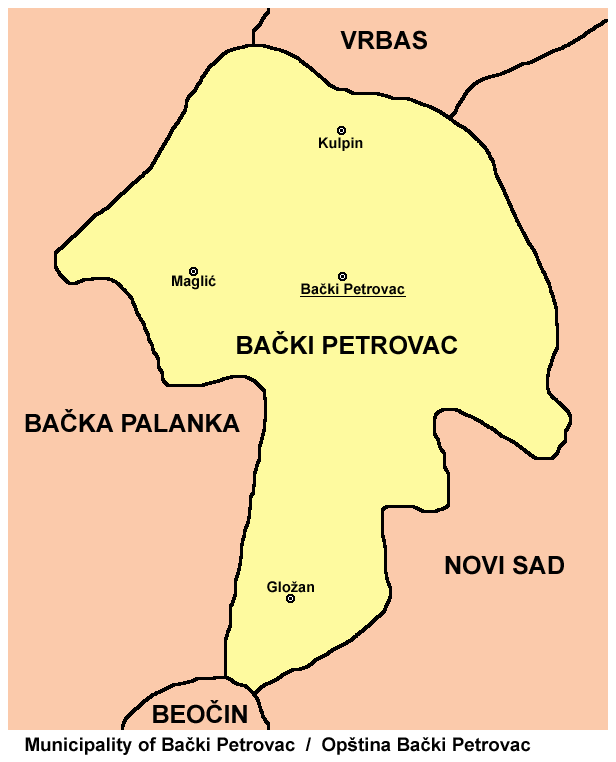
- Map of the Bački Petrovac municipality, showing the location of Gložan

- Location within Vojvodina Location within Serbia Location within Europe
- Coordinates: 45°17′N 19°34′E
- Country: Serbia
- Province: Vojvodina
- Region: Bačka (Podunavlje)
- District: South Bačka
- Municipality: Bački Petrovac

Area
  - Total: 11.78 sq mi (30.50 km^{2})
- Elevation: 272 ft (83 m)

Population (2022)
  - Total: 1,706
  - Density: 144.9/sq mi (55.93/km^{2})
- Time zone: UTC+1 (CET)
  - Summer (DST): UTC+2 (CEST)
- Postal code: 21412
- Area code: 381

Gložan (Serbian Cyrillic: Гложан) is a village located in the Bački Petrovac municipality, North Bačka District, Vojvodina, Serbia. The village has a population of 1,706 people (2022 census).

== Name ==
In Serbian the village is known as Gložan (Гложан); in Slovak as Hložany; and in Hungarian as Dunagálos.

== Demographics ==
=== Historical population ===
- 1961: 2,839
- 1971: 2,682
- 1981: 2,569
- 1991: 2,491
- 2002: 2,283
- 2011: 2,002
- 2022: 1,706

=== Ethnic groups ===
According to data from the 2022 census, ethnic groups in the village include:

- 1,362 (79.8%) Slovaks
- 162 (6.2%) Serbs
- Others/Undeclared/Unknown

== See also ==
- List of places in Serbia
- List of cities, towns and villages in Vojvodina
