= Aradac =

Aradac Арадац (Serbian)
- Village (Selo)
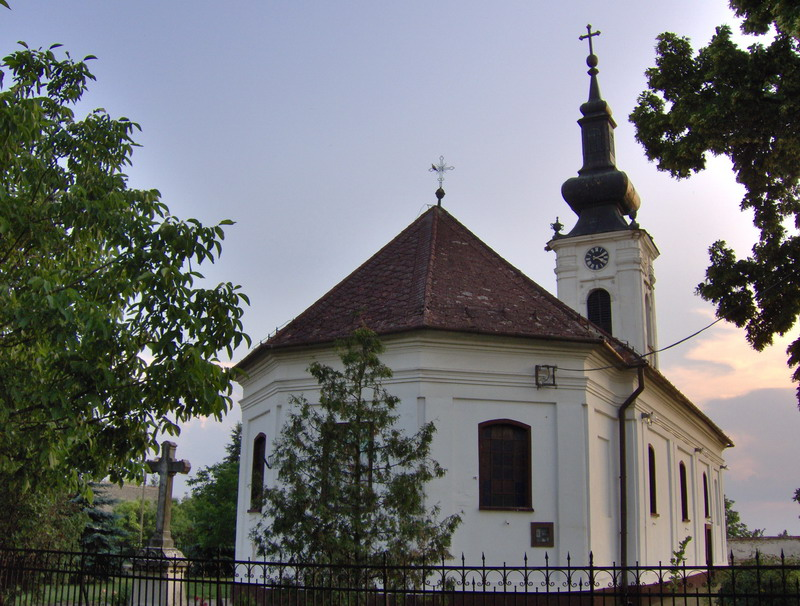
- Serbian Orthodox church in Aradac

- Location within Serbia Aradac (Serbia) Aradac (Europe)
- Coordinates: 45°22′35″N 20°18′03″E
- Country: Serbia
- Province: Vojvodina
- District: Central Banat
- Municipalities: Zrenjanin
- Elevation: 84 m (276 ft)

Population (2022)
  - Aradac: 3,358
- Time zone: UTC+1 (CET)
  - Summer (DST): UTC+2 (CEST)
- Postal code: 23207
- Area code: +381(0)23
- Car plates: ZR

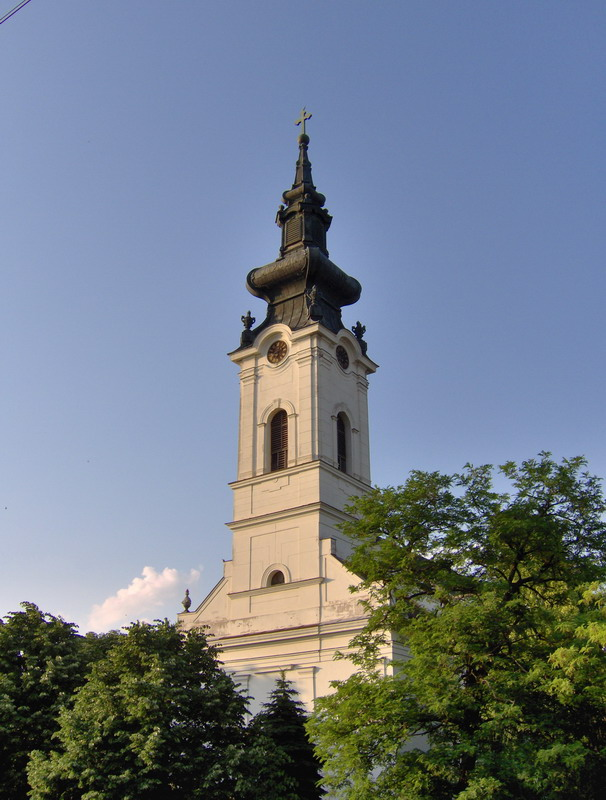
Slovak Evangelic church in Aradac

Aradac (Serbian Cyrillic: Арадац; Slovak: Aradáč; Hungarian: Aradi) is a village located in the Zrenjanin municipality, in the Central Banat District of Vojvodina, Serbia. The village is ethnically mixed and its population numbering 3,358 people (2022 census).

== Name ==
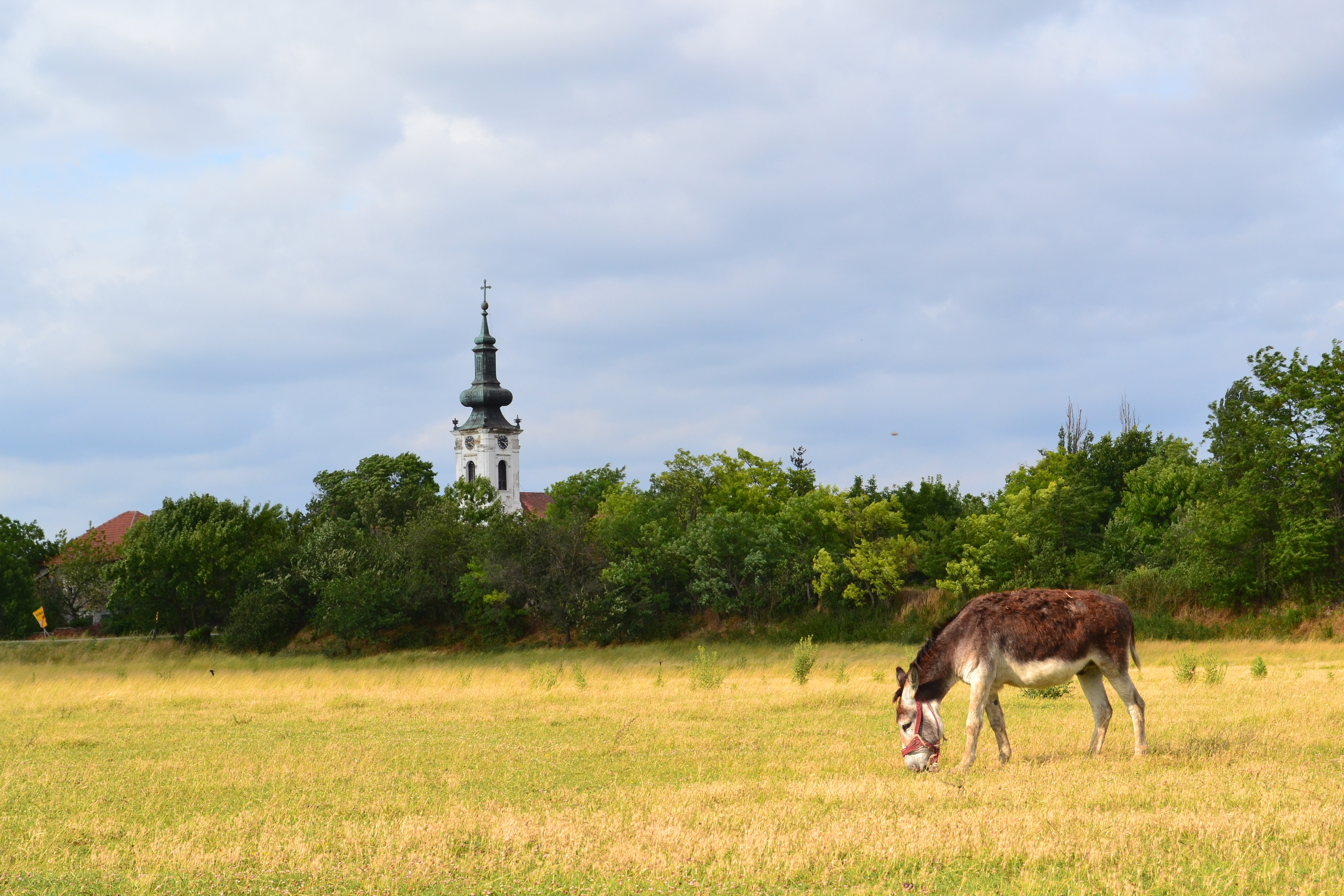
Landscape in Aradac

In Serbo-Croatian, the village is known as Aradac (Арадац), in Slovak as Aradáč, in Hungarian as Aradi, and in German as Aradatz.

== Ethnic groups ==
=== 1971 ===
According to the 1971 census, ethnic Slovaks comprised 58.56% of population of the village.

=== 2002 ===
In 2002, the population of the village included:

- 1,650 (47.67%) Serbs
- 1,376 (39.76%) Slovaks
- 96 (2.77%) Romani
- 94 (2.72%) Hungarians
- 49 (1.42%) Yugoslavs
- 17 (0.49%) Croats
- 179 (5.17%) others

== Historical population ==
- 1961: 4,001
- 1971: 3,824
- 1981: 3,825
- 1991: 3,573
- 2002: 3,461
- 2011: 3,335
- 2022: 3,358

== Sports ==
The model flying field located southwest of Aradac is scheduled to host the 2025 FAI World Championships for Space Models from 21-28 August, 2025.

== Notable people ==
- Milenko Bojanić, President of the People's Government of Serbia

== See also ==
- List of places in Serbia
- List of cities, towns and villages in Vojvodina
