= Boka =

Boka or Boʻka may refer to:

== Places ==
- Boka Kotorska, a geographical region in Montenegro
- Boka (Sečanj), village in Vojvodina, Serbia
- Boka (waterfall), a waterfall in western Slovenia
- Bauka, California, U.S., a former Maidu village
- Boka (restaurant), in Chicago, Illinois, U.S.
- Boʻka District, district of Tashkent Region, Uzbekistan
  - Boʻka, capital city of the district

== People ==
- Boka (footballer) (born 1988), Brazilian football forward
- Boka (singer) (1949–2020), Soviet singer
- Boka Kondra, Papua New Guinea politician
- Boka (surname)
- Bóka, a surname

== Other uses ==
- Boka language, Chadic language of Nigeria
