= Battle of Jarkovác =

First battle of the Hungarian War of Independence 1848

Coordinates: 45°16′11.6″N 20°45′36.2″E

- Part of the Hungarian Revolution of 1848
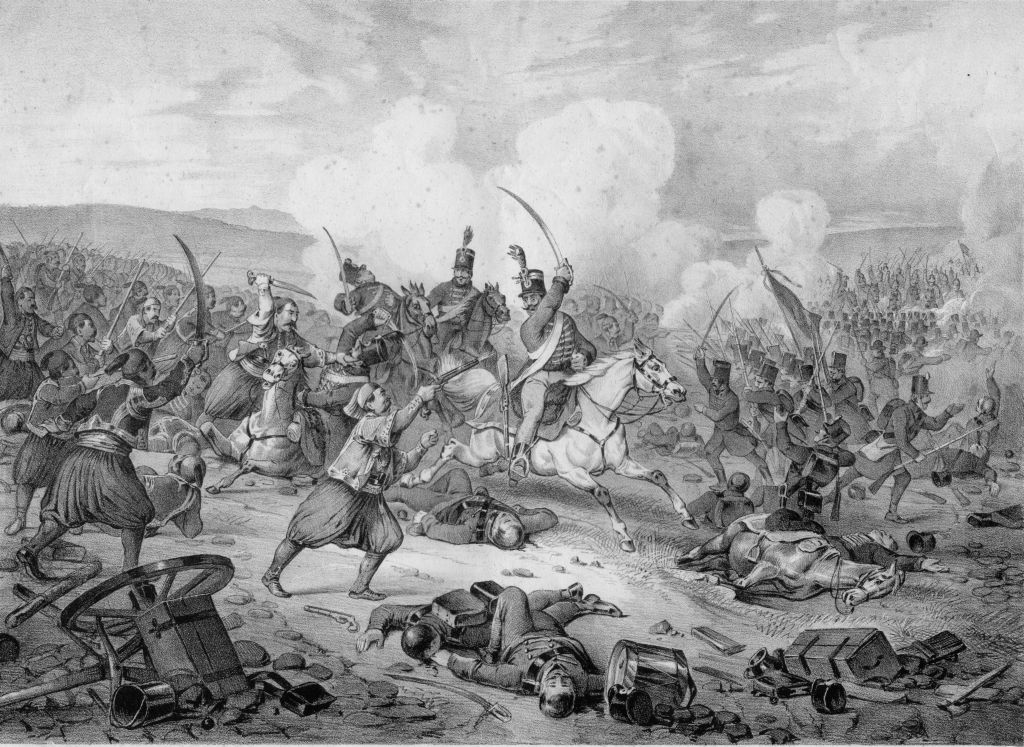
- Battle of Jarkovác
Date	15 December 1848
Location	Jarkovac, Torontál County, Bánság, Kingdom of Hungary (today Serbia)
Result	Hungarian victory

Belligerents
Hungarian Revolutionary Army	Austrian Empire: Serbian Vojvodina

Commanders and leaders
János Damjanich; Károly Leiningen-Westerburg	Stevan Šupljikac; Stevan Knićanin

Strength
~ 3,223 men 362 horses 14–16 cannons	~ 10,000 soldiers + unknown number of inhabitants of Jarkovác; 20 cannons

Casualties and losses
~300 men	~800–900

The Battle of Jarkovác (now Jarkovac, in the Sečanj municipality, Central Banat District, Vojvodina Serbia) was a battle in the Hungarian War of Independence of 1848–1849, fought in the night and early morning of 15 December 1848 between the Hungarian Army under the command of Colonel János Damjanich against the Serbian insurgents led by General Stevan Šupljikac and Colonel Stevan Knićanin. The Hungarian army led by General Ernő Kiss started an offensive against the Serbian insurgents in December 1848, achieving important successes (for example the capture of the Serb military camp from Alibunár) against them. When the tired soldiers of Damjanich's column arrived in Jarkovác and tried to rest in the night between 14 and 15 December, Šupljikac organized an ambush against them with the help of the Serbian inhabitants of the village. Damjanich sensed the trap and took precautions by refusing to quarter his soldiers in the houses of the inhabitants and installing the troops on the streets. Thanks to this, although with heavy losses, the combined night attack of the Serbian army and the inhabitants of Jarkovác was repulsed, and the attackers chased away. Because the commander of the Hungarian main forces, Ernő Kiss did not notice that the Serbs evacuated the bridgehead of Tomasevác, Šupljikac's and Knićanin's troops managed to escape with heavy losses.

== Background ==
After the victory at Battle of Alibunár-Károlyfalva, at 9 am on 13 December, the united Hungarian army led by General Ernő Kiss continued its march towards Tomasevác. The march led through Szeleus to Illáncsa. From one of the houses in the village, a Serb opened fire on the Hungarian Hussars. As a result of this, on the orders of Colonel János Damjanich, the Honvéds burned and devastated the settlement, which was inhabited by Serbs but was almost empty this time. Only the house of a seventy-year-old man was spared.

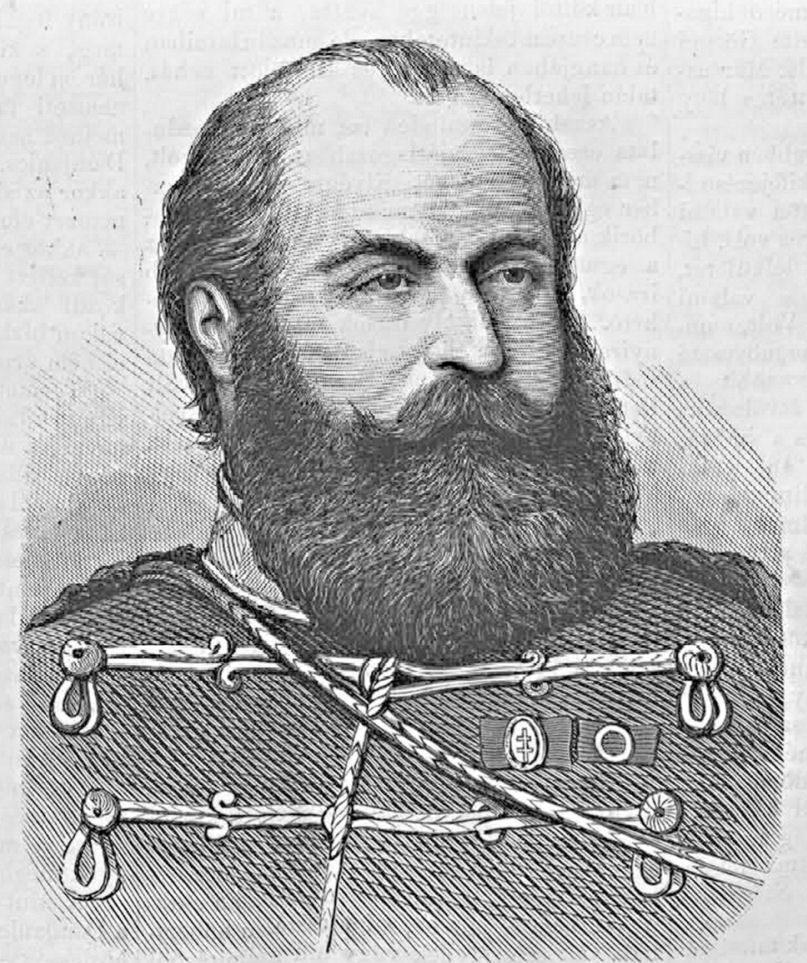
János Damjanich

A soldier of the 10th Battalion shot dead the priest of the village. Unfortunately, during the Hungarian-Serbian conflict from 1848 to 1849, both sides committed atrocities against each other's civilians. Hungarian soldiers often committed killings, arson, or summary executions in retaliation for earlier Serbian massacres of Hungarian civilians, or in response to attacks like the above by Serbian civilians.

There was a great distrust among the Hungarian troops towards the Serbian population. Therefore, when the army resumed its march to Dobrica on the evening of the 13th, it set up camp outside the village as a precautionary measure. There was exhaustion among the troops; the 9th Battalion was already grumbling about not having bread, but the others were also angry.

According to the operational plan of the Hungarian headquarters at Nagybecskerek, on 13 December, Ernő Kiss's troops, sent to Banatski Despotovac|Ernesztháza and Zsigmondfalva, advanced to the bridgehead of Tomasevác within a distance of a cannon shot and were to wait for Damjanich's attack. These troops surrounded the bridgehead in a large semicircle on the evening of the 13th, and in Bótos was the headquarters.

According to the Hungarian plan, the attack was to take place on the 14th. The distance between Dobrica and Tomasevác is about 20 kilometers, but with the exhaustion of the troops Damjanich wanted to be sure that Kiss's troops were already in front of Tomasevác. He led his troops from Dobrica to Jarkovác, near the Berzava Canal, and had them stationed there. Then he rode to Bótos on the canal's right bank to coordinate the attack's details with Kiss.

== Prelude ==
Jarkovác is located on the left bank of the Berzava canal, and a wooden bridge led from the village to the other bank. East of Jarkovác was a small forest.

Jarkovác and the surrounding villages and territories at the middle of the 19th century

The population greeted the soldiers warmly, offering them plenty of food and wine at lunch and supper. Captain Károly Leiningen-Westerburg was already thinking how unfair they were in their distrust of the Serbs. It was striking that the population was particularly generous with wine. The Hungarian officers became suspicious of the unusual hospitality of the Serbian inhabitants. For this reason, when Damjanich returned from Bótos, he ordered the companies to camp outdoors, in front of their captain's quarters, instead of in the houses of the Jarkovácians.

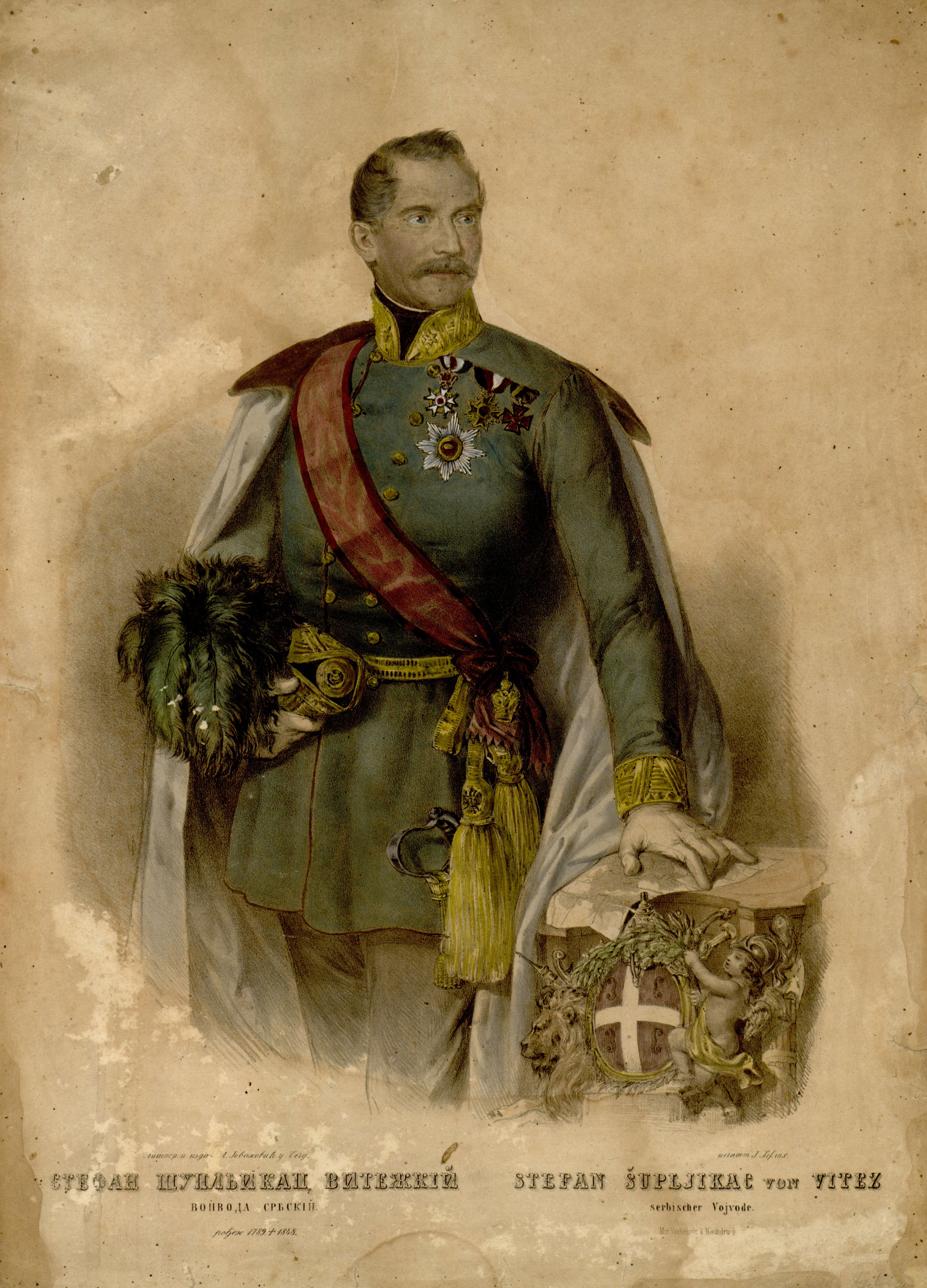
Stefan Supljikac

The outposts were set up by the 9th (Red-hatted) Honvéd Battalion. The guns and luggage carriages were positioned in the main square near the church. The tired troops rested after the long march. At Margitica, the canal crossing there was held by a detachment, but the bridge behind Jarkovác was left unguarded by the Hungarians. Damjanich was unaware that the Serbs had gathered at Újfalu and were threatening his army. All his concerns were directed only toward Tomasevác.

Stevan Šupljikac, the commander-in-chief of the Serbian troops, realized after the defeats at Károlyfalva and Alibunár that the Hungarians' aim was to attack the Tomasevác camp from two directions. He, therefore, ordered Stevan Knićanin to evacuate Tomasevác and march with his troops to Szamos. Šupljikac himself gathered the troops expelled from Károlyfalva and Alibunár, as well as part of the Pancsova garrison, at Újfalu. Knićanin arrived on 14 December between 7–8 pm, Šupljikac between 10 and 12 pm. Knićanin left 100 men and 2 guns at the bridgehead in Tomasevac to watch the Hungarian troops. The combined force numbered about 10,000 men and 20 guns; Damjanich had 19 infantry companies (i.e. three strong battalions), 4 cavalry companies, including the ones captured at Alibunár and Károlyfalva, at most 14–16 guns.

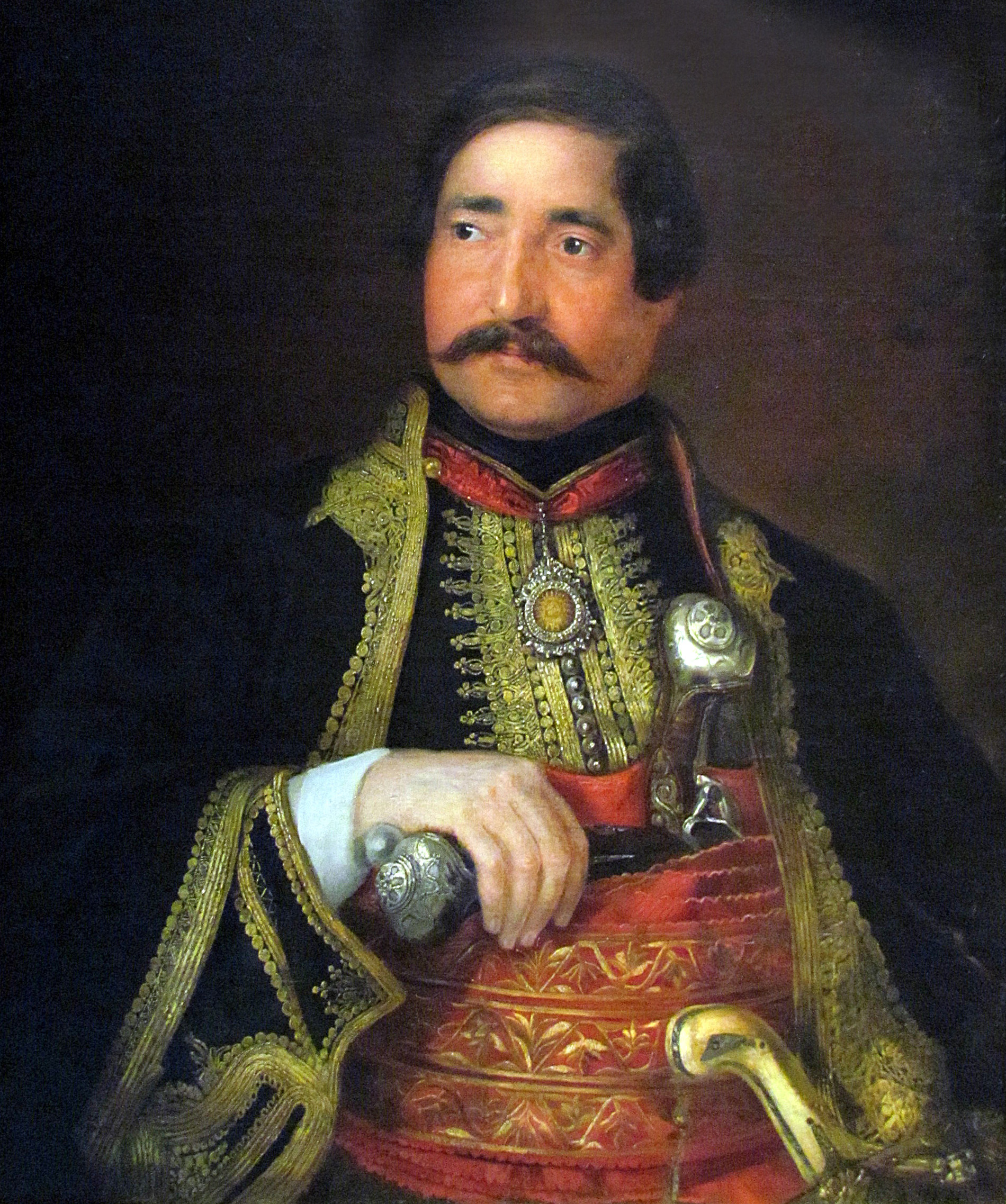
A portrait of Knićanin by Katarina Ivanović

Šupljikac learned from the inhabitants of Jarkovác that the Hungarians were camped there and that communication with General Kiss's army had been re-established via Neuzina. Šupljikac issued the following order for the raid to be carried out on Szamos: Captain Petar Joannović with 2 companies of border guards from Pétervárad and 1/2 company of Jarkovác militias (under National Guard Lieutenant Pavle Putnik) will advance to the woods between Jarkovác and Margitica and occupy them with one company, while the rest of the force will turn towards Jarkovác and occupy the edge of the village along the canal without being noticed. Lieutenant Putnik with a troop of shooters will try to advance unnoticed further along the same route and take up a position on the wooden bridge of the Berzava Canal.

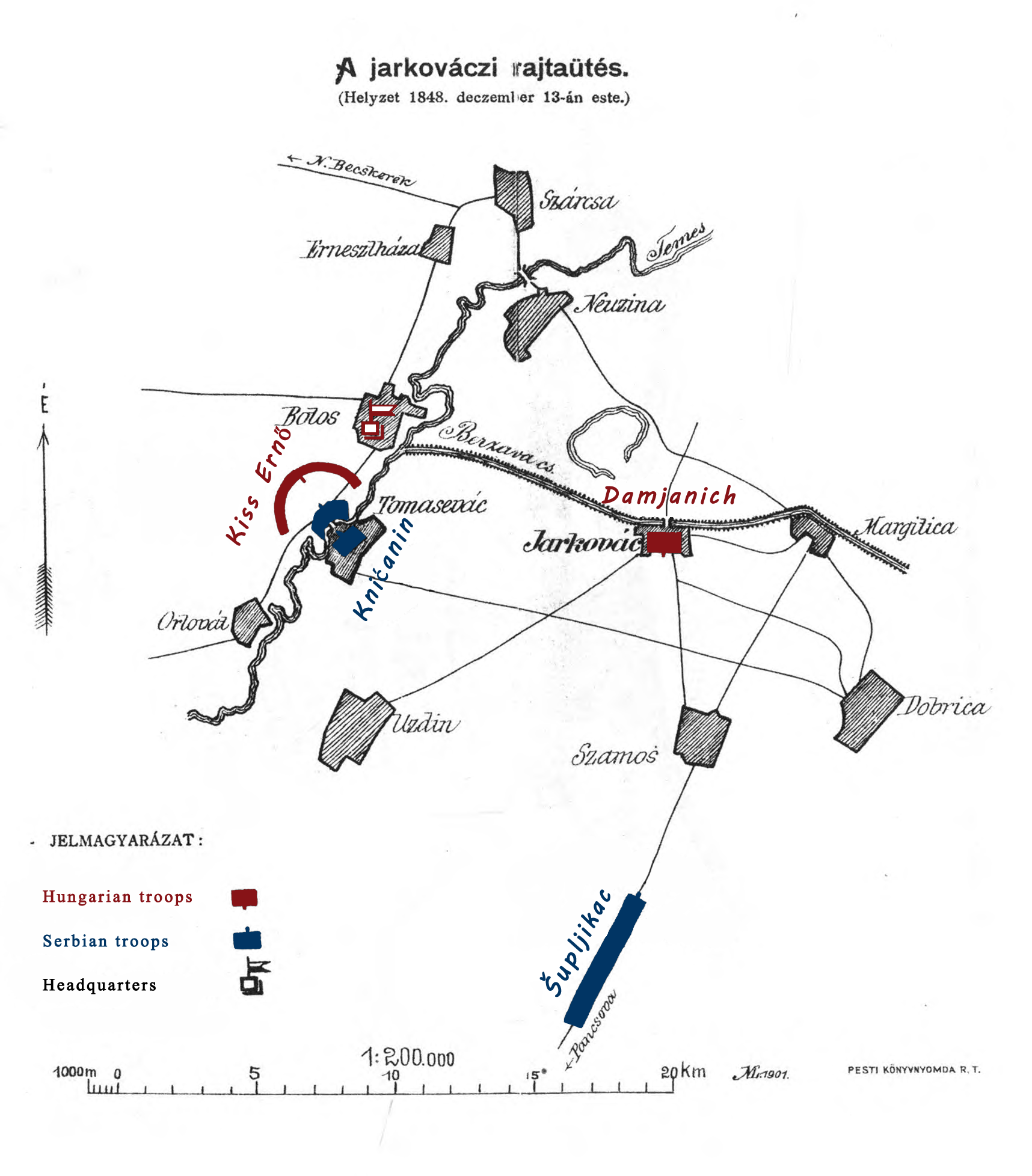
The situation a day before the Battle of Jarkovác (15 December 1848)

Lieutenant Lazić with 2 companies of German-Banatian border guards, will occupy the northern edge of the village up to the bridge, bypassing the enemy's right flank, as will the other squad, in order that these two groups prevent the Hungarians from breaking out and escaping across the canal, and saving the cannons over the bridge. It is clear from this that the inhabitants even informed Šupljikac that the bridge behind Jarkovác was not guarded by the Hungarians. In the front line against the southern edge of the village, were the 3rd and 4th battalions of the German-Banatian border guard regiment, headed by the Servian (volunteers coming from the Principality of Serbia) skirmishers. They formed the 1st line of battle under the command of Knićanin. The 2nd battle line was formed by the Illyrian-Banatian Battalion, while the 3 Pétervárad Border Guard Battalion under the command of Mihajlo Joannović was the reserve. The latter stayed on the hill behind the road to Tomasevác, probably in order to cover his retreat in case the ambush failed. Šupljikac's plan was to destroy Damjanich's column in a night raid, and he could count on the cooperation of the local population.

In the meantime, the inhabitants of Jarkovác did everything to prepare the perfect ambush for the Hungarians. Besides trying to get them drunk, they tried, as they could, to make the Hungarian cannons and the soldiers' fusils unusable, to cut the Hussars horses' halters, to take down the saddles. Some Serbs climbed on the church's tower, while others climbed in the attics of the houses, and other elevated places, taking firing position there. Preparing for the battle, in order to know them in safety, the Serbs from Jarkovác sent their women away.

=== Opposing forces ===
Hungarian army

Unit	Infantry companies	Cavalry companies	Men	Horses	Cannons
3rd (White Feathered) Honvéd Battalion	3	–	418	–	–
9th (Red Hatted) Honvéd Battalion	4	–	748	–	–
10th Honvéd Battalion	?	–	931	–	–
3rd Battalion of the 60th (Wasa) Infantry Regiment	?	–	602	–	–
6th Hussar Regiment	–	2	202	202	–
13th Hussar Regiment	–	1	162	160	–
Artillery	–	–	~ 160	~ 160	14–16
Total	7 + ?	3	~ 3,223	~ 522	14–16

Serbian army

Unit	Battalions	Men	Cannons
3rd battalion of the 12th (German-Banatian) Border Guard Regiment	1	1,500	–
4th battalion of the 12th (German-Banatian) Border Guard Regiment	1	1,500	–
18th (Illyrian-Serb-Banatian) Border Guard Regiment	2	2,200	–
9th (Pétervárad) Border Guard Regiment	3	2,000	–
Servians (volunteers from the Ottoman-Serbian Principality)	–	1,500	–
Artillery	–	?	20
Total	7	8,700 + ?	20

Besides the regular troops, an undefined number of armed inhabitants of Jarkovác joined the battle on the Serbian side, and together with these, there were around 10,000 men bearing arms fighting on Serbian soldiers.

== Battle ==
The attack took place between 3 and 3.30 am. The Serbs led by Knićanin attacked the Hungarian outposts and drove them into the village. By the time the surprised Hungarian troops wakened, there was great confusion. As the Serb troops entered the village, the villagers also took up arms and shot at the gathering Hungarian troops from attics, windows, and other high places. ...Bullets were whistling from the direction of the church, the attics of houses, from everywhere and in all directions – wrote later a soldier of the 9th (Red-hatted) Battalion of the Hungarian Army.

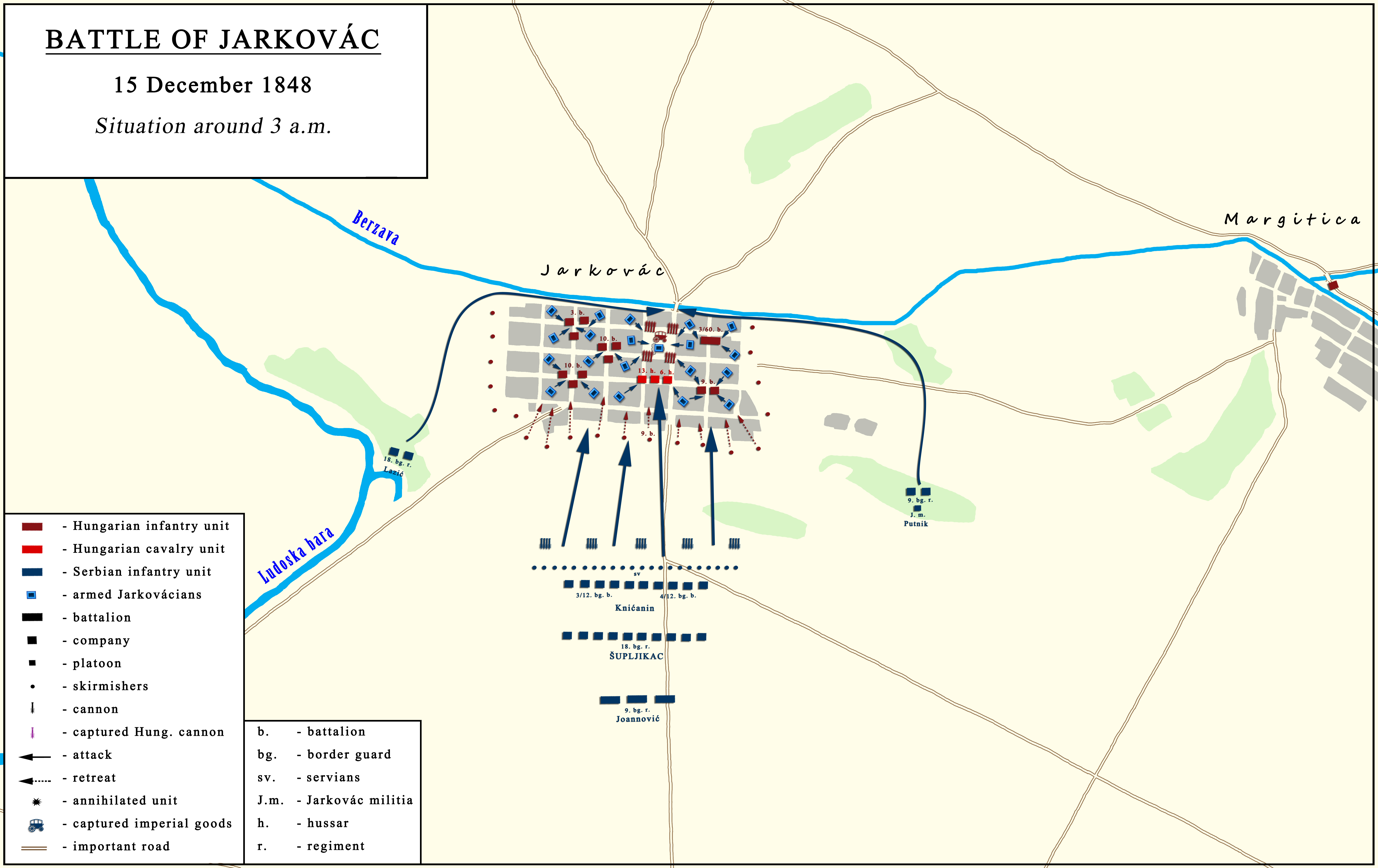
Battle of Jarkovác 15 December 1848. Situation around 3 a.m., the start of the battle

By the time of the attack, Damjanich, Major Pál Kiss and Leiningen were sleeping in a house. After the attack, they all rushed to their troops. Fortunately, the Hungarian troops, which as shown before, thanks to the precaution of Damjanich, were camped in the open street, could now be assembled relatively quickly.

In the initial phase of the ambush, when Knićanin entered the village with the first line of battle, his Servians took two 6-pounder cannons from the Hungarians and dragged them off triumphantly. For about half an hour a terrible hand-to-hand struggle developed between Serbs and Hungarians. There were Hungarian groups of soldiers who were cut from the rest of their comrades, like the 70 soldiers from the 3rd (White Feathered) Battalion, led by Lieutenant Szikszai, who defended themselves in a ditch against hugely outnumbering Serb troops, supported also by cannons, breaking miraculously out of the encirclement, and retreating through the Berzava canal north to the village. A group of Hungarians cut through the enemy lines, that the trumpeter of the Hannover-Hussars, József Reinhart riding forward, trumpeting the attack signal, then a squadron of hussars galloped forward with a great roar but stopped immediately. This was repeated several times. The feigned Hussar attacks frightened the Serbs, who started fleeing every time when they heard that, opening the way for the Hungarian troops' escape.

Captain Leiningen, who was sleeping dressed, immediately rushed outside where 3 of his companies were lining up. The bullets whistling from all sides of the houses were particularly disturbing to the cavalry, who could find no cover anywhere. 20 hussar horses went wild and galloped into the Serbs' 2nd line of battle. Leiningen assembled the three companies of the 10th Battalion camped in front of the house where he slept and sent them out, company by company, to clear the surrounding streets. He himself, at the head of one company, encountered a squad coming from the front, and shouted Stop, who are you?, these replied: Hungarians, but then immediately opened fire on Leiningen's company. This was another trick that the Serbs used: many Hungarian accounts reported that in the darkness, the Serbs replied in Hungarian to the Hungarians, in order to lure them closer, and then shoot them. But the Hungarian company returned fire and drove the enemy back with a bayonet charge.

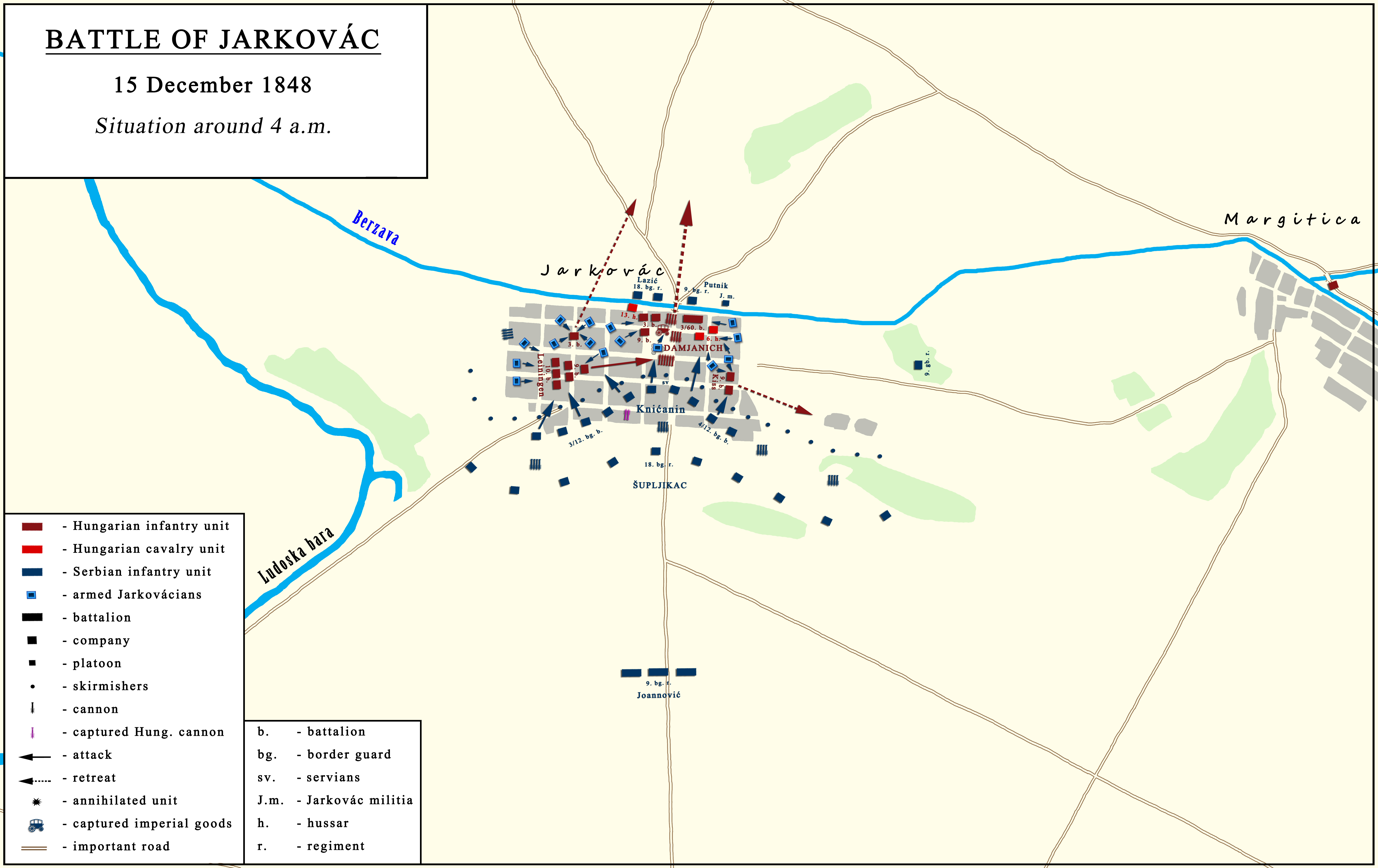
Battle of Jarkovác 15 December 1848. Situation around 4 a.m

Then, Leiningen rushed to the 10th Honvéd Battalion, (Note: Bánlaky writes about the 9th and the 3/60 (Wasa) Battalion, but these were, during the battle, under the command of Pál Kiss and Aschermann, pushed out of Jarkovác, as Bánlaky himself writes, at the beginning of the battle, respectively Damjanich, retreating north from the village, therefore it is more probable that it is the 10th Battalion, of which Leiningen indeed commanded, as shown above. Maybe a smaller unit (perhaps a company) of the 9th Battalion could join the 10th Battalion led by Leiningen.) billeted in the southern part of the village, while Damjanich tried to line up the troops in the northern edge of the village.

Damjanich, when he was awakened by the shootings, had no time to fully dress up, just put on his boots and coat, took his swords, and rushed out of the house in his pants. His first concern was to rescue the artillery and with it the wagons of ammunition and luggage in the village's main square. He found a group of soldiers from the 9th (Red Hatted) Battalion, with whom he rushed to the main square, where he found a group of Serbs who were trying to dismantle the cannons and steal the ammunition and the luggage. Damjanich, with his soldiers, chased the Serbs away. After this, he immediately sent the cannons and wagons to the bridge of the Berzava Canal, but the horses, frightened by the enemy firing in the darkness, turned over several wagons, adding to the confusion and disorder. In order to get the cannons and wagons to safety, Damjanich had to besiege the houses from which the Serbs were shooting at his soldiers and horses. Arriving at the canal, the frightened horses turned 7 cannons and their accompanying ammunition wagons into the Berzava, which Captain Freudenreich could only get out again with great difficulty. Damjanich, with the 3rd Battalion of the 60th Infantry Regiment, some companies of the 3rd (White Feathered) Battalion, and 4 guns, retreated to the Berzava bridge and crossed it to rally his troops. (Note: In the historical works about the battle, there is a confusion about with which battalion went Damjanich across the Berzava canal out of Jarkovác, then returned to push out the Serbs. Some say that with the 9th (Red Hatted) battalion. But the monographs about the 3rd (White Feathered) and the 9th (Red Hatted) battalions point that Damjanich actually commanded the 3rd Battalion to the north, across the Berzava and back to Jarkovác, while Leiningen rallied the 9th Battalion, and fought with, pushing the Serbs to the southern and eastern edge of the village.)

Damjanich in the fields north of the Berzava canal rallied his troops, and from a trench, repulsed the renewed attacks of the Serbs until the start of the dawn. At about 4 o'clock in the morning, Damjanich sent a letter with a hussar to General Ernő Kiss Damjanich, informing him that he had been forced to retreat from the village and leave some of his guns behind in the enemy's hands. But, he continued, at sunrise he wants to push into the village again and make up for everything. However, Damjanich, did not wait for the sun to rise; but as soon as his troops were reorganized, he attempted to cross the bridge and return to the village, but the bridge was by then occupied by the Serbs, who poured on the Hungarians such heavy fire from the surrounding entrenchments that even the soldiers of the 9th Battalion, renown of their courage, could not break through. Damjanich, therefore, had his troops marched across the Berzava through the waters of the canal and thus began the clearing of the village. During this fight, Corporal István Gorove of the 3rd Battalion, entered a duel with one of the chiefs of the Serbs and killed him.

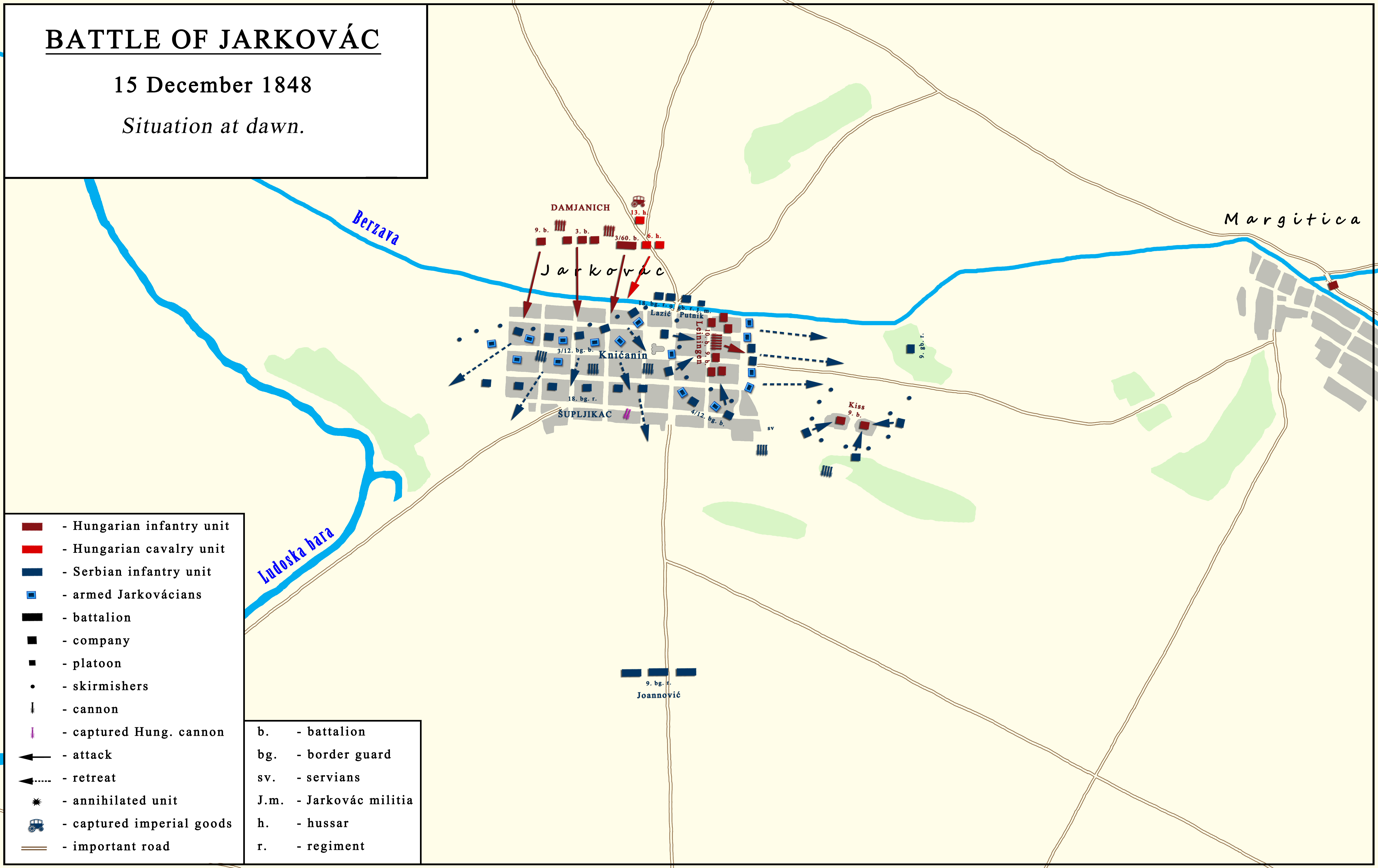
Battle of Jarkovác 15 December 1848. Situation at dawn

Damjanich, after storming the Serbs' first line of battle, drove them out of the village. The Serbs' 2nd line of battle, with the exception of Lieutenant Bessarabić's battalion, which remained stationary, also started running. General Šupljikac rushed to restore order, however, due to the delayed advance of the reserve, Knićanin was forced to retreat with part of his troops, while the other part dragged with great effort the two guns taken from the Hungarians at the beginning of the battle. Afterward, these two guns fell again into the hands of the Hungarians.

The Honvéds who invaded the village besieged the houses one after another, and after seeing that a group of Serbs, climbed into the church tower, and fired on the Hungarians, they tried to climb after them, but seeing that the stairs of the tower were destroyed in order to prevent them to get there, they simply set fire to the church from the inside, burning the Serbs from the tower.

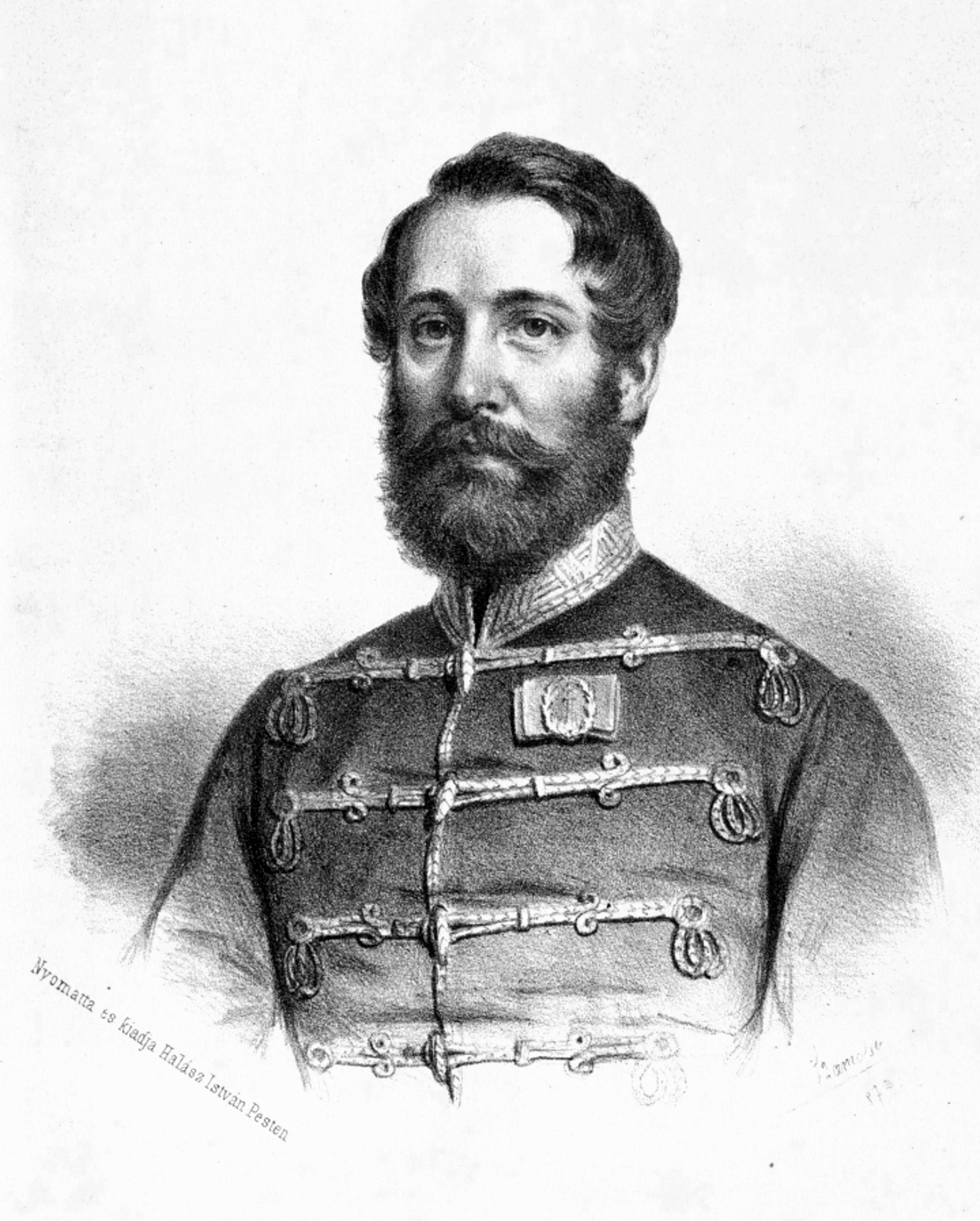
Leiningen-Westerburg Károly

Meanwhile, Captain Leiningen received a report that, despite Damjanich's action in the main square of the village to save the cannons and the ammunition wagons, six guns remained still in the square and could not get across the bridge. He therefore entrusted the company to one of his officers, and himself hurried to the guns. Everything in the square was in a state of confusion. The enemy has already occupied the road leading to the bridge from the right and left, in order to cut off the retreat of the Hungarian troops if they fail to take the houses occupied by the enemy. Therefore, Major Károly Földváry, commander of the 3rd Battalion, and one of the greatest heroes of the Hungarian revolution, Leiningen, Captain Ede Czillich from the 60th Infantry Regiment and Captain Ferenc Aschermann gathered the troops and tried to break their way towards the bridge. However, the Honvéds received such crossfire from the houses that they refused to advance. Földváry turned to Leiningen, saying: Come on brother, let's go ahead, maybe the cowardly dogs will follow us! They then tried to clear the houses one by one, but on entering the first house an officer and a private fell, and the Honvéds retreated again.

Meanwhile, fighting could also be heard to the west of the village, and the noise was getting farther away, as a sign that the troops of Damjanich were pushing the Serbs. Leiningen decided to try to get out of the village eastwards rather than northwards. They loaded the cannons with grapeshot, fired with them down the street leading to the village Dobrica, and then lined up the infantry on both sides of the cannons to prevent the horses and carriages from being hit by bullets, and so started to advance towards the exit of the village. They reached the village border, but here the Serbs dug themselves into the trenches and could not be driven out. Then Leiningen had a lucky idea, with which he resolved this problem. With what little Hungarian he knew, he shouted: Look, how the Serbs are running! The Serbs had no intention of running, but the Honvéds believed what their captain said, and with another charge, they forced the enemy to run, and flee towards Dobrica. When the Hungarians reached about 500 paces away from the village, the officers tried to reorganize the intermingled detachments. In the darkness, Leiningen now tried to connect with Major Kiss's 9th Battalion on the right. He only heard that the battle on the right flank was moving further and further away from the village.

As dawn broke a little, Leiningen found himself with his troops not on the extreme left flank, but on the right part of this flank, towards the vineyards. The Jarkovác vineyard was located about 800 – 1000 paces ahead. This was held by the enemy. Leiningen, who reached the extreme left flank of the battlefield, sent 2 companies there; and they soon drove the enemy out of the vineyard. The line of battle of the left flank was stretched out into the distance, while the Serbs were in rapid retreat. But there was no cavalry at hand to pursue the runners. Therefore, he sent one company after the runners, and with the others, he turned back towards the village and pushed in to intercept the fleeing Serbs, who were trying to retreat from Jarkovác.

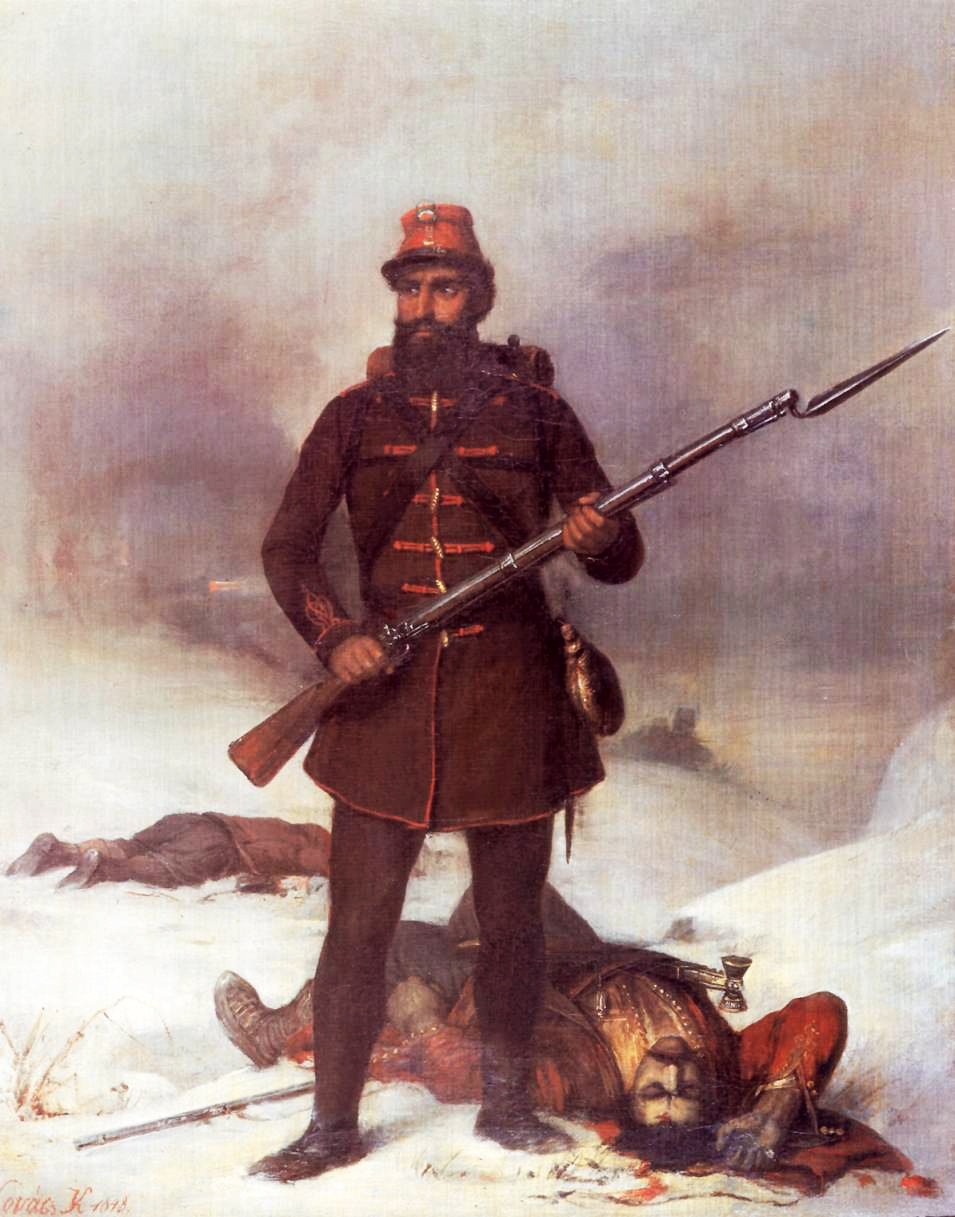
Soldier of the 9th (Red Hatted) Battalion in 1848 by Mihály Kovács

There was heavy gunfire on the north side of the village. The enemy troops around the bridge were surrounded by the Hungarian troops there. The Serbs now fled in large numbers from the village towards Szamos; for the Hungarian troops who had retreated to the other side of the Berzava, hearing that the tide of the battle was getting far, also returned and attacked the enemy units, which remained in the village.

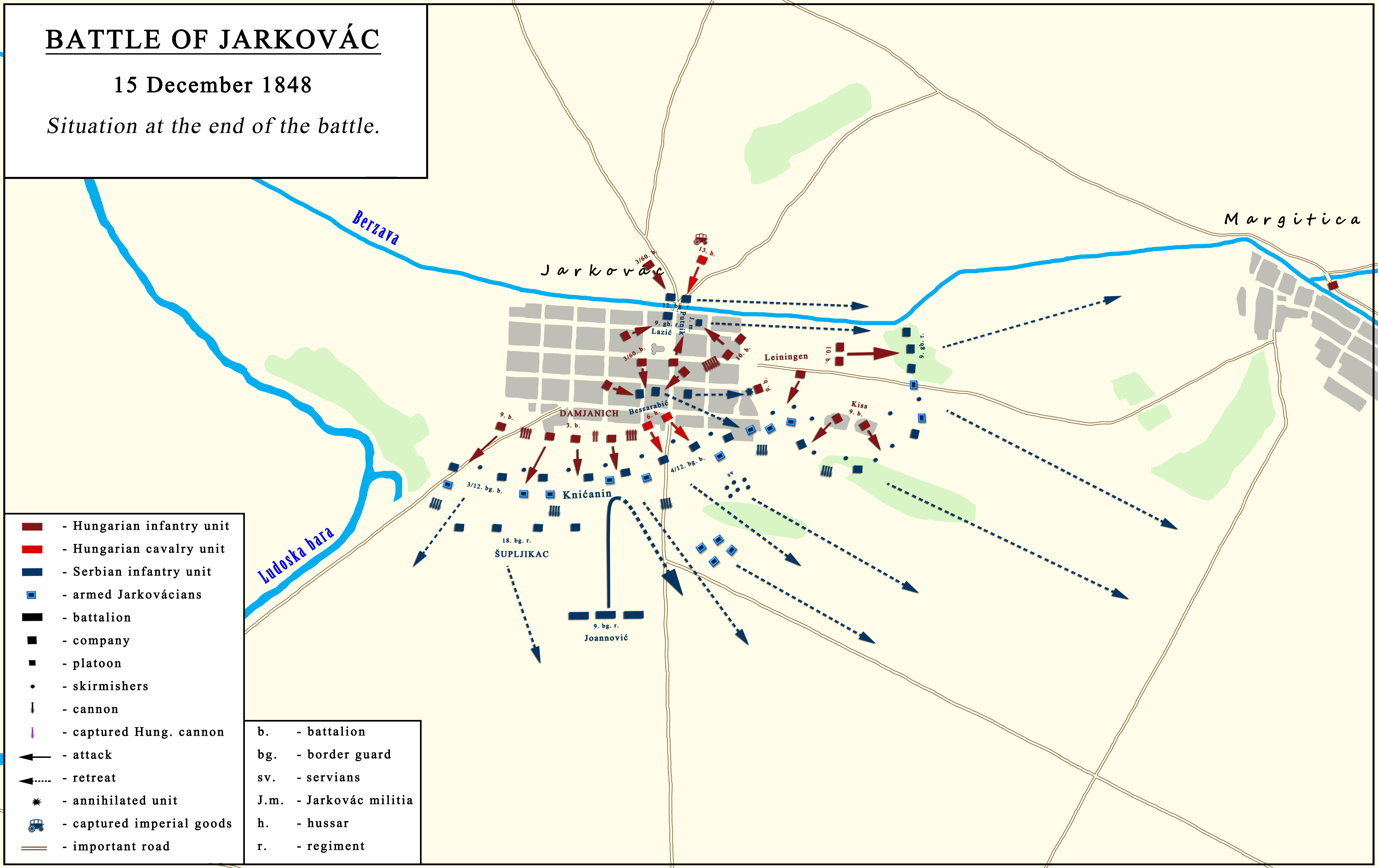
Battle of Jarkovác 15 December 1848. Situation at the end of the battle

A second group of about 60 men broke out of the village and was heading toward the Hungarian left flank. These were border guards from Pétervárad and German-Banat Border Guards led by Lieutenant Putnik, who have been driven from the region of the Berzava bridge. They were attacked by the Honvéds and the Wasa infantry. Ten of them were shot, the others ran so fast that the Hungarians could not catch up with them. On the Hungarian left flank, another fleeing company of border guards was decimated by the 9th (Red Hatted) honvéds.

After dawn, Damjanich's troops were on the south side of the village, facing the Serbs, forming a battle order. Šupljikac pulled the reserve forward to relieve the retreating troops.

Meanwhile, there was worrying news on the Hungarian left wing, that Damjanich had been killed in action, and that Major Kiss, commander of the 9th Honvéd Battalion had fallen. When they met again, the joy of the troops who had been separated by a night full of fighting, was indescribable. Leiningen writes in his diary that Damjanich rushed to him with open arms and exclaimed: My dear Leiningen, my God, how much I cried for you!

On the road to Dobrica, the Hungarian troops finally joined with the soldiers from the 9th Battalion of Pál Kiss and Aschermann, which successfully held their ground for 5 hours in the farms around the village against the overwhelming enemy fighting against them. The appearance of Damjanic's men gave Pál Kiss and Aschermann new strength and enthusiasm, and the thus reunited troops threw themselves irresistibly on the enemy, who, despite a strong counterattack by Knićanin, were soon forced to retreat towards Dobrica and then Pancsova, pursued vigorously by the Hussars.

== Aftermath ==
The Serbs retreated through Szamos to Lajosfalva, and on the way Captain Petar Joannović joined the corps from Margitica with the company that dug in at the small forest between Jarkovác and Margitica. During the battle, no news was heard of Lieutenant Lazić, who bypassed the village from the west. When the corps was resting in Lajosfalva, he arrived there with his two companies. Then the Serbian corps retreated through Dobrica to Pancsova.

Šupljikac's retreating army was later pursued by 2 companies of Würtenberg and Hannover Hussars. When the Serbs had completely retreated, Damjanich gathered his army, exhausted from the night battle, and rested until noon. The Hungarians burnt Jarkovác, as a retaliation for the against them attack by its inhabitants.

The accounts about the losses give very different numbers. According to historian Ödön Olchváry, the Serb army had 350 dead in this battle, while the inhabitants of Jarkovác 150, and at least as many were wounded. Their total losses were therefore estimated at 1000. The Hungarians had 30 dead out of 150 casualties. According to historian József Bánlaky, the Serbs lost between 800 and 900 men, while the Hungarians only the number of killed soldiers reached 300, which means that the total number of casualties was much higher. Of the Hungarian and Serbian officers who participated in the battle, or were part of the staff, Leiningen wrote that the Hungarians lost 30 dead and 120 wounded, N. Jászay said that they lost 20 dead and 45 wounded, and György Klapka said that they lost 300 dead. According to Stefanović-Vilovski, the Serbs lost 200 men; according to Leiningen, 460 dead and 350 wounded; according to N. Jászay, 1,500 soldiers.

It is an interesting detail that, Stevan Supljikac died from a heart attack on the day of the battle, on 15 December, at Pancsova. This makes it very likely that Supljikac suffered a heart attack due to the shock of losing the battle.

The victory could have been even greater if Ernő Kiss's troops in front of Tomasevác had noticed in time that Knićanin's troops had left the entrenchments from there. However, the Serbs reached Pancsova with heavy losses. Damjanich marched his battered troops through Neuzina to Szárcsa. Here he made contact with Kiss's troops. At dawn, when the hussar from Damjanich reached General Kiss and informed him of the situation, General Kiss ordered part of the troops under Lieutenant-Colonel Appel to occupy the bridgehead at Tomasevac and gave orders that no shots were to be fired.

At dawn, they entered the bridgehead but found it abandoned and the bridge on the Temes river was dismantled. It is noteworthy that although the Hungarian troops were positioned in a semicircle around the bridgehead, they only learned of Knićanin's retreat and the dismantling of the bridge on the Temes when they entered the bridgehead, which denotes deficiencies in their reconnaissance. If they had learned about this earlier, they could completely crush the Serbian army.

Only then was the army marched to the aid of Damjanich through Ernesztháza. But when they were on the way, came the news that the Serbs had been repulsed with heavy losses.

And that was the end of the campaign. Kiss did not continue the attack on Pancsova, but quartered his troops and was content to take the three camps.

Šupljikac himself saw his situation as desperate: in Bánság (Banat) he had reduced his troops to 3,900, because the others, mainly the German, Romanian, and Slovak border guards, had gone home. I must point out that these troops are neither adequately trained nor disciplined, and compared with the far more numerous enemy, consisting of old regiments and trained honvéds, which is supplied with plenty of good artillery and cavalry, our troops are of much inferior quality, and cannot be counted on at all against overwhelming odds, he wrote to the high commander of the Austrian imperial troops in Hungary, Alfred I, Prince of Windisch-Grätz.

One of the reasons for stopping the campaign was that the actions of the Austrian garrison of Temesvár were causing increasing problems for the Hungarian Banat command center. Had Ernő Kiss been a little more daring as a general than he was, he might have had a serious chance of finally putting down the Serbian uprising. However, because of this, the victory at Jarkovác remained unexploited.

== Sources ==
- Bánlaky, József (2001). A magyar nemzet hadtörténelme ("The Military History of the Hungarian Nation) (in Hungarian). Budapest: Arcanum Adatbázis.
- Bóna, Gábor (1987). Tábornokok és törzstisztek a szabadságharcban 1848–49 ("Generals and Staff Officers in the War of Freedom 1848–1849") (in Hungarian). Budapest: Zrínyi Katonai Kiadó. p. 430. ISBN 963-326-343-3.
- Borovszky Samu. Torontál vármegye Magyarország vármegyéi és városai. Országos Monográfia Társaság (1912) Budapest
- Hegyesi, Márton (1898). Az 1848-49-iki harmadik honvédzászlóalj története (PDF) (in Hungarian). Budapest: Franklin-Társulat.
- Hermann, Róbert (2001), 1848–1849 a szabadságharc hadtörténete ("Military History of 1848–1849") (in Hungarian), Budapest: Korona, ISBN 963-9376-21-3
- Hermann, Róbert (2004). Az 1848–1849-es szabadságharc nagy csatái ("Great battles of the Hungarian Revolution of 1848-1849") (in Hungarian). Budapest: Zrínyi. p. 408. ISBN 963-327-367-6.
- Hoffmann, Arnold (1906). Az 1848-49-iki vörös-sapkás 9-ik honvédzászlóalj története (PDF) (in Hungarian). Kassa: Vitéz A. Ut. Könyv- és Múnyomdája.
- Rajačić, Josif. "РАЈАЧИЋ, Јосиф - Обавештење патријарха Јосифа Рајачића о томе да је у Панчеву изненада умро војвода Стеван Шупљикац" (15 December 1848) [Textual record]. publications, ID: 147028231. Ulica Matice srpske 1, Novi Sad, Serbia: Politics, Digitalna BMS.
- Olchváry, Ödön (1902). A magyar függetlenségi harc 1848-1849-ben a Délvidéken (in Hungarian). Budapest: Márkus Samu Könyvnyomdája.
