= Boken =

Boken may refer to:

- Bob Boken (1908–1988), an American professional baseball player
- Bōken Ō, a former Japanese monthly magazine for youth
- Boken, Rawalpindi, a town in Punjab, Pakistan
- Boken, Jhelum, a village in Punjab, Pakistan
- Bokken, a Japanese sword

== See also ==
- Bokan (disambiguation)
