= Bokan =

Bokan may refer to:

== Places ==
- Boken, Rawalpindi, a village in Punjab, Pakistan
- Bukan, a city in Iran

== People ==
- Beau Bokan (born 1981), American musician and singer
- Dragoslav Bokan (born 1961), Serbian film director and writer
- Neda Bokan (born 1947), Serbian mathematician
- Nikola Bokan (born 1999), Serbian politician
- Tatjana Bokan, Serbian actress

== See also ==
- Boka (disambiguation)
- Bokane, a village in Croatia
- Bokani (disambiguation)
