= Zoran Marić =

Serbian football player (born 1960)

Personal information
- Full name: Zoran Marić
- Date of birth: 21 February 1960 (age 66)
- Place of birth: Boka, FPR Yugoslavia
- Height: 1.82 m (5 ft 11 1/2 in)
- Position: Striker

Youth career
- Novi Sad

Senior career*
Years	Team	Apps	(Gls)
1977–1979	Novi Sad	33	(4)
1979–1987	Vojvodina	212	(44)
1987–1991	Celta	88	(15)
1991–1993	Compostela	54	(8)
Total		387	(71)

International career
1983	Yugoslavia	2	(0)

Managerial career
- 1999: Compostela
- 2001: Compostela
- 2005–2006: Vojvodina
- 2009: Vojvodina
- 2010: Borac Banja Luka
- 2011–2012: Serbia U19
- 2012: Spartak Subotica
- 2013–2014: Proleter Novi Sad
- 2014–2015: Vojvodina
- 2016: Novi Pazar
- 2019–2020: Krupa
- * Club domestic league appearances and goals

Zoran Marić (Serbian Cyrillic: Зоран Mapић; born 21 February 1960) is a Serbian professional football manager and former player.

== Club career ==
Born in Boka, SFR Yugoslavia, Marić represented local clubs Novi Sad and Vojvodina in his country. In January 1988, aged almost 29, he was allowed to leave the Iron Curtain nation and move to Spain, where he would remain until his retirement five years later, with Galician clubs Celta and Compostela.

Marić competed in La Liga with Celta and Compostela, amassing totals of 71 matches and 13 goals, before finishing his playing career in 1993.

== International career ==
Marić earned two caps for Yugoslavia, both in 1983. He made his debut on 30 March in a 2–0 friendly win against Romania.

== Managerial career ==
Marić became a manager in 1999, notably working with former sides Compostela and Vojvodina. On 19 May 2010, he won the 2009–10 Bosnian Cup while in charge of Bosnian Premier League club Borac Banja Luka, who he led from January to August 2010.

After Borac, he worked as the head coach of the Serbia U19 national team from 2011 to 2012, then managed Spartak Subotica, Proleter Novi Sad, Vojvodina again and Novi Pazar.

On 21 June 2019, Marić became the new manager of, at the time, First League of RS club Krupa. On 8 May 2020, the 2019–20 First League of RS season ended abruptly due to the COVID-19 pandemic in Bosnia and Herzegovina and by default, Krupa, led by Marić, were crowned league champions and got promoted back to the Bosnian Premier League. On 15 September 2020, he left Krupa due to poor results.

== Personal life ==
Marić's son, Goran, was also a footballer and a striker. He too spent many years working in Spain, mainly with Celta B.

== Honours ==
=== Manager ===
Borac Banja Luka

- Bosnian Cup: 2009–10

Krupa

- First League of RS: 2019–20
