= Bogas =

Bogas may refer to:

== People ==
- Ed Bogas
- John Bogas, tenth-century Byzantine general

== Places ==
- Villanueva de Bogas, Toledo municipality
- Bauka, California, also known as Bogas
