= Sutjeska, Sečanj =

Sutjeska Сутјеска (Serbian) Sărcia (Romanian)
- Village (Selo)
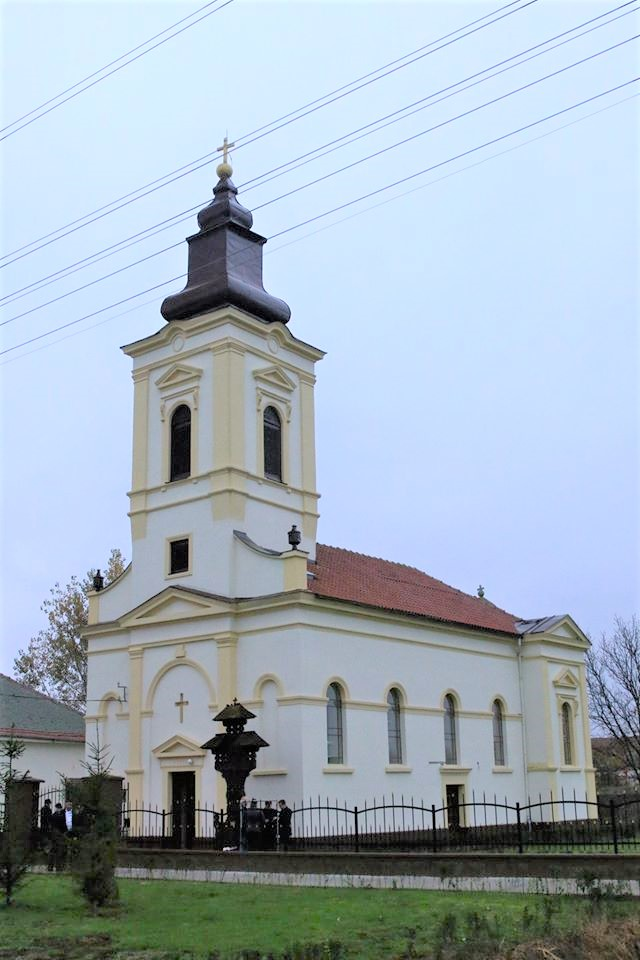
- The Romanian Orthodox Church

- Location within Serbia Sutjeska (Serbia) Sutjeska (Europe)
- Coordinates: 45°23′02″N 20°41′34″E
- Country: Serbia
- Province: Vojvodina
- District: Central Banat
- Municipalities: Sečanj
- Elevation: 53 m (174 ft)

Population (2002)
  - Sutjeska: 1,731
- Time zone: UTC+1 (CET)
  - Summer (DST): UTC+2 (CEST)
- Postal code: 23244
- Area code: +381(0)23
- Car plates: ZR

Sutjeska (Serbian Cyrillic: Сутјеска, pronounced [sûtjɛska]; Romanian: Sărcia) is a village in Serbia. It is situated in the Sečanj municipality, in the Central Banat District, Vojvodina province. The village has a Serb ethnic majority (60.21%) and a sizable Romanian minority (28.26%) and a population of 1,737 people (2002 census).

== Name ==
In Serbian the village is known as Sutjeska / Сутјеска (formerly also Sarča / Сарча), in Romanian as Sărcia, in Hungarian as Szárcsa, and in German as Sartscha.

== Historical population ==
- 1961: 2,752
- 1971: 2,450
- 1981: 2,145
- 1991: 1,976

== Notable people ==
- Ion Miloș (1930–2015), poet and translator

== See also ==
- List of places in Serbia
- List of cities, towns and villages in Vojvodina

== Gallery ==
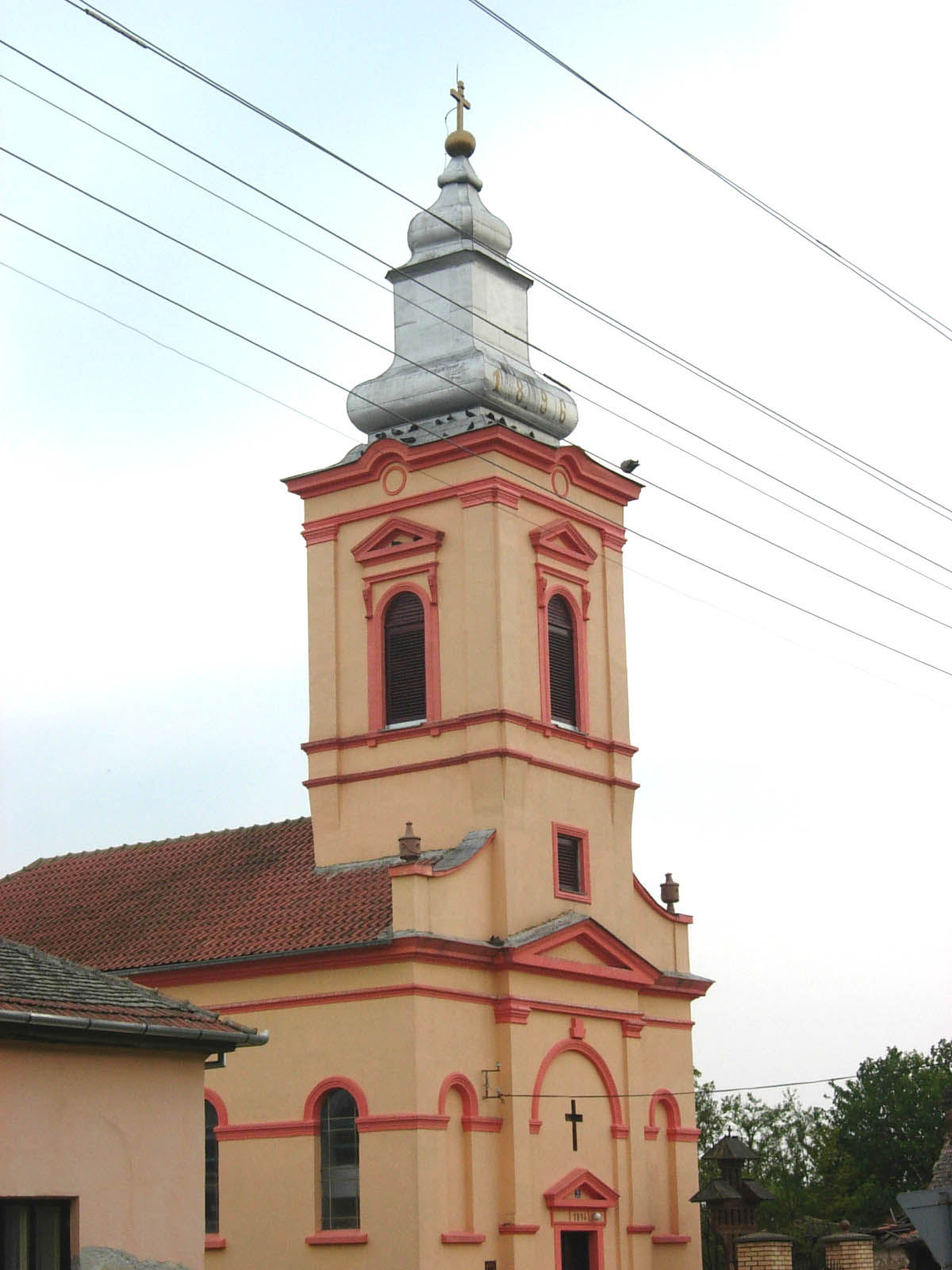
The Romanian Orthodox church.

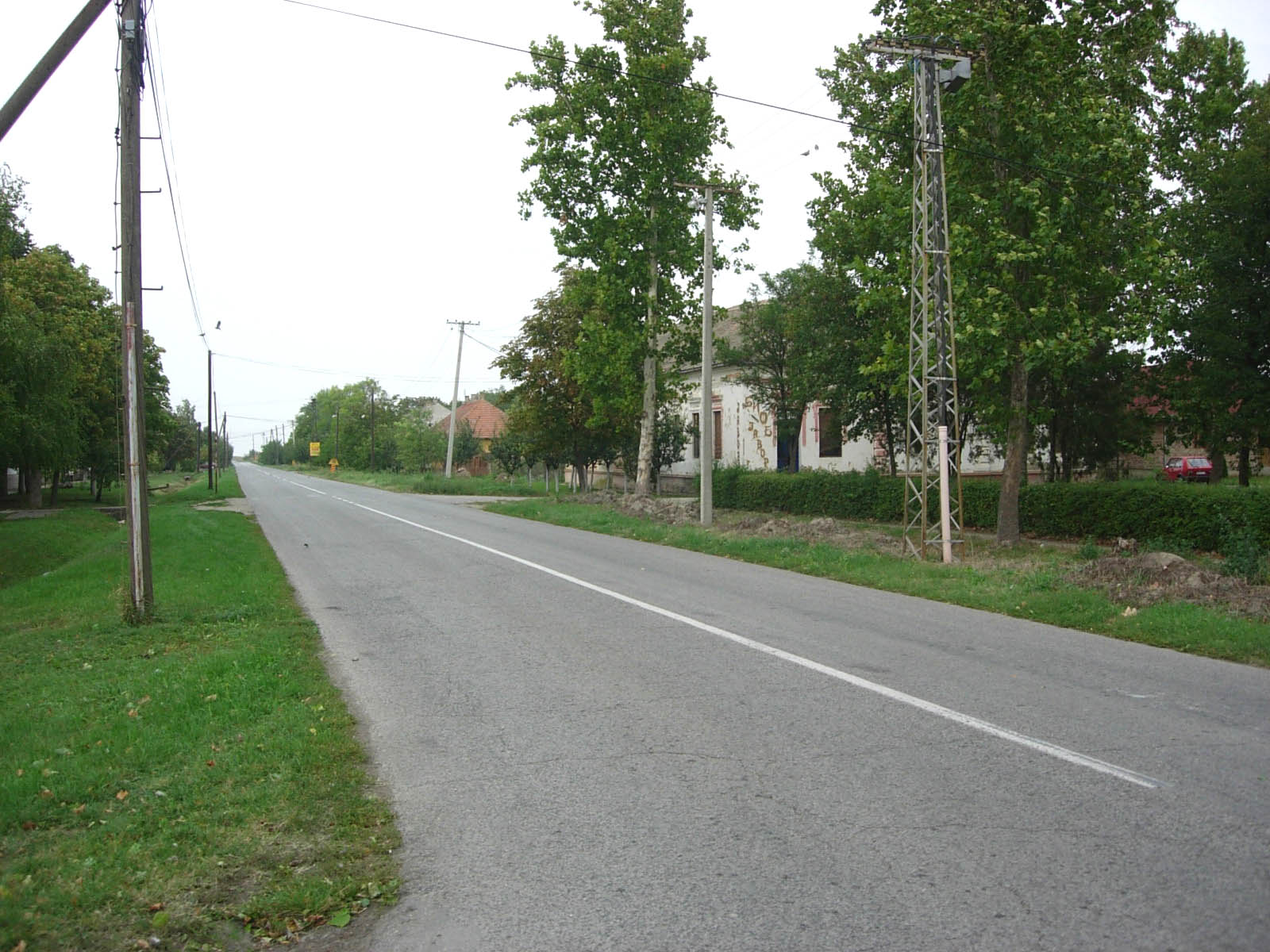
Street detail in the village.
