= Krajišnik, Sečanj =

Krajišnik Крајишник (Serbian)
- Village (Selo)
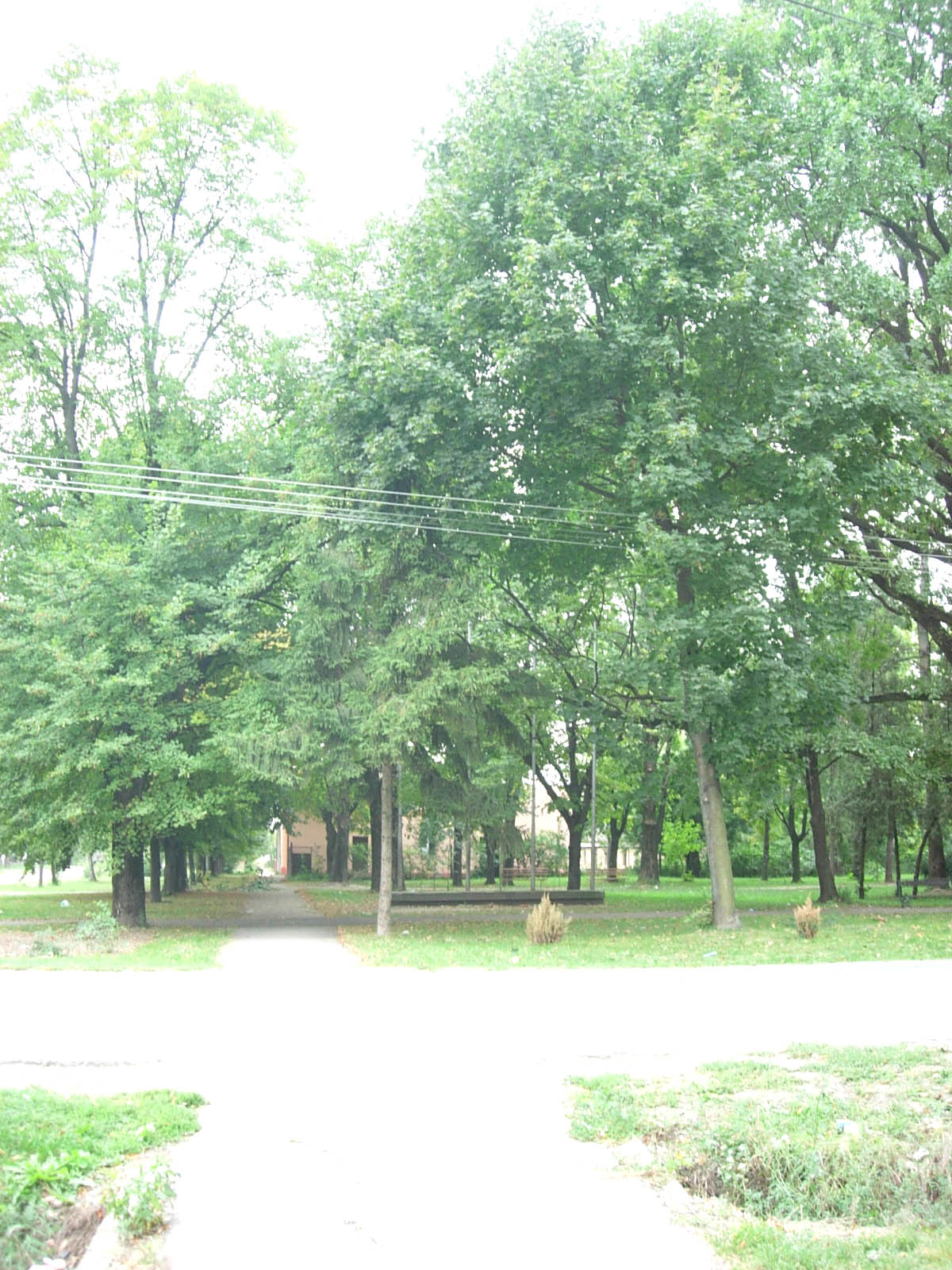
- Park in the centre of the village; a Catholic church of German Stefansfeld, demolished by the Yugoslav partisans in 1945s, stood here

- Location within Serbia Krajišnik (Serbia) Krajišnik (Europe)
- Coordinates: 45°27′06″N 20°43′27″E
- Country: Serbia
- Province: Vojvodina
- District: Central Banat
- Municipalities: Sečanj
- Elevation: 58 m (190 ft)

Population (2002)
  - Krajišnik: 2,241
- Time zone: UTC+1 (CET)
  - Summer (DST): UTC+2 (CEST)
- Postal code: 23231
- Area code: +381(0)23
- Car plates: ZR

Krajišnik (Serbian Cyrillic: Крајишник) is a village in Serbia. It is situated in the Sečanj municipality, Central Banat District, Vojvodina province. The village has a Serb ethnic majority (91.83%) and its population is 2,241 people (2002 census).

== Name ==
In Serbian, the village is known as Krajišnik or Крајишник, in German as Stefansfeld, in Hungarian as Istvánfölde (until 1890 Stefanföld), and in Croatian as Krajišnik. The name is derived from the word Krajina, and means "a resident of Krajina".

Its former name used in Serbian was Šupljaja / Шупљаја. This name is found in the records since 1660.

== Historical population ==
- 1869: 2,329
- 1900: 2,344
- 1948: 3,926
- 1953: 3,733
- 1961: 3,357
- 1971: 2,712
- 1981: 2,495
- 1991: 2,428

== See also ==
- List of places in Serbia
- List of cities, towns and villages in Vojvodina
