= Busenje =

Busenje Бусење (Serbian) Káptalanfalva (Hungarian)
- Village (Selo)
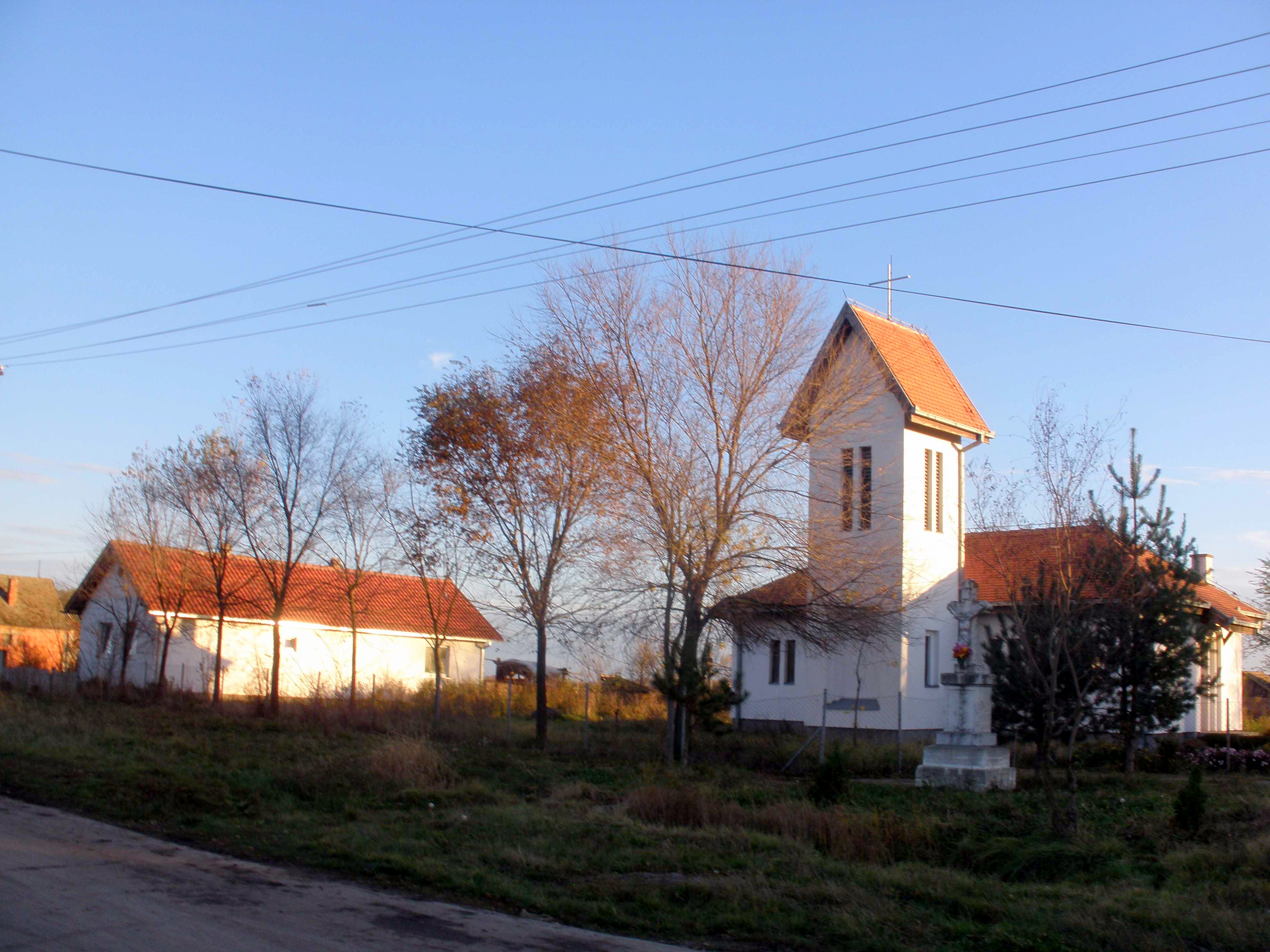
- Busenje - center of village with new Catholic church 1993.

- Location within Serbia Busenje (Serbia) Busenje (Europe)
- Coordinates: 45°26′06″N 20°49′11″E
- Country: Serbia
- Province: Vojvodina
- District: Central Banat
- Municipalities: Sečanj
- Elevation: 57 m (187 ft)

Population (2011)
  - Busenje: 64
- Time zone: UTC+1 (CET)
  - Summer (DST): UTC+2 (CEST)
- Area code: +381(0)23
- Car plates: ZR

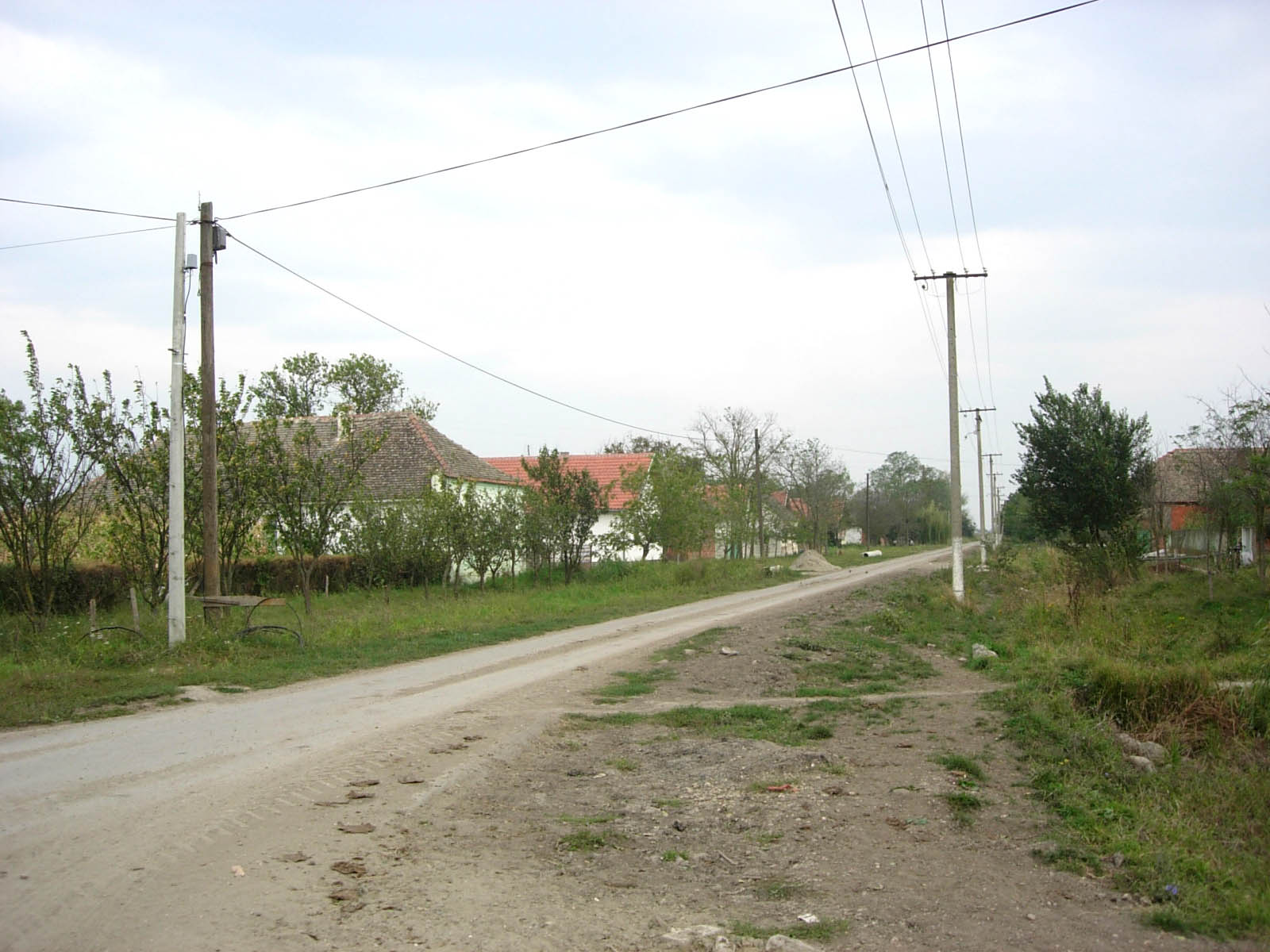
Street detail.

Busenje (Serbian Cyrillic: Бусење, Hungarian: Káptalanfalva, Romanian: Căptălan) is a village in Serbia. It is situated in the Sečanj municipality, in the Central Banat District, Vojvodina province. The village has a Hungarian ethnic majority (85.10%) and its population numbering 64 people (2011 census). The village was heavily damaged in the April 2005 floods, when the Tamiš river flooded the village, and almost half the population left the village.

== Historical population ==
- 1961: 224
- 1971: 185
- 1981: 141
- 1991: 119
- 2002: 94

== See also ==
- List of places in Serbia
- List of cities, towns and villages in Vojvodina
