= Bokani (disambiguation) =

Bokani is a village in Kneževo, Bosnia and Herzegovina.

Bokani may also refer to:

- Bokani Dam, in Maharashtra, India
- Bokani, a sub-district of Mokwa, Niger State, Nigeria
- Bokani Dyer (born 1986), Motswana-South African pianist, composer, and music producer
- Bokani Soko, Zambian lawyer and businessman
