= Šurjan =

Šurjan Шурјан (Serbian) Surján (Hungarian)
- Village (Selo)
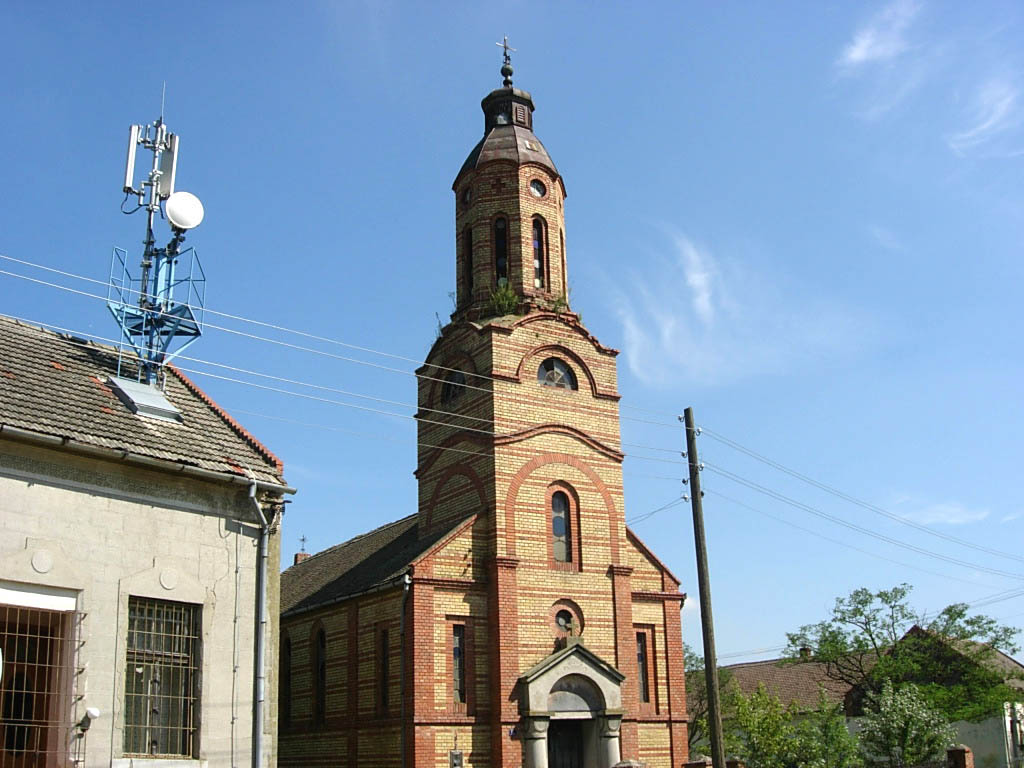
- The Orthodox Church

- Location within Serbia Šurjan (Serbia) Šurjan (Europe)
- Coordinates: 45°23′34″N 20°52′16″E
- Country: Serbia
- Province: Vojvodina
- District: Central Banat
- Municipalities: Sečanj
- Elevation: 82 m (269 ft)

Population (2002)
  - Šurjan: 330
- Time zone: UTC+1 (CET)
  - Summer (DST): UTC+2 (CEST)
- Postal code: 23254
- Area code: +381(0)23
- Car plates: ZR

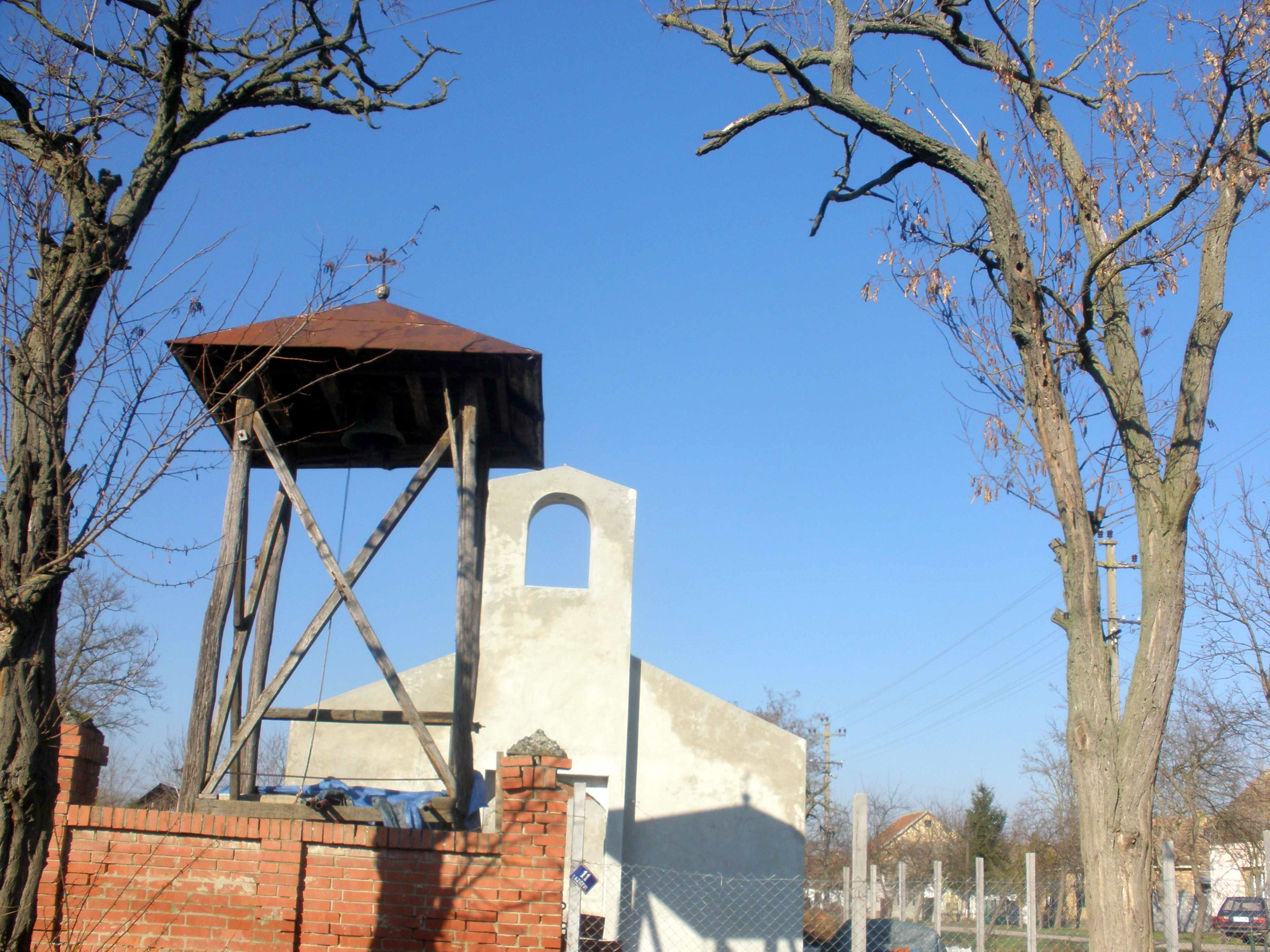
New Catholic church of Saint Catherine of Alexandria with old tower.

Šurjan (Serbian Cyrillic: Шурјан) is a village in Serbia. It is situated in the Sečanj municipality, in the Central Banat District, Vojvodina province. The population of the village is 330 (2002 census), including 145 Serbs (43.93%), 140 Hungarians (42.42%), and others.

== Name ==
In Serbian the village is known as Šurjan (Шурјан), in Hungarian as Surján, in Romanian as Șurian, and in German as Schurjan.

== Historical population ==
- 1869: 646
- 1900: 618
- 1921: 759
- 1931: 821
- 1948: 682
- 1953: 807
- 1961: 734
- 1971: 483
- 1981: 406
- 1991: 377

== See also ==
- List of places in Serbia
- List of cities, towns and villages in Vojvodina
