= Boʻka =

- City
- Location in Uzbekistan
- Coordinates: 40°48′49″N 69°12′07″E
- Country: Uzbekistan
- Region: Tashkent Region
- District: Boʻka District
- Town status: 1980

Population (2016)
  - Total: 22,200
- Time zone: UTC+5 (UZT)

Boʻka (Uzbek: Boʻka) is a city in Tashkent Region, Uzbekistan. It is the administrative centre of Boʻka District. Its population is 22,200 (2016).
