= Banatska Dubica =

Banatska Dubica Банатска Дубица (Serbian)
- Village (Selo)
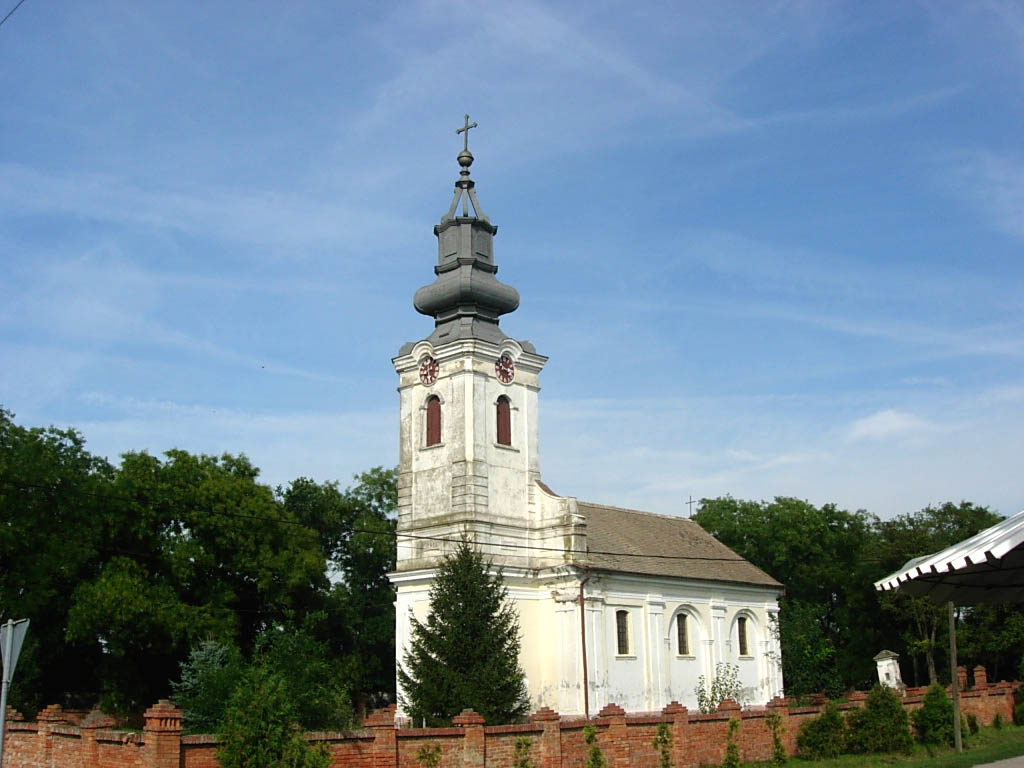
- The Orthodox Church

- Location within Serbia Banatska Dubica (Serbia) Banatska Dubica (Europe)
- Coordinates: 45°16′24″N 20°49′22″E
- Country: Serbia
- Province: Vojvodina
- District: Central Banat
- Municipalities: Sečanj
- Elevation: 43 m (141 ft)

Population (2002)
  - Banatska Dubica: 428
- Time zone: UTC+1 (CET)
  - Summer (DST): UTC+2 (CEST)
- Postal code: 23251
- Area code: +381(0)23
- Car plates: ZR

Banatska Dubica (Serbian Cyrillic: Банатска Дубица) is a village in Serbia. It is situated in the Sečanj municipality, in the Central Banat District, Vojvodina province. The village has a Serb ethnic majority (85.28%) and its population numbering 428 people (2002 census).

== Historical population ==
- 1961: 847
- 1971: 660
- 1981: 566
- 1991: 507

== See also ==
- List of places in Serbia
- List of cities, towns and villages in Vojvodina
