= Boka (surname) =

Boka is a surname of multiple origins. Notable people with the surname include:

- Arthur Boka (born 1983), Ivorian footballer
- Ernest Boka (1928–1964), Ivorian politician
- Olta Boka (born 1991), Albanian singer

== See also ==
- Bóka
