= Jarkovac =

Jarkovac Јарковац (Serbian) Árkod (Hungarian) Iarcovăț (Romanian)
- Village (Selo)
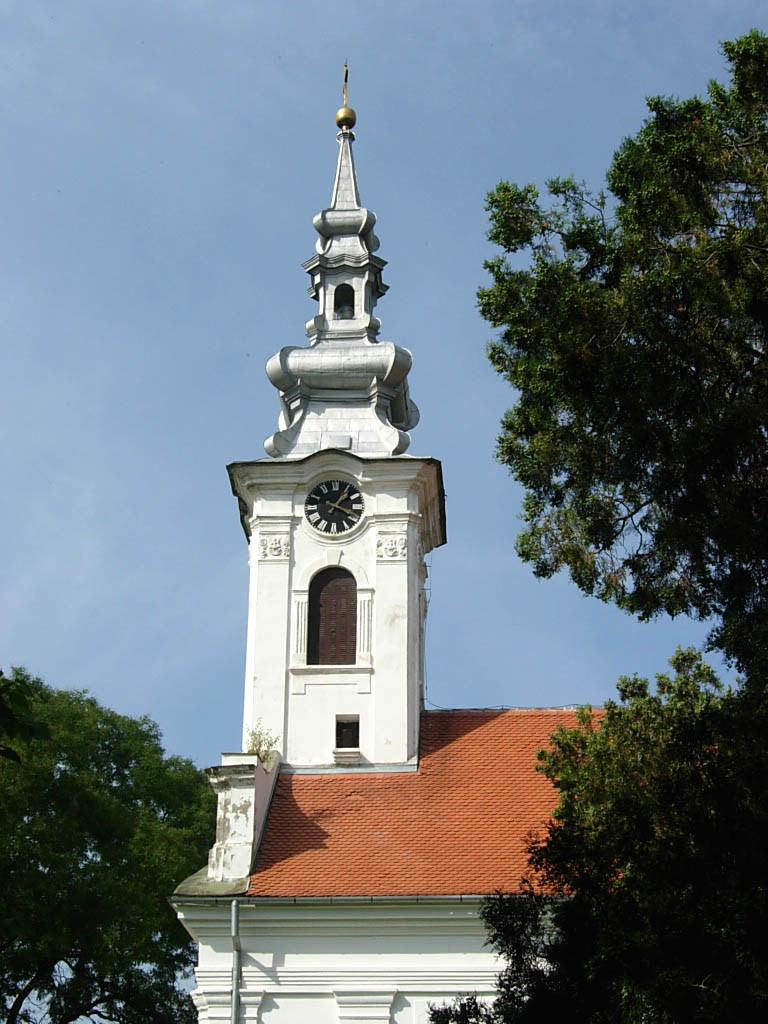
- The Orthodox Church

- Location within Serbia Jarkovac (Serbia) Jarkovac (Europe)
- Coordinates: 45°16′05″N 20°45′18″E
- Country: Serbia
- Province: Vojvodina
- District: Central Banat
- Municipalities: Sečanj
- Elevation: 50 m (160 ft)

Population (2022)
  - Jarkovac: 1,275
- Time zone: UTC+1 (CET)
  - Summer (DST): UTC+2 (CEST)
- Postal code: 23250
- Area code: +381(0)23
- Car plates: ZR

Jarkovac (Serbian Cyrillic: Јарковац) is a village in Serbia. It is situated in the Sečanj municipality, Central Banat District, Vojvodina province. The village has a Serb ethnic majority (76.27%), with Hungarian (8.69%) and Romanian (5.72%) minorities. Its population was 1,817 people in the 2002 census.

== Name ==
In Hungarian, the name of the village is Árkod. In German the name is Jarkowatz.

== Historical population ==
- 1961: 2,963
- 1971: 2,624
- 1981: 2,291
- 1991: 2,155
- 2002: 1,817
- 2022: 1,275

== Ethnic groups ==
In 1910, there were 3,019 people living in Jarkovac: 2,602 Serbians, 313 Germans, 54 Hungarians, 14 Romanians, 6 Croatians, 4 Slovaks and 26 others.

== See also ==
- List of places in Serbia
- List of cities, towns and villages in Vojvodina
