= Neuzina =

Neuzina Неузина (Serbian) Nezsény (Hungarian)
- Village (Selo)
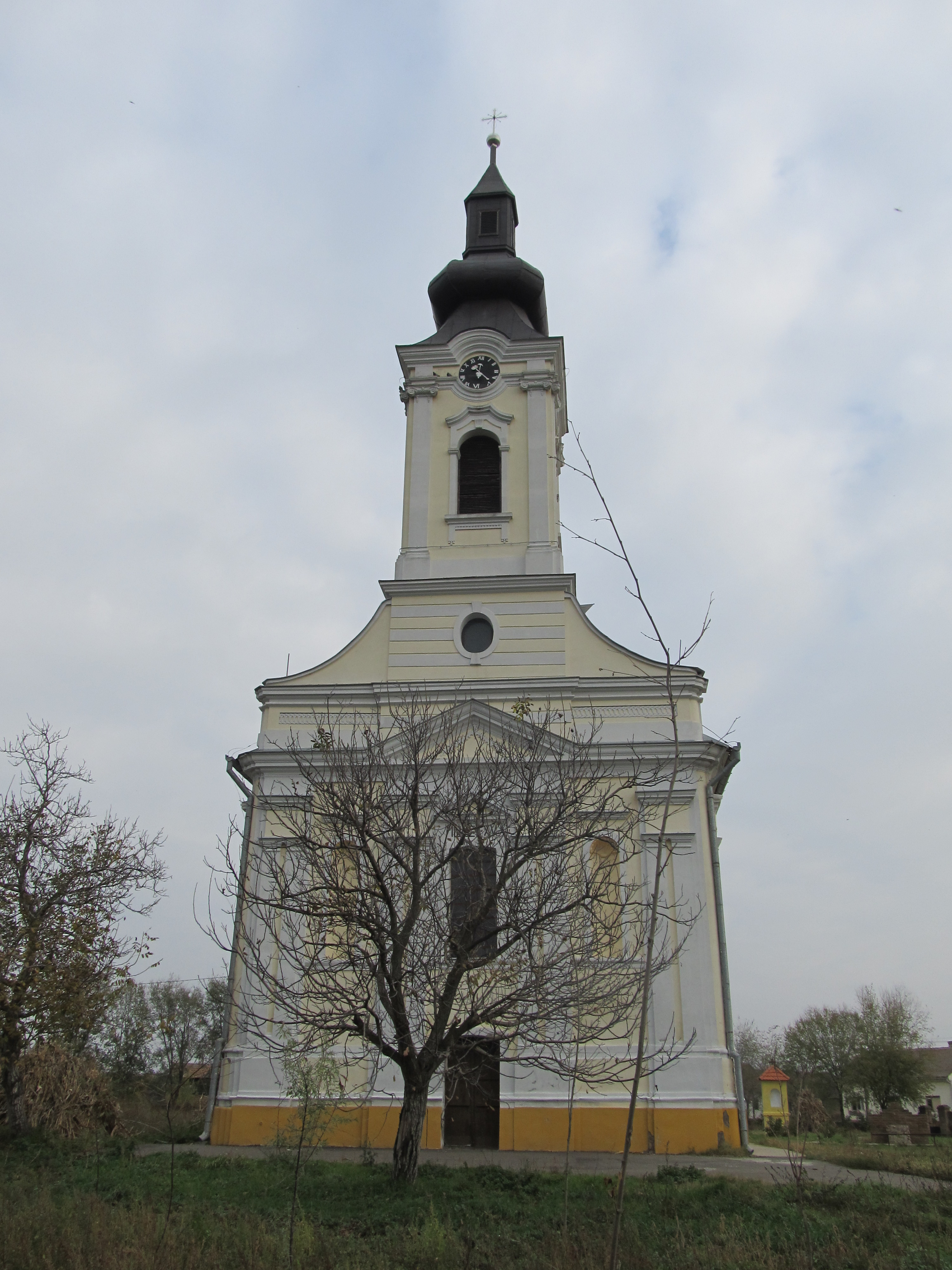
- Serbian Orthodox church in Neuzina

- Location within Serbia Neuzina (Serbia) Neuzina (Europe)
- Coordinates: 45°20′23″N 20°42′26″E
- Country: Serbia
- Province: Vojvodina
- District: Central Banat
- Municipalities: Sečanj
- Elevation: 47 m (154 ft)

Population (2002)
  - Neuzina: 1,371
- Time zone: UTC+1 (CET)
  - Summer (DST): UTC+2 (CEST)
- Postal code: 23245
- Area code: +381(0)23
- Car plates: ZR

Neuzina (Serbian Cyrillic: Неузина) is a village in Serbia. It is situated in the Sečanj municipality, in the Central Banat District, Vojvodina province. The village is ethnically mixed and its population numbering 1,371 people (2002 census), including 680 Serbs (49.59%), 488 Hungarians (35.59%) and 95 Roma (6.92%) before others.

== Name ==
In Serbian the village is known as Neuzina (Неузина), in Hungarian as Nezsény, in Croatian as Neuzina or Hrvatska Neuzina, and in German as Neusin.

== History ==
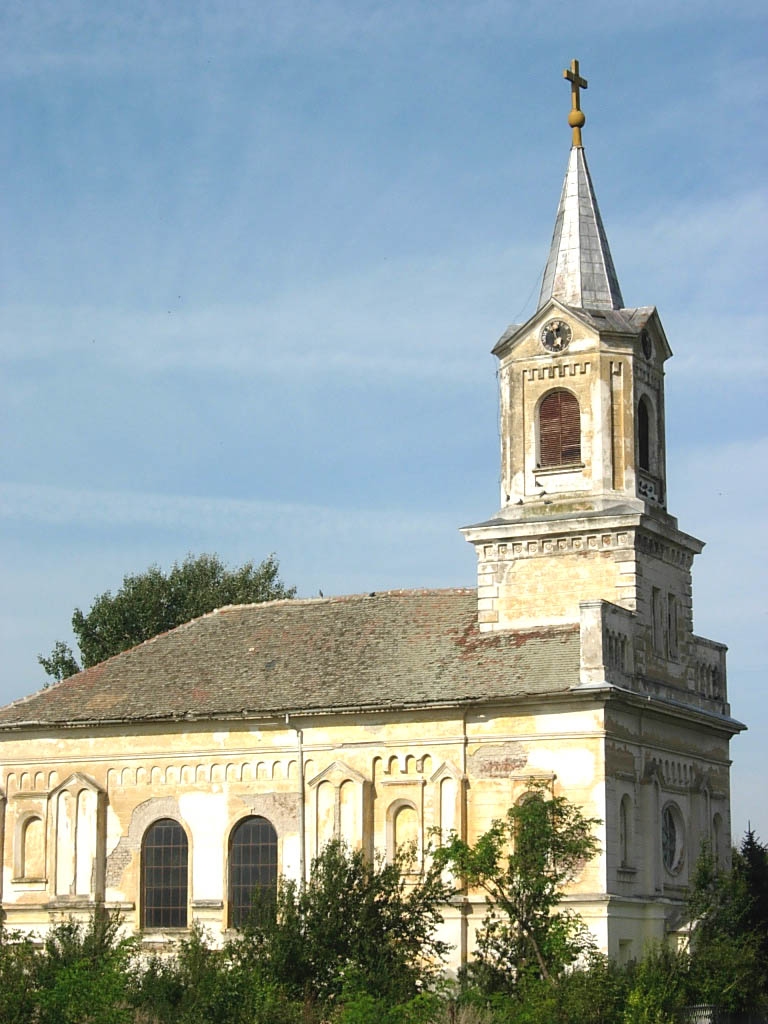
The Dedication of Saint Mary Major Catholic Church

Historically, there were two Neuzina's, that later merged: Srpska Neuzina (Serb Neuzina) and Hrvatska Neuzina (Croat Neuzina).

Srpska Neuzina (Serbian Cyrillic: Српска Неузина, Croatian: Srpska Neuzina, Hungarian: Szerb-Neuzina, German: Serbisch Neusin) was few miles southwards from Sarča (today Sutjeska) and few miles westwards from Sečanj, while Hrvatska Neuzina (Serbian Cyrillic: Хрватска Неузина, Croatian: Hrvatska Neuzina, Hungarian: Horvát-Neuzina, German: Kroatisch Neusin) was in the very neighbourhood, located southwestwards from Srpska Neuzina, few miles northeastwards from Botoš.

Hrvatska Neuzina got its name after Croatian settlers (nobles that originated from Turopolje), that were settled there by the Diocese of Zagreb on its possessions.

In 1910, Srpska Neuzina was mainly populated by Serbs and Hrvatska Neuzina mainly by Croats. Other ethnic groups in these villages included Hungarians and Germans. German population mostly left from the area after World War II and the Croat population also declined over time.

== Historical population ==
- 1961: 2,401
- 1971: 1,955
- 1981: 1,657
- 1991: 1,502

== See also ==
- List of places in Serbia
- List of cities, towns and villages in Vojvodina
