= Boʻka District =

Coordinates: 40.8120°N 69.2049°E

- District
- Boʻka tumani
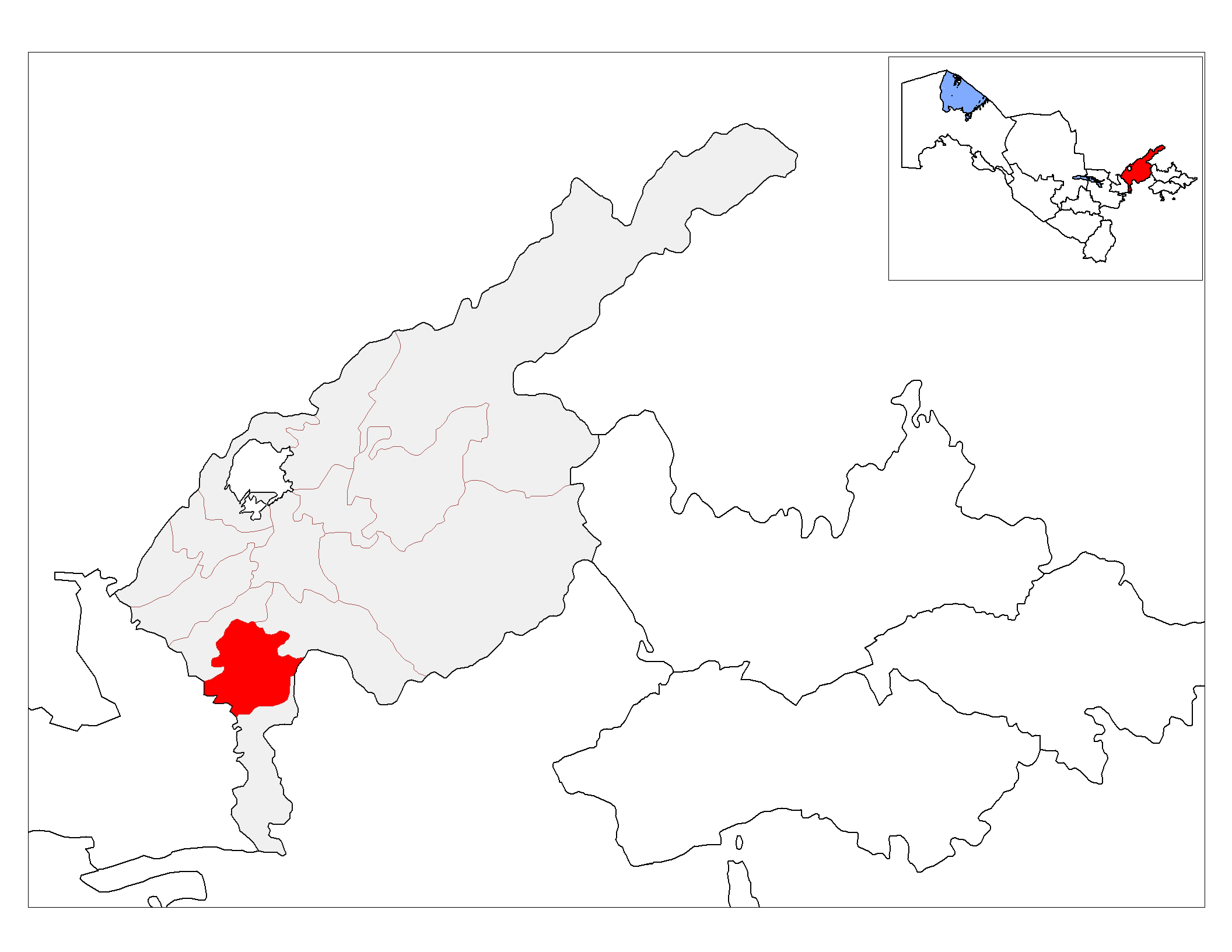
- Country: Uzbekistan
- Region: Tashkent Region
- Capital: Boʻka
- Established: 1943

Area
  - Total: 590 km^{2} (230 sq mi)

Population (2021)
  - Total: 127,500
  - Density: 220/km^{2} (560/sq mi)
- Time zone: UTC+5 (UZT)

Boʻka District is a district of Tashkent Region in Uzbekistan. The capital lies at the city Boʻka. It has an area of 590 km^{2} (230 sq mi) and it had 127,500 inhabitants in 2021. The district consists of one city (Boʻka) and 8 rural communities (Iftixor, Qoraqoʻyli, Turon, Koʻkorol, Qoʻshtepa, Namuna, Rovot, Chigʻatoy).
