= Bóka =

Bóka is a surname. Notable people with the surname include:

- Bendegúz Bóka (born 1993), Hungarian handballer
- István Bóka (born 1964), Hungarian politician
- János Bóka (born 1978), Hungarian politician

== See also ==
- Boka (surname)
