= Bokani Soko =

- Born: Lusaka, Zambia
- Education: University of Zambia; ZIALE
- Occupation: Lawyer
- Years active: 2004–present
- Employers: Grandview International; FerdJere & Co
- Children: 2
- Website: http://neriainvestments.com/; http://www.grandviewint.com/

Bokani Soko is a Zambian lawyer (barrister) and businessman specialising in international trade. He sits on the boards of various companies.

== Early life and education ==
Soko attended University of Zambia from 2002 to 2006 where he obtained a Bachelor of Laws (Legum Baccalaureus; LL.B) degree.

In 2007, Soko was admitted to the bar after passing a Legal Practitioners Qualification Examination (LPQE) at the Zambia Institute of Advanced Legal Education, which is a prerequisite postgraduate certificate for one to practice law in Zambia.

== Legal profession career ==
Soko is a lawyer and advocate of the High Court of Zambia, having obtained an LL.B. degree from the University of Zambia and a Bar Practicing Certificate from the Zambia Institute of Advanced Legal Education (ZIALE). He was a managing partner in a premier law firm, Ferd Jere and Co Legal Practitioners, where he specializes in litigation, business advisory and general counsel. As a practicing lawyer, he has played various roles as an official, lawyer and advisor in various business in Zambia and other Southern African countries. He has represented a number of companies on wide range of issues that includes energy, agriculture, taxation, environment and disputes arising from development agreements with governments.

== Professional memberships ==
Currently, Soko is a member of the Law Association of Zambia.

== Personal life ==
Soko is married with children.
