= Sečanj =

Sečanj Сечањ (Serbian) Torontálszécsány (Hungarian) Seceani (Romanian)
- Town and municipality
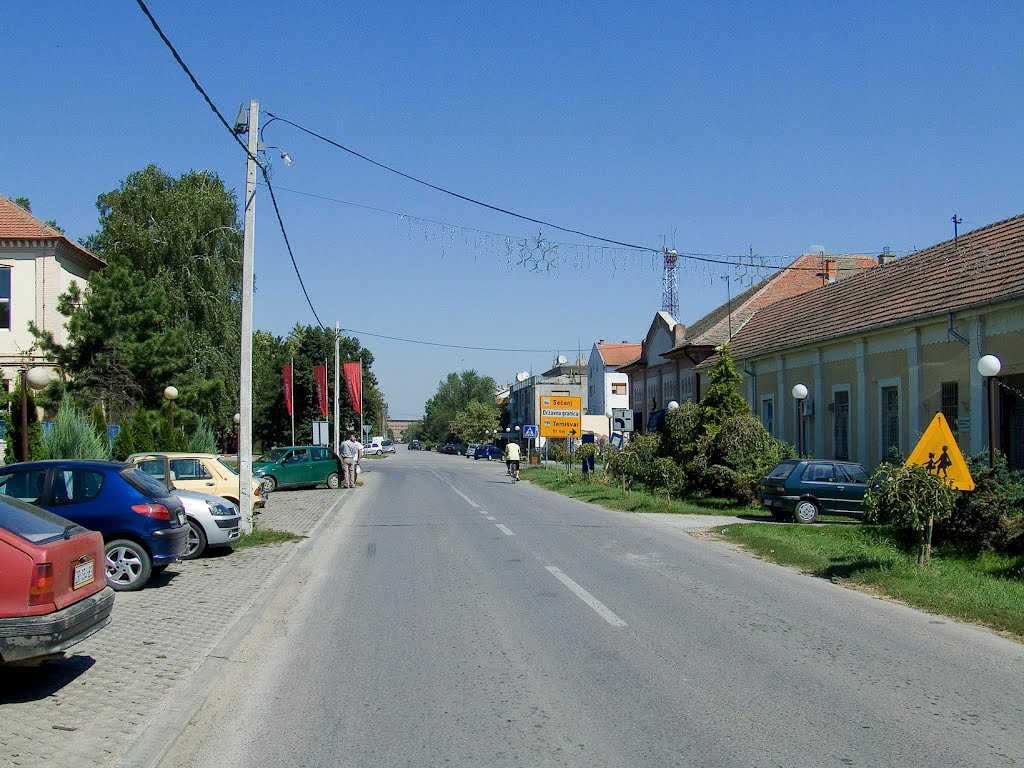
- Downtown Sečanj

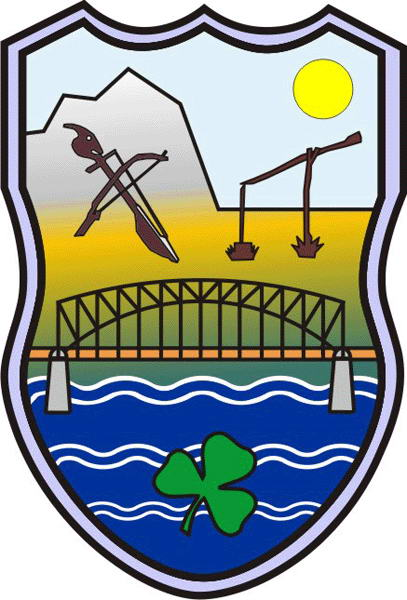
- Coat of arms

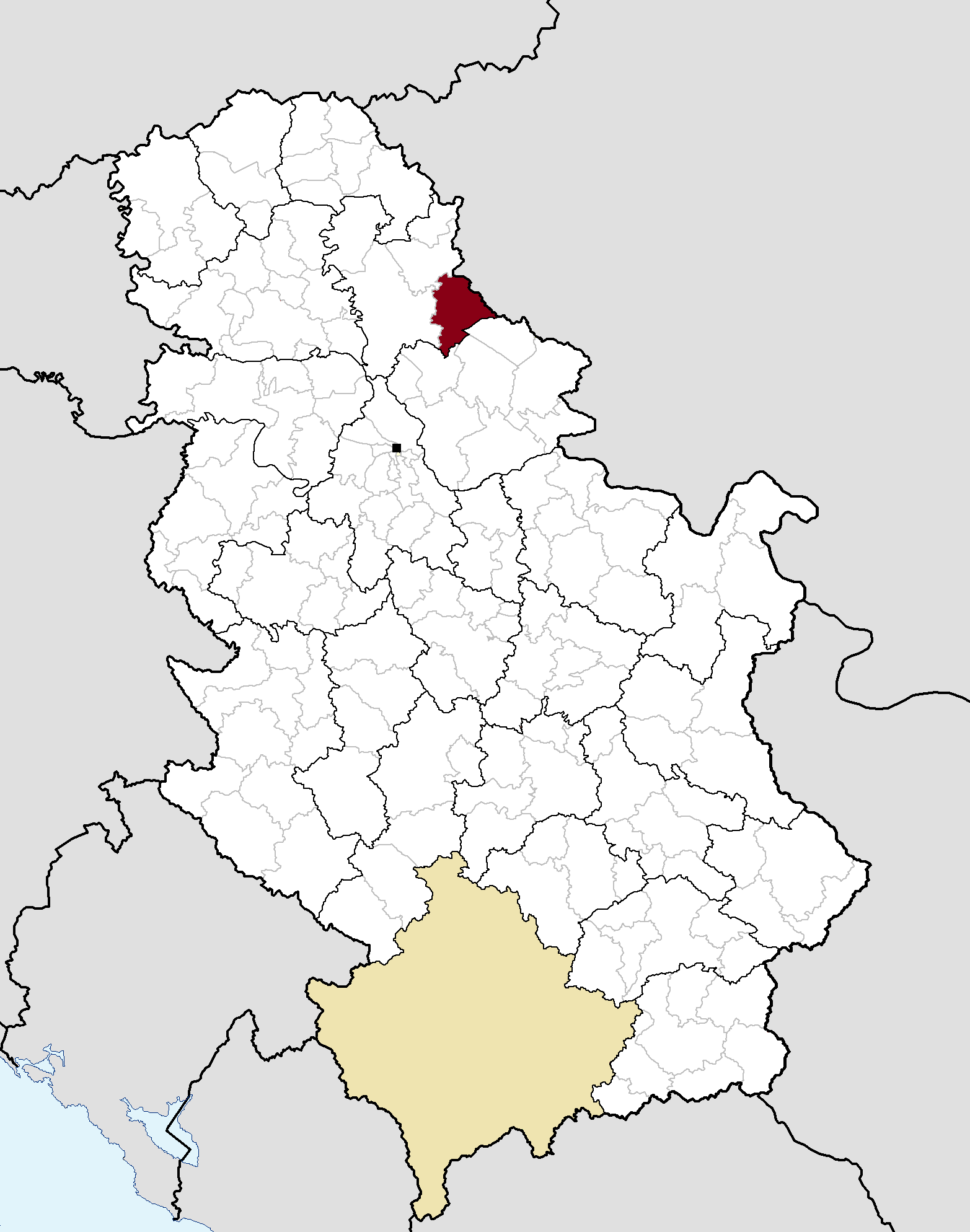
- Location of Sečanj within Serbia
- Coordinates: 45°22′00″N 20°46′21″E
- Country: Serbia
- Province: Vojvodina
- District: Central Banat

Government
  - Mayor: Nebojša Meljanac (SNS)

Area
  - Total: 523 km^{2} (201.9 sq mi)
- Elevation: 77 m (253 ft)

Population (2022)
  - borough: 1,889
  - Municipality: 10,544
- Time zone: UTC+1 (CET)
  - Summer (DST): UTC+2 (CEST)
- Postal code: 23240
- Area code: +381(0)23
- Car plates: ZR
- Official languages: Serbian together with Hungarian and Romanian

Sečanj (Serbian Cyrillic: Сечањ, Hungarian: Torontálszécsány) is a town located in the Central Banat District of the autonomous province of Vojvodina, Serbia. As of 2022 census, the town itself had a population of 1,889, while the Sečanj municipality has 10,544 inhabitants.

== Name ==
"Sečanj" is a Slavic name for the first month in the calendar year. The Serbian Ekavian variant of this name was eventually replaced with the Latin-derived "Januar", while the Croatian Ijekavian variant "Siječanj" remains in use in Croatia.

In Serbian and Croatian, the town is known as Sečanj (Сечањ), in Hungarian as Szécsány or Torontálszécsány, in German as Setschan or Petersheim, and in Romanian as Seceani.

Serbian, Hungarian, and Romanian language are officially used by municipal authorities.

== Demographics ==
Historical population
Year	Pop.	±% p.a.
1948	25,684	—
1953	26,110	+0.33%
1961	25,519	−0.29%
1971	21,938	−1.50%
1981	19,501	−1.17%
1991	18,438	−0.56%
2002	16,377	−1.07%
2011	13,267	−2.31%
2022	10,544	−2.07%

According to the 2011 census, the population of the municipality of Sečanj was 13,267 inhabitants.

=== Ethnic composition ===
The settlements with Serb ethnic majority are: Sečanj, Banatska Dubica, Boka, Jarkovac, Jaša Tomić, Krajišnik, and Sutjeska. The settlement with Hungarian ethnic majority is Busenje. Ethnically mixed settlements with relative Serb majority are: Konak, Neuzina and Šurjan.

Ethnic group	Population 2011	%
Serbs	9,165	69.08%
Hungarians	1,691	12.75%
Romani	714	5.38%
Romanians	566	4.27%
Croats	113	0.85%
Bulgarians	87	0.66%
Slovaks	52	0.39%
Yugoslavs	50	0.38%
Macedonians	39	0.29%
Germans	39	0.29%
Montenegrins	24	0.18%
Others	727	5.48%
Total	13,267	

== Inhabited places ==
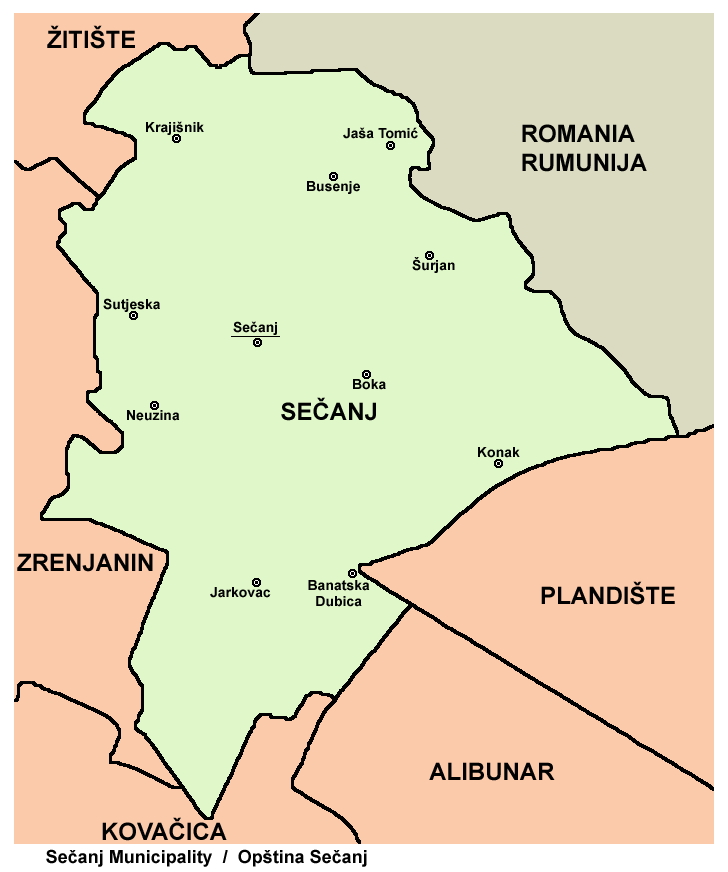
Map of Sečanj municipality

The Sečanj municipality includes also the following villages:

- Jaša Tomić
- Banatska Dubica
- Boka
- Busenje (Hungarian: Káptalanfalva)
- Jarkovac
- Konak
- Krajišnik
- Neuzina
- Sutjeska
- Šurjan

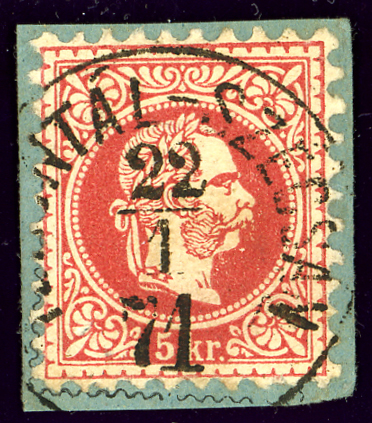
TORONTÁL-SZÉCSAN

== Twin towns – sister cities ==
- Azov, Russia (2018)

== See also ==
- List of cities in Serbia
- List of cities, towns and villages in Vojvodina
