= Bauka, California =

Human settlement in United States of America

Bauka (also, Bogas, Boka, and Booku) is a former Maidu settlement in Butte County, California, United States. It was located near Gridley on the right bank of the Feather River; its precise location is unknown.
