= Boka (Sečanj) =

Boka Бока (Serbian) Bóka (Hungarian)
- Village (Selo)
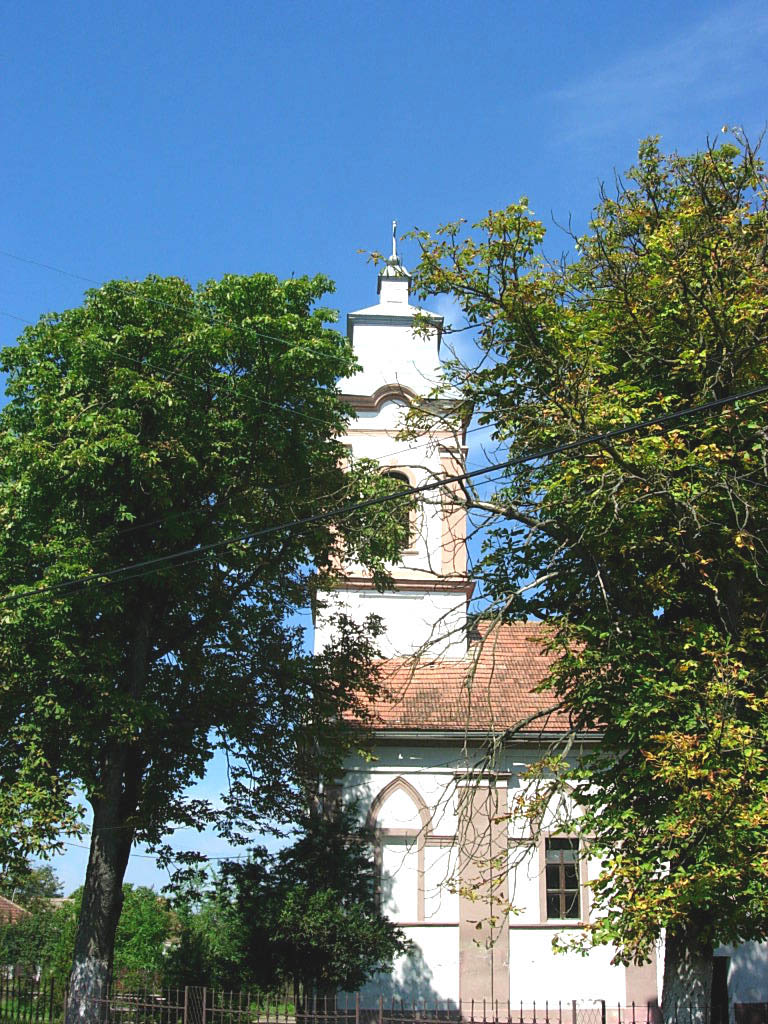
- The Orthodox Church

- Location within Serbia Boka (Serbia) Boka (Europe)
- Coordinates: 45°21′10″N 20°49′28″E
- Country: Serbia
- Province: Vojvodina
- District: Central Banat
- Municipalities: Sečanj
- Elevation: 53 m (174 ft)

Population (2002)
  - Boka: 1,734
- Time zone: UTC+1 (CET)
  - Summer (DST): UTC+2 (CEST)
- Postal code: 23252
- Area code: +381(0)23
- Car plates: ZR

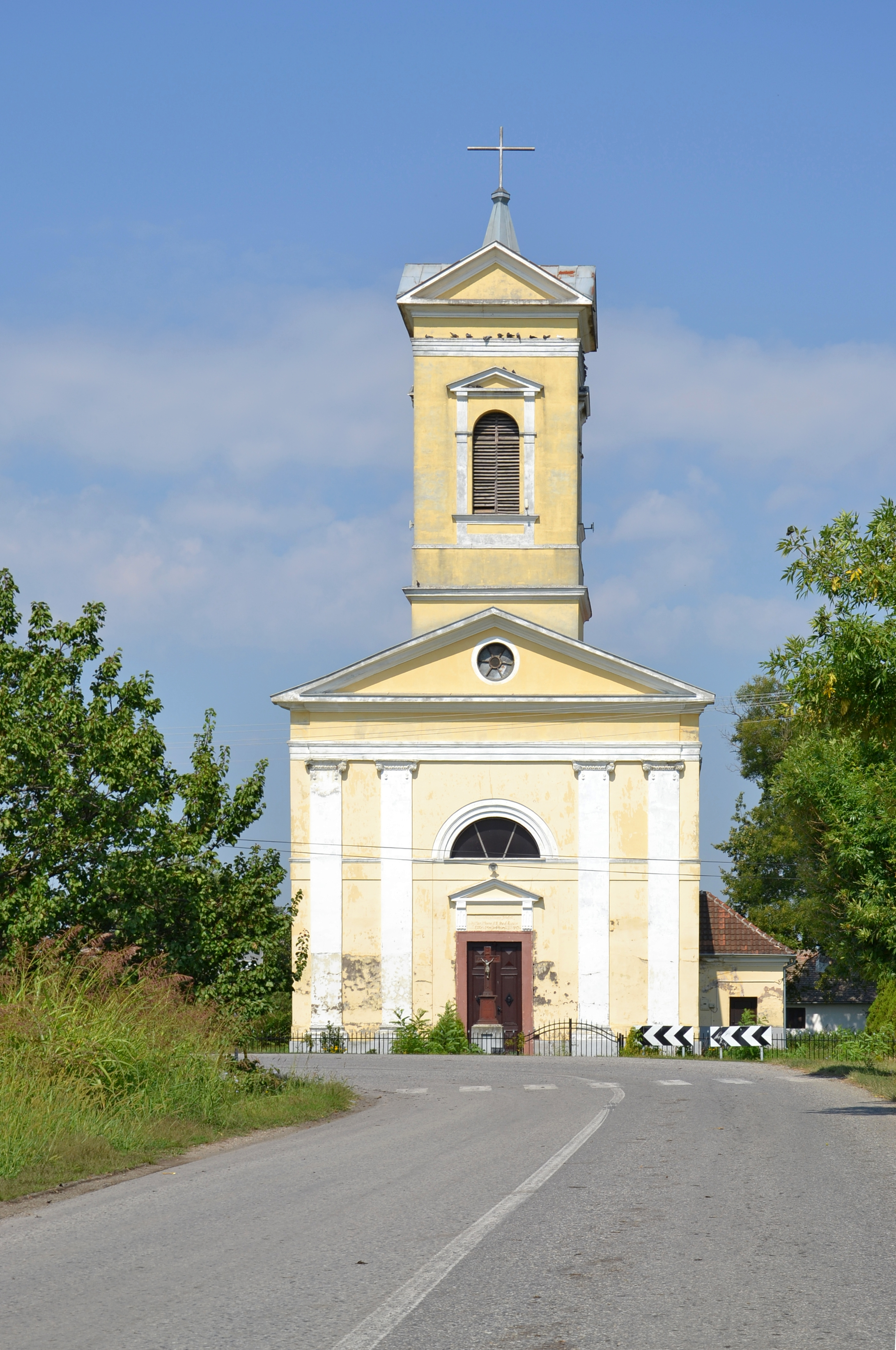
The Annunciation Catholic Church

Boka (Serbian Cyrillic: Бока) is a village located in the Sečanj municipality, in the Central Banat District of Serbia. It is situated in the Autonomous Province of Vojvodina. The village has a Serb ethnic majority (57.32%) with large Hungarian minority (27.79%) and its population numbering 1,734 people (2002 census).

== Name ==
In Serbian, the village is known as Boka (Бока), in Hungarian as Bóka, in German as Boka, and in Romanian as Boka.

== Location ==
It is situated in the Autonomous Province of Vojvodina, just on the east-southeast from the Sečanj.

== History ==
Historically, there were two Boka's, that later merged: Srpska Boka (Serb Boka) i Hrvatska Boka (Croat Boka).
Srpska Boka (in Hungarian sources: Szerb-Bóka) was in the neighbourhood of Sečanj, while Hrvatska Boka (in Hungarian sources: Horvát-Bóka) was located eastwards from Srpska Boka. Hrvatska Boka got its name after Croatian settlers (nobles that originated from Turopolje), that were settled there by the Diocese of Zagreb on its possessions.

== Ethnic groups (2002) ==
- Serbs = 994
- Hungarians = 482
- Croats = 83
- Romanians = 47
- Yugoslavs = 16

== Historical population ==
- 1961: 3,260
- 1971: 2,673
- 1981: 2,246
- 1991: 1,992
- 2002: 1,734

== See also ==
- List of places in Serbia
- List of cities, towns and villages in Vojvodina
