= Boken, Rawalpindi =

Boken, Punjab
- Village and union council
- Interactive map of Boken, Punjab
- Country: Pakistan
- Region: Punjab Province
- District: Rawalpindi District
- Time zone: UTC+5 (PST)

Boken or Bokan is a village in Union Council Raman of Gujar Khan Tehsil in the Punjab Province of Pakistan and is located at 33°9′N 73°4′E with an altitude of 489 metres (1,604 ft).
