= Slovak Evangelical Church, Šid =

Slovak Evangelical Church
- Slovenská evanjelická cirkva Словачка евангеличка црква
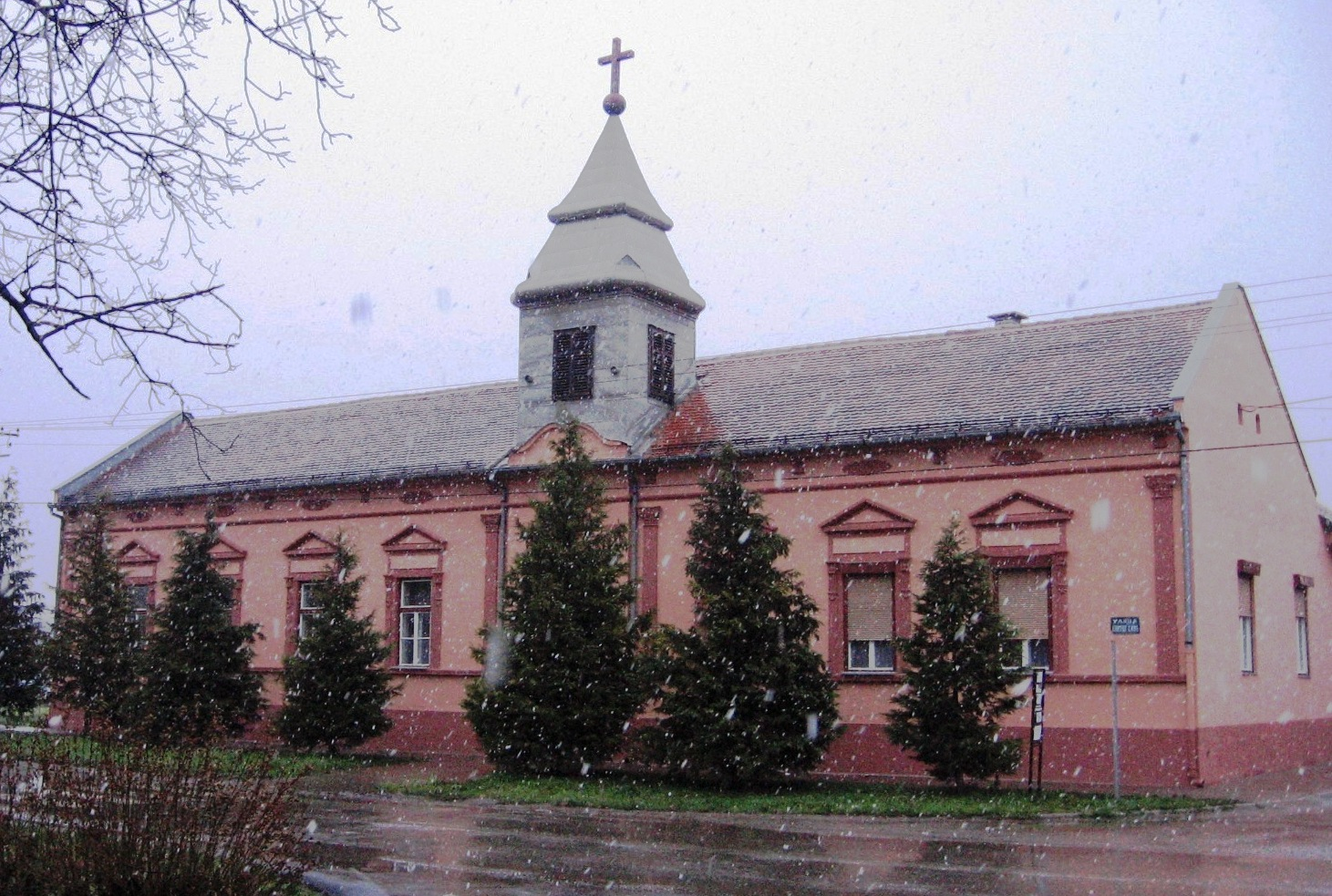
- Slovak Evangelical Church, pictured in 2010

- Shown within Serbia
- 45°7′N 19°15′E
- Country: Serbia
- Language: Slovak
- Denomination: Lutheranism

Architecture
- Functional status: active
- Groundbreaking: 1909
- Completed: 1910

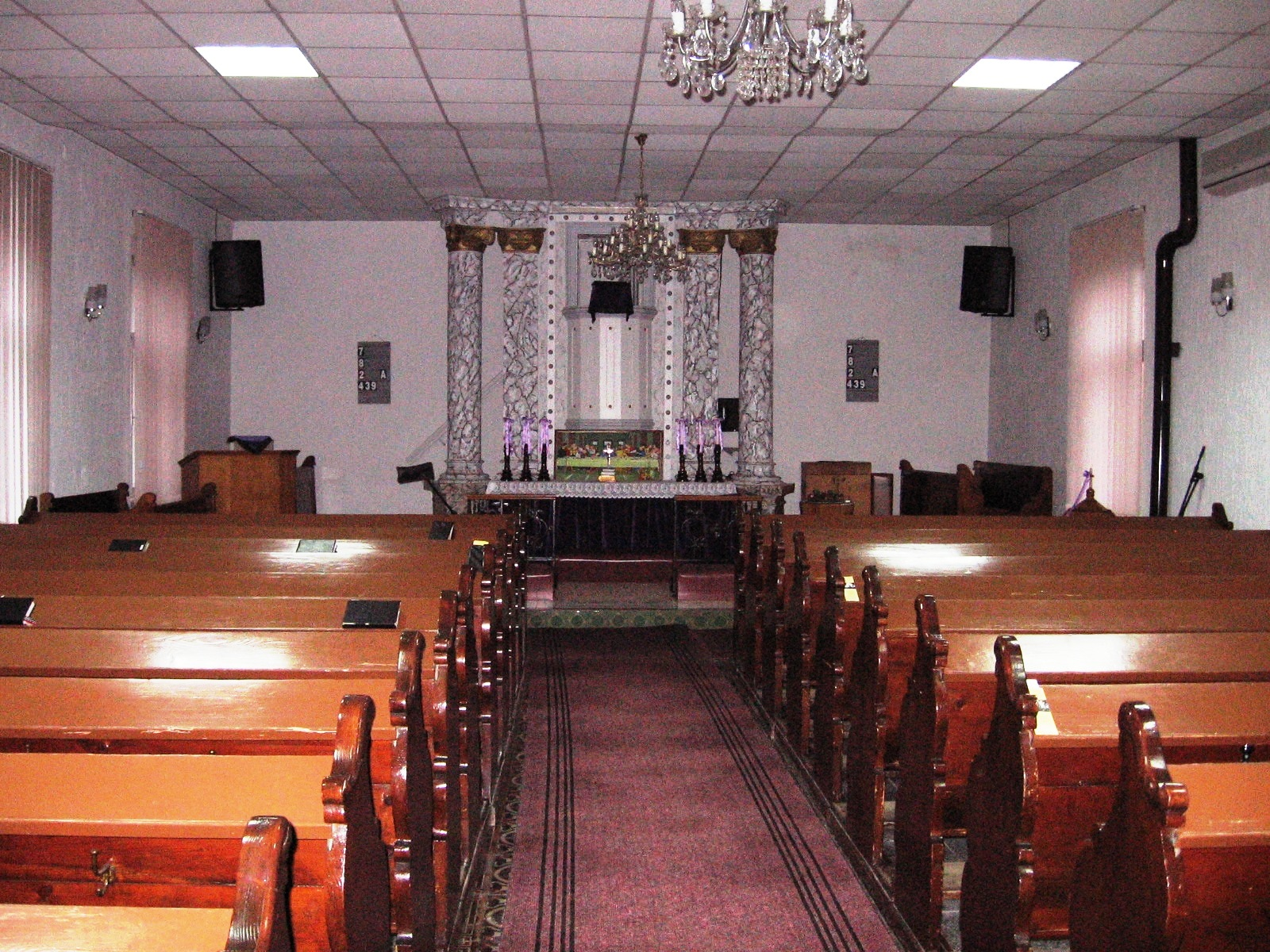
Church interior

Slovak Evangelical Church in Šid, Serbia, is a Lutheran church under jurisdiction of the Slovak Evangelical Church of the Augsburg Confession in Serbia, serving the local ethnic Slovak community. Over the years, it was the main church for the Lutherans, with other churches in the town being either Eastern Orthodox, Roman Catholic, or Greek Catholic.

== History ==
The church and its parish played a prominent role during the time of immigration of Slovaks to town in mid-19th century, helping them in maintaining their spiritual and national identity. Before the establishment of the local Slovak parish in 1897, the local community was a part of the nearby Bingula parish. The church building was constructed in 1910. Later on, the Šid church was a main church for up to 24 other associated communities in the regions of Syrmia, Semberija, and Slavonia including villages of Bosut, Jamena, Komletinci, Bijeljina, Vašica, Sot, and Višnjićevo.

== See also ==
- Protestantism in Serbia
- Slovak Evangelical Church, Novi Sad
- Slovak Evangelical Church, Stara Pazova
- Slovak Evangelical Church, Kisač
- Slovaks of Serbia
