= Slovak Evangelical Church, Kisač =

Church in Kisač, Serbia

Coordinates: 45°20′55″N 19°43′37″E

Slovak Evangelical Church
- Slovenská evanjelická cirkva Словачка евангеличка црква
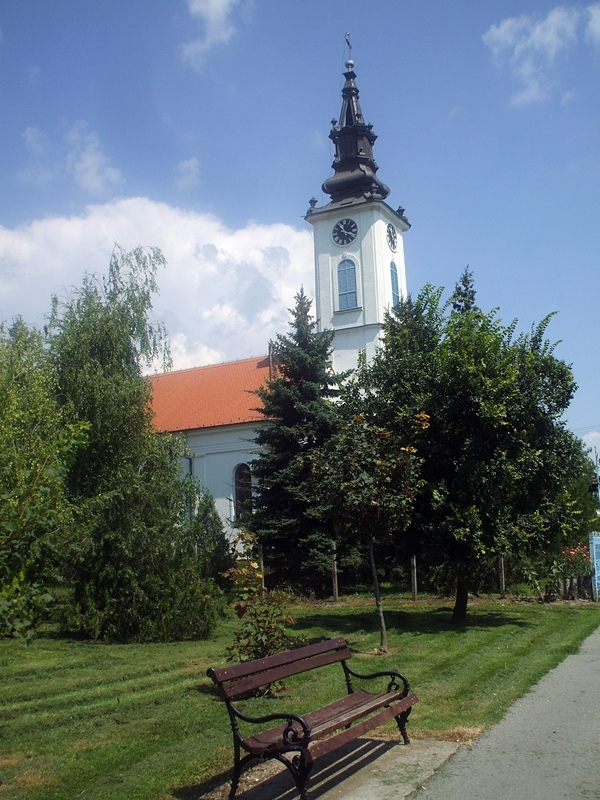
- Slovak Evangelical Church, pictured in 2011
- Slovak Evangelical Church
- Location: Kisač
- Country: Serbia
- Language: Slovak
- Denomination: Lutheranism

Architecture
- Functional status: active
- Groundbreaking: 1797
- Completed: 1799

The Slovak Evangelical Church in Kisač, Serbia, is a Lutheran church under jurisdiction of the Slovak Evangelical Church of the Augsburg Confession in Serbia, serving local ethnic Slovak community.

== History ==
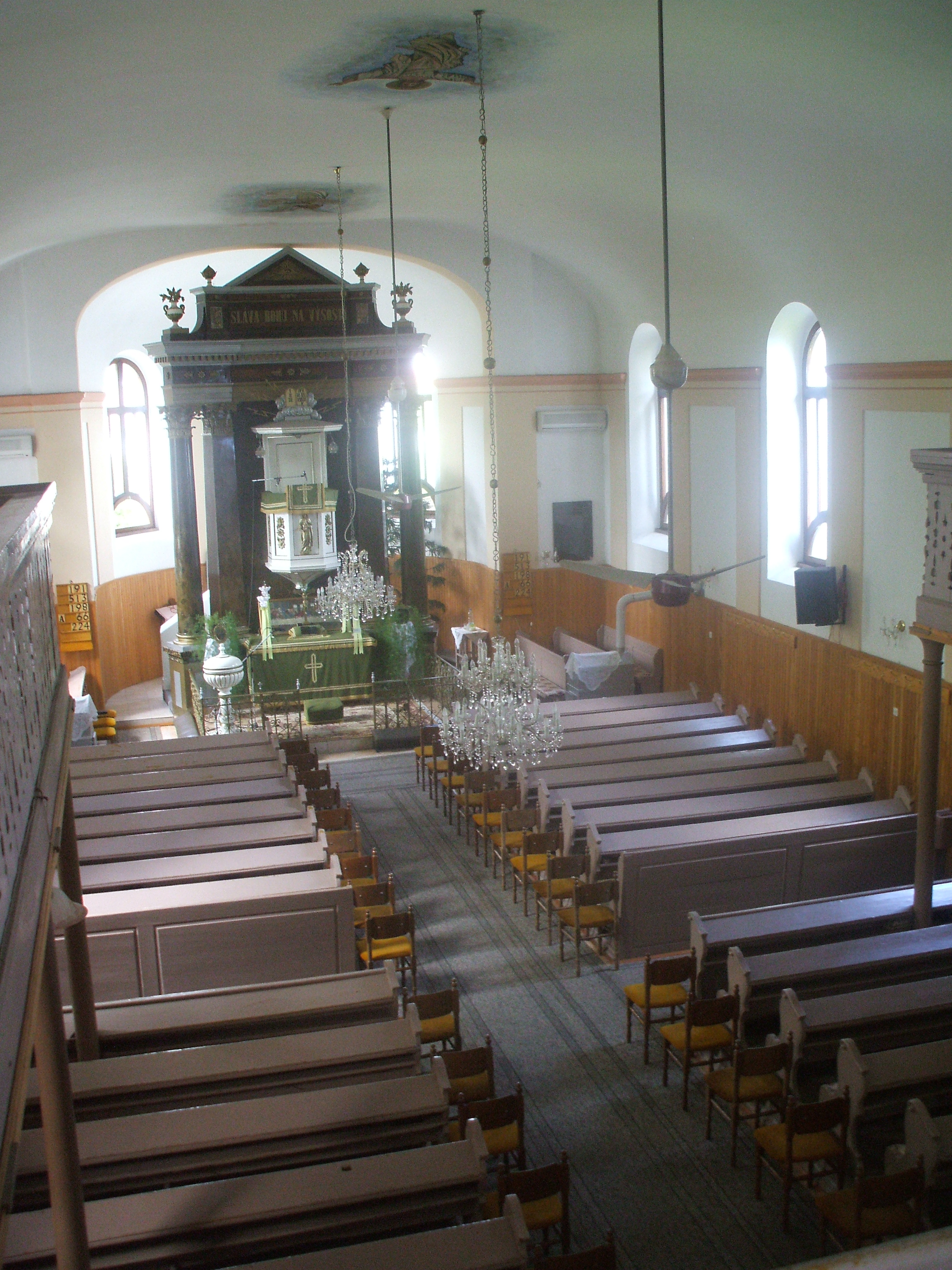
Interior

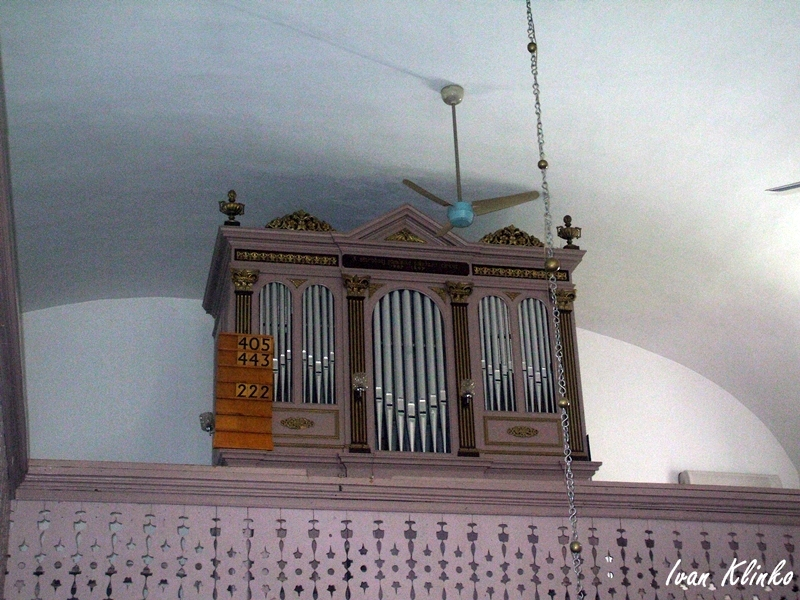
Church organ

Early in summer of the 1773, the first evangelist a.c. families settled in Kisač. They were bought by the Grof Andrej Hadík. In the same year, the first Slovak evangelist Juraj Vardžík from Piešťany stool came to Kisač. The founders of the congregation of the Slovak Evangelical Lutheran a.c. Church in Kisač originated from 10 counties and from 55 different villages. For the first 10 years, the Lutherans from Kisač baptized their little ones and married in the Catholic church in Futog.

When tolerance patent of Emperor Joseph II was issued, Bački Petrovac received the first priest, Andrej Stehlo, in August 1783. In 1785 Kisač's local administrator requested that settlement should have teacher, which was regulated on March 21, 1785. In 1787, local inhabitants requested a priest and an independent church, which was also regulated on December 22, 1787. The first service was on March 16, 1788 on Palm Sunday.

In 1795, the construction of the temple of God was started. During the celebration of the establishment of the temple of God, the priest was František Jesenský and Superintendent was Michal Sinovc.

In, 1797 the Church was a sacrificed.

In 1799, the church tower was completed.

In 1860, the second school was built.

In 1865, church members decided that temple should be increased.

The work was finished in 1866 and on November 11, the temple was consecrated by senior Gabriel Belohorsky.

In 1868, the tower was renovated.

In 1878, the third church school was built.

In 1885, the church bought an organ which was built by Karol Veselý.

In 1889, the fourth school was built.

In 1895, church purchased men's tavern, which became the fifth school.

In 1904, the sixth school was built. The first teacher was Samuel Záborsky (1785–1789).

In 1972, the Church-house was built (on November 5). Dedication carries bishop Dr. Juraj Struhárik.

In September 1998, the windows on the church were replaced.

In September 1999, the replacement of the church roof began.

On May 10, 2001, the repair of the church tower started.

=== List of priests ===
For last 200 years following priests served in the Church:

Priest	Years
Michal Slamay	1788–1794
František Jesenský	1794–1805
Michal Laukonides	1806–1827
Juraj Jesenský	1827–1864
Friedrich Steltzer	1865–1894
Karol Langhoffer	1894–1918
Pavel Turčan	1918–1961
Andrej Beredi (bishop)	1962–1983
Ján Valent (bishop)	1984–1996
Ondrej and Darina Marčok	1997 -

== See also ==
- Protestantism in Serbia
- Slovak Evangelical Church, Novi Sad
- Slovak Evangelical Church, Stara Pazova
- Slovak Evangelical Church, Šid
- Slovaks of Serbia
