= Slovak Evangelical Church, Novi Sad =

Coordinates: 45°15′26″N 19°50′29″E

Slovak Evangelical Church
- Slovenská evanjelická cirkva Словачка евангеличка црква
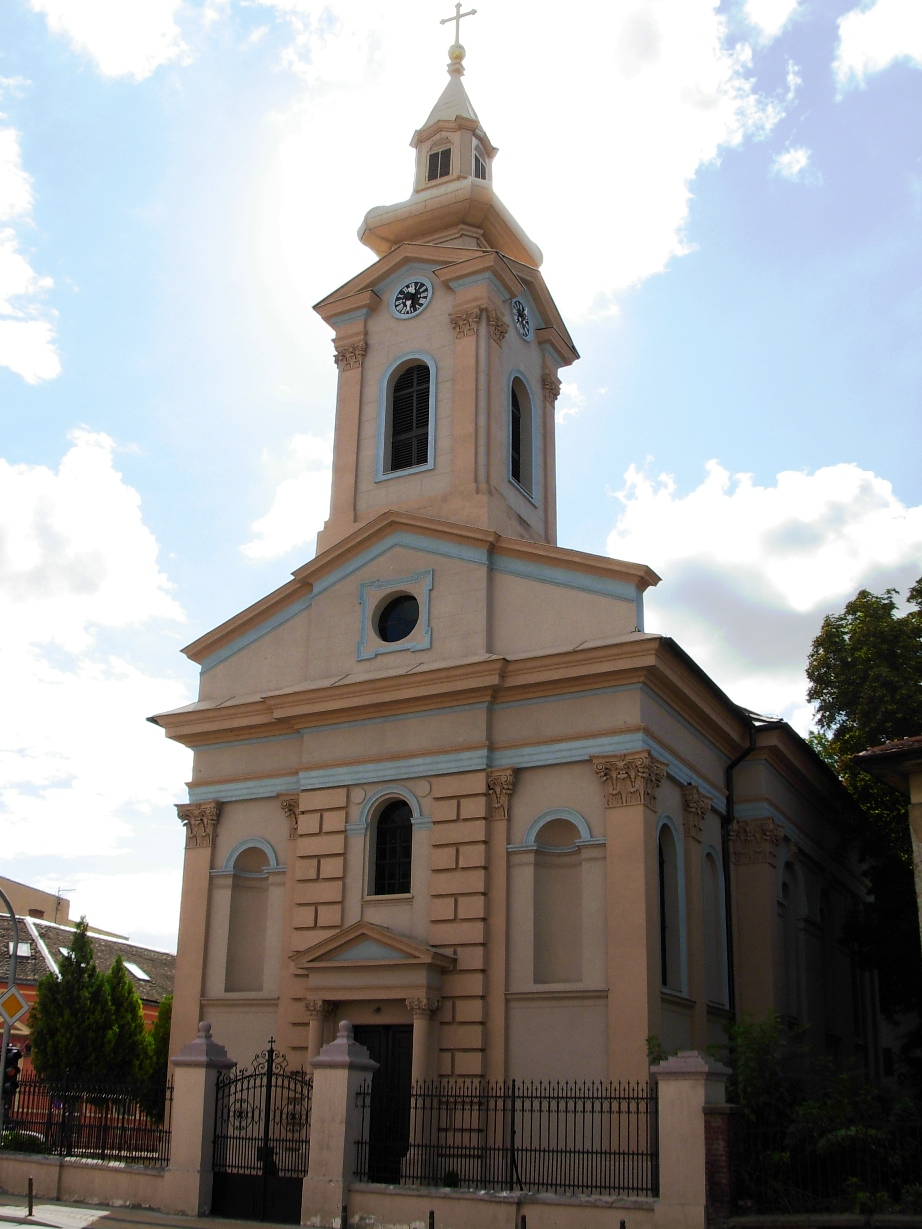
- Slovak Evangelical Church, pictured in 2010
- Slovak Evangelical Church
- Location: Novi Sad
- Country: Serbia
- Language: Slovak
- Denomination: Lutheranism

Architecture
- Functional status: active
- Groundbreaking: 1884
- Completed: 1886

The Slovak Evangelical Church in Novi Sad, Serbia, is a Lutheran church under jurisdiction of the Slovak Evangelical Church of the Augsburg Confession in Serbia, serving local ethnic Slovak community.

== History ==
In 1813, Slovaks constructed the first church along with a residence for the priest, a teacher's house, and a hall that functioned as a school on what is now Šafarikova Street. This church was destroyed during the confrontations linked with the Serb uprising of 1848–49. Construction of a new church commenced in 1884, and it was consecrated two years later. Since then, services have been held there continuously.

== Architecture ==
It was built in a baroque-neoclassical style under the patronage of Count Adolf Rajzer. The architectural style of the church is characterized by an eclectic combination of styles from the second half of the 19th century. Although the church suffered some damage during World War II, it has retained its original appearance.

== See also ==
- Protestantism in Serbia
- Slovak Evangelical Church, Stara Pazova
- Slovak Evangelical Church, Šid
- Slovak Evangelical Church, Kisač
- Slovaks in Serbia
