= Slovak Evangelical Church, Stara Pazova =

Coordinates: 44°59′03″N 20°09′32″E

Slovak Evangelical Church
- Slovenská evanjelická cirkva Словачка евангеличка црква
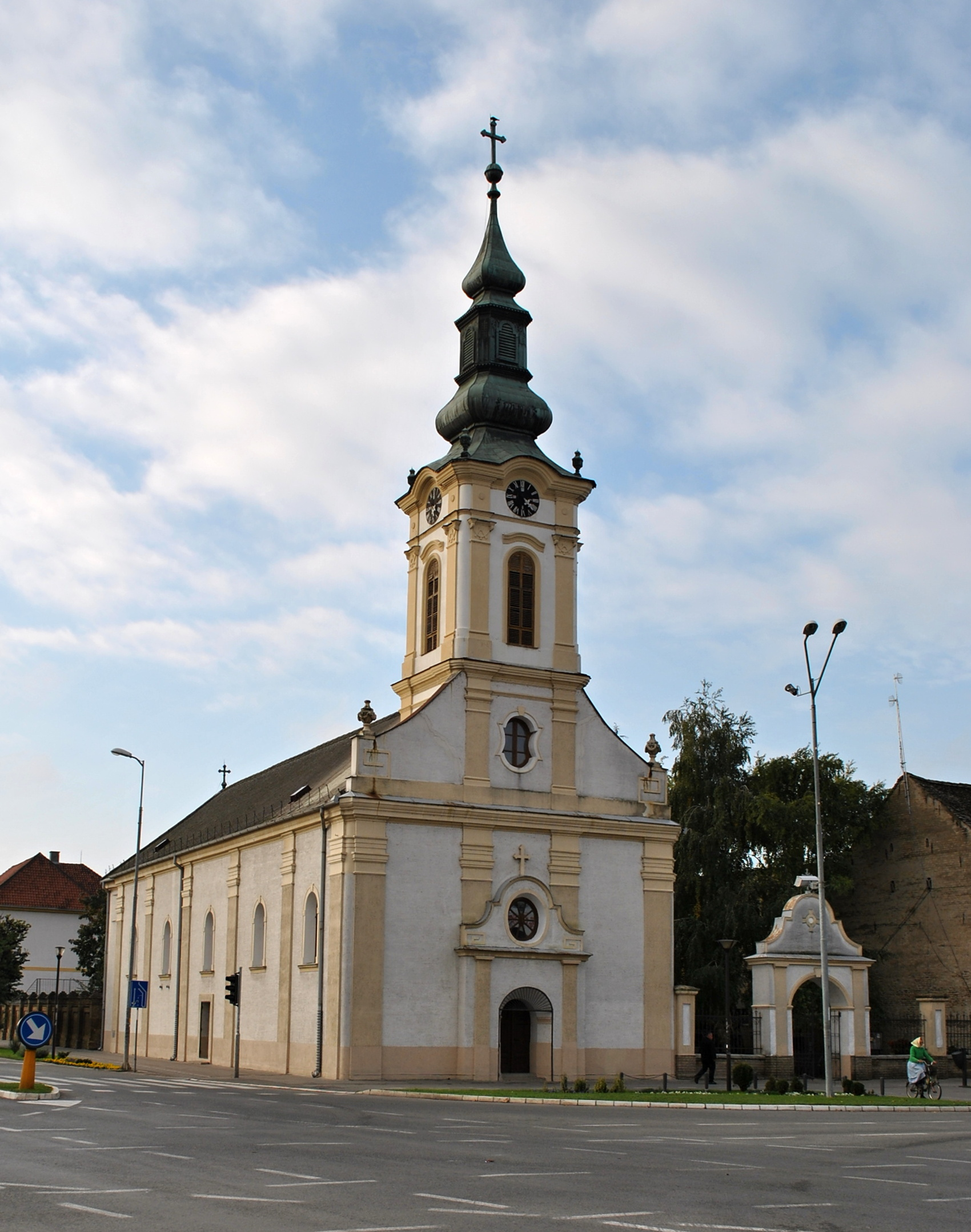
- Slovak Evangelical Church, pictured in 2010
- Slovak Evangelical Church
- Location: Stara Pazova
- Country: Serbia
- Language: Slovak
- Denomination: Lutheranism

Architecture
- Functional status: active
- Groundbreaking: 1786
- Completed: 1788

The Slovak Evangelical Church in Stara Pazova, Serbia, is a Lutheran church under jurisdiction of the Slovak Evangelical Church of the Augsburg Confession in Serbia, serving local ethnic Slovak community.

It was the first non-Catholic church in the Habsburg monarchy permitted to have a bell tower.

== History ==
Following the 1699 Treaty of Karlowitz which resulted in retreat of the Ottoman forces from southern Pannonian Basin including Syrmia, Serbs were the first to settle in the deserted area of Pazova within the area of the Slavonian Military Frontier. In 1770, the first Slovak settlers arrived from Selenča and Kiskőrös. Samuel Špannagel, the first Slovak pastor in Pazova, held the first public worship under the open sky in 1770. That same year, they built a prayer house, and in 1771, laid the foundation stone for the Slovak Evangelical Church. The church later became the oldest church of the Slovak Evangelical Church of the Augsburg Confession in Serbia. The first church was a modest building constructed from rammed earth, without a tower or bell. With the arrival of a second group of Slovak settlers, the initial church quickly became too small. On 31 August 1771, foundations were laid for a new, slightly larger church still without a tower. The bell hung on a separate wooden tripod outside the building.

After the 1781 Patent of Toleration by Emperor Joseph II, full religious freedom was granted. In 1784, there were 1,348 Slovak Evangelicals and 426 Orthodox Serbs in Pazova. In 1785, teacher Michal Slamaj became pastor, and plans were made for the construction of a new bell tower.' Since the existing adobe structure could not support a tower, a new church was erected between 1786 and 1788, built from fired brick. Despite the restrictions imposed by the Patent of Toleration, which prohibited non-Catholic communities from building bell towers, the congregation sought imperial permission for a new church with a proper tower. Their petition reached Emperor Joseph II, who overruled the objections of the court council and granted them a special exemption, allowing the construction of the bell tower. In the spring of 1793, following a harsh winter, the church building collapsed due to moisture damage. The congregation requested permission to rebuild, which was granted.

The church acquired its first organ in 1789. The current organ, made by Ország Sándor, was brought from Pest in 1868. During World War I, the Hungarian military authorities requisitioned the three largest bells. In 1921, the church hosted a gathering of representatives of Slovak Evangelical parishes, aiming to found the Slovak Evangelical Church of the Augsburg Confession in the Kingdom of Yugoslavia. In 1991, the church was designated a cultural monument of great importance.

== See also ==
- Protestantism in Serbia
- Slovak Evangelical Church, Novi Sad
- Slovak Evangelical Church, Šid
- Slovak Evangelical Church, Kisač
- Slovaks of Serbia
