= Union of Baptist Churches in Serbia =

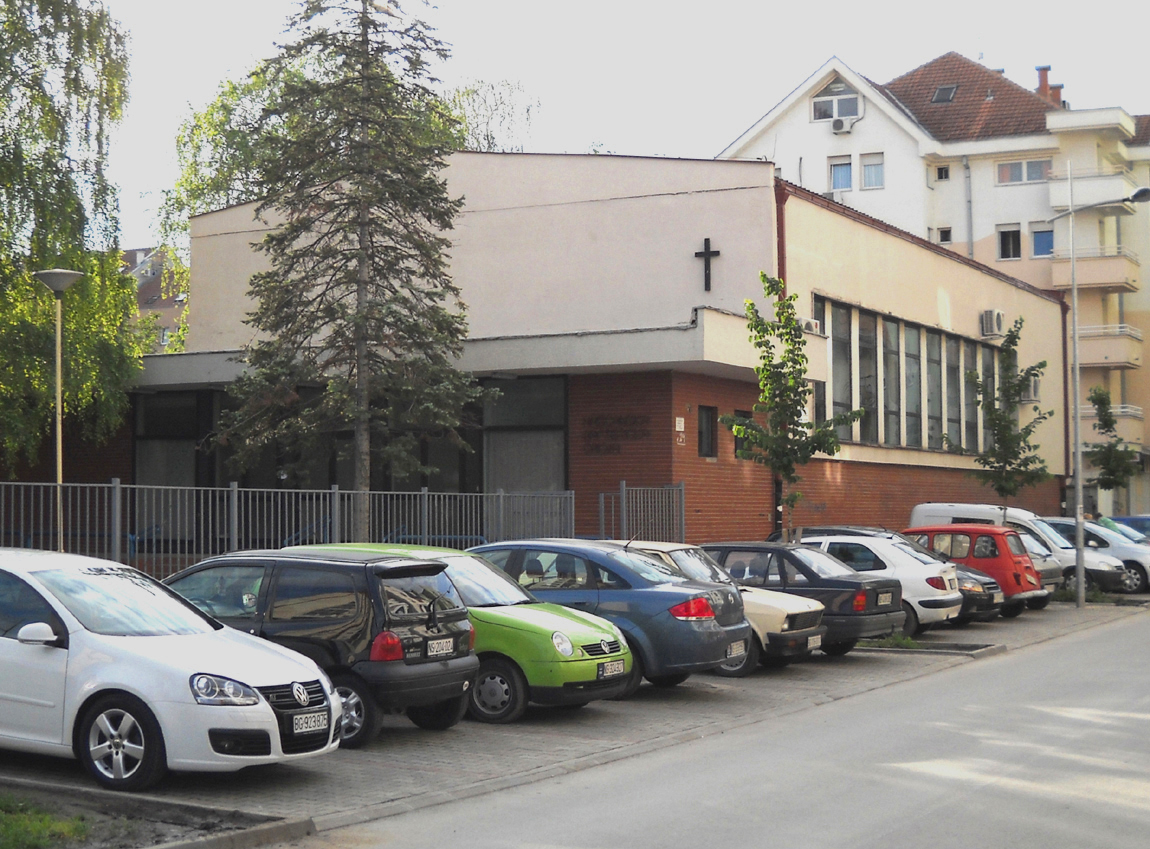
Christian Baptist Church in Novi Sad

The Union of Baptist Churches in Serbia (Serbian: Савез баптистичких цркава у Србији, romanized: Savez baptističkih crkava u Srbiji) is a Baptist Christian denomination in Serbia, member of the European Baptist Federation and the Baptist World Alliance. The headquarters is in Belgrade. According to a census published by the association in 2023, it claimed 41 churches and 910 members.

== History ==
The union has its origins in the establishment of the first Baptist Church in Novi Sad by a German mission led by Heinrich Meyer in 1875. Work began among the Hungarians in 1899, Slovaks in 1900, Romanians in 1922, and Serbs in 1925. The German Baptists formed an association that continued to 1944. After Yugoslavia was established in 1918, Baptists formed a union in 1924. The union ended during World War II but was reorganized after the war. This union ceased to exist in 1991, and the Baptist Union of Serbia was founded in 1992, then changed its name to Baptist Union of Yugoslavia but has since been returned to the current name.

== See also ==
- Union of Christian Baptist Churches in Serbia
- Protestantism in Serbia
