= Slovak Evangelical Church of the Augsburg Confession in Serbia =

Lutheran church in Serbia

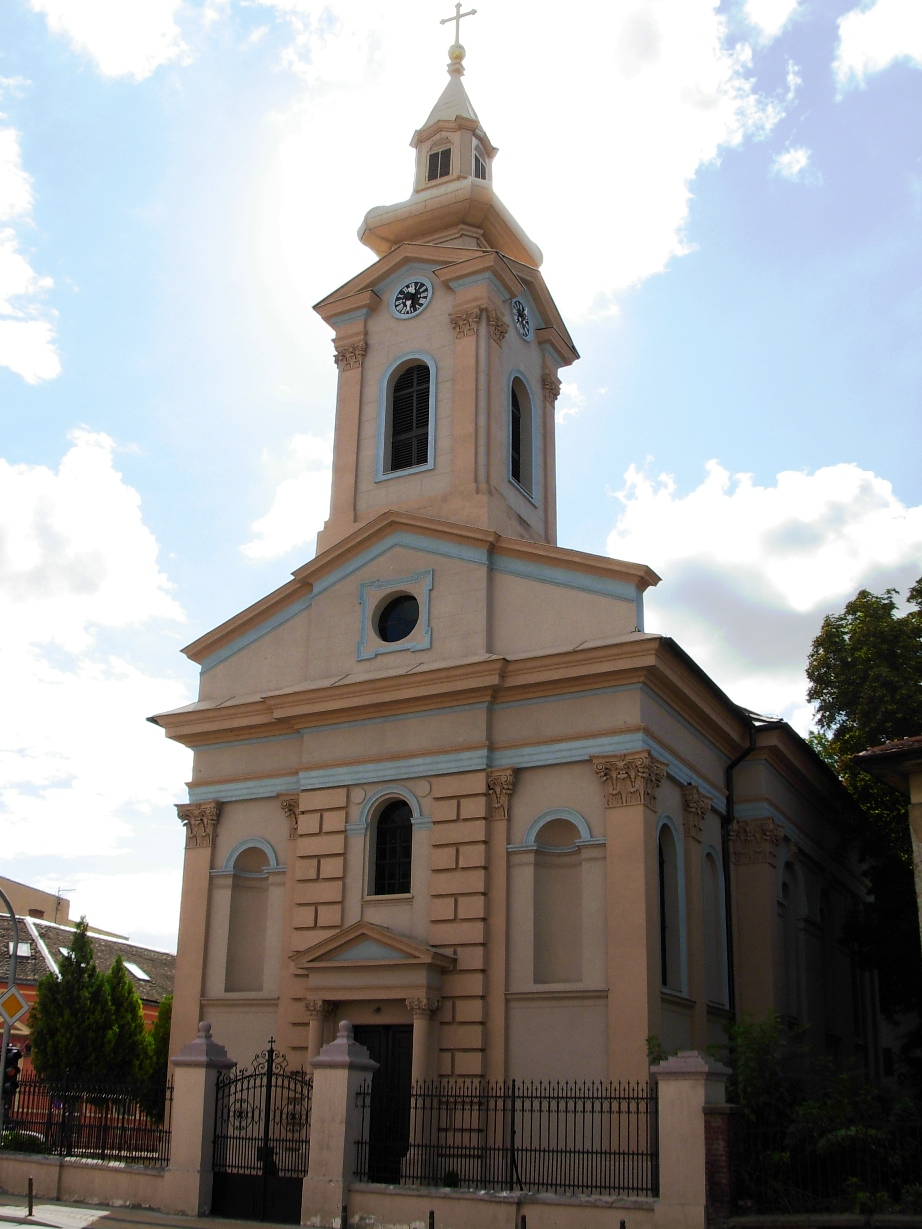
- Slovak Evangelical Church in Novi Sad
- Classification: Protestant
- Orientation: Lutheranism
- Polity: Episcopal
- Bishop: Jaroslav Javorník
- Associations: Lutheran World Federation
- Region: Serbia, Bosnia and Herzegovina
- Language: Slovak
- Branched from: Evangelical-Lutheran Church in Hungary
- Congregations: 27
- Members: 35,000
- Publications: Evanjelický hlásnik
- Official website: seavc.rs

The Slovak Evangelical Church of the Augsburg Confession in Serbia (Slovak: Slovenská evanjelická augsburského vyznania cirkev v Srbsku; Serbian: Словачка евангеличка црква аугзбуршке вероисповести у Србији / Slovačka evangelička crkva augsburške veroispovesti) is a Lutheran church in Serbia. It has nearly 35,000 members, the vast majority of whom are ethnic Slovaks with services held in the Slovak language.

== History ==
The history of Lutheranism in thie territory of present-day Serbia begins in the first half of the 18th century, when evangelical Slovaks from the area around the Tatra Mountains in the former Upper Hungary left their homeland and settled on the southern border of the Habsburg monarchy, in hope of being less exposed to the pressure of the Counter-Reformation there. Their first arrival was, according to some sources, in 1720 and according to the other in 1745. Additional migrations happened during the early 19th century. Immediately after arrival, Slovak also organized themselves ecclesiastically, especially after the adoption of the Patent of Toleration in 1781.

In the 18th century, Hungarian and German Lutherans also began to settle in the fertile areas of the Danube. All of them, together with the Slovak Lutherans, were under the jurisdiction of the Evangelical-Lutheran Church in Hungary until the break up of the Austria-Hungary empire at the end of World War I.

The Slovak Evangelical Church of the Augsburg Confession in the Kingdom of Serbs, Croats, and Slovenes was founded in 1921 by the session of the synod in Stara Pazova by Slovak Christians who had previously belonged to the Evangelical-Lutheran Church of Hungary and whose settlements had become part of the newly established Yugoslavia following the dissolution of Austria-Hungary after World War I. The first Bishop was Adam Vereš.

In 2007, the German Evangelical Church of the Augsburg Confession in Serbia was re-established in Zemun, Belgrade. In 2009 church was affiliated to the Slovak Evangelical Church of the A.C. in Serbia.

== Organization ==
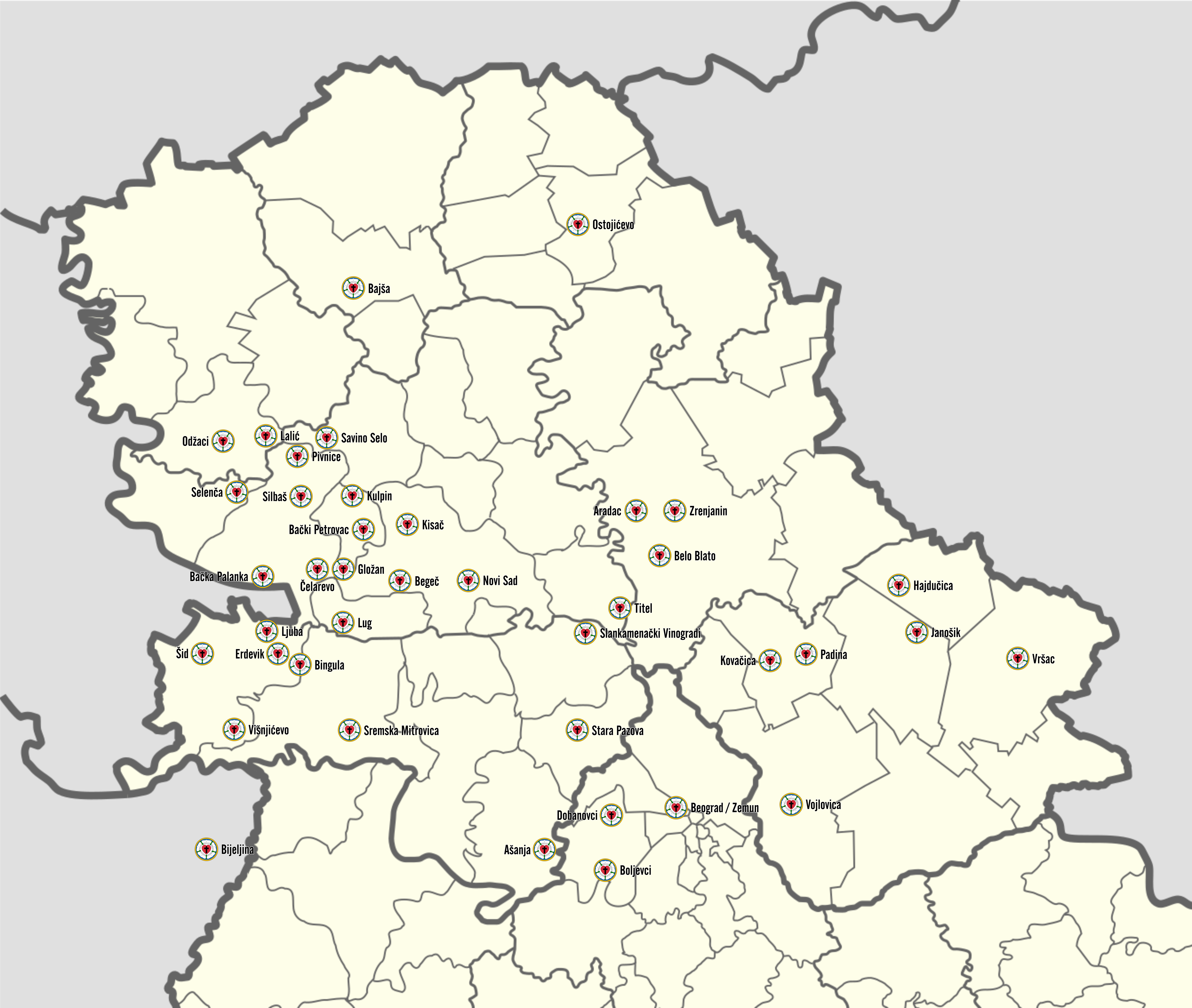
Map of parishes

The church is organized into four dioceses (deaneries): Báčsky (Bačka), Banátsky (Banat), Sriemsky (Syrmia), and German Seniorate, each headed and administered by a senior dean. It has 27 congregations and 14 branches (daughter communities), mostly concentrated in Vojvodina. Currently there are 20 pastors, among them four women, as well as four senior deans, all headed and administered by the bishop (currently Jaroslav Javorník, elected in 2020). The highest administrative and legislative authority is the synod, which meets annually.

Theological education of pastors is provided at the Evangelical Lutheran Theological Faculty of the Comenius University in Bratislava, Slovakia, which also trains seminary students of the Evangelical Church of the Augsburg Confession in Slovakia.

Outside of Serbia, the church has a single parish in Bosnia and Herzegovina, located in the town of Bijeljina.

== Relations with other churches and organizations ==
The Slovak Evangelical Church of the Augsburg Confession in Serbia maintains partnerships with the Evangelical Church of the Augsburg Confession in Slovakia, the Evangelical Church of the Augsburg Confession in Slovenia, the Evangelical Church in Germany, and the Evangelical Lutheran Church in America.

The church is also a member of the World Council of Churches (since 1963), the Conference of European Churches, the Lutheran World Federation (since 1952), and the Community of Protestant Churches in Europe. It is also a partner church of the Gustav-Adolf-Werk.

== Publishing and media ==
The church publishes approximately 2,650 copies of its monthly magazine Evanjelický hlásnik (Evangelical Messenger), 1,500 copies of its yearbook Ročenka, as well 17,000 copies of its calendar Evanjelický kalendár (Evangelical Calendar). On Radio Television of Vojvodina it has a radio show "Pohľady k výšinám" (Visions to the Heights), which is broadcast once a week.

== Gallery ==
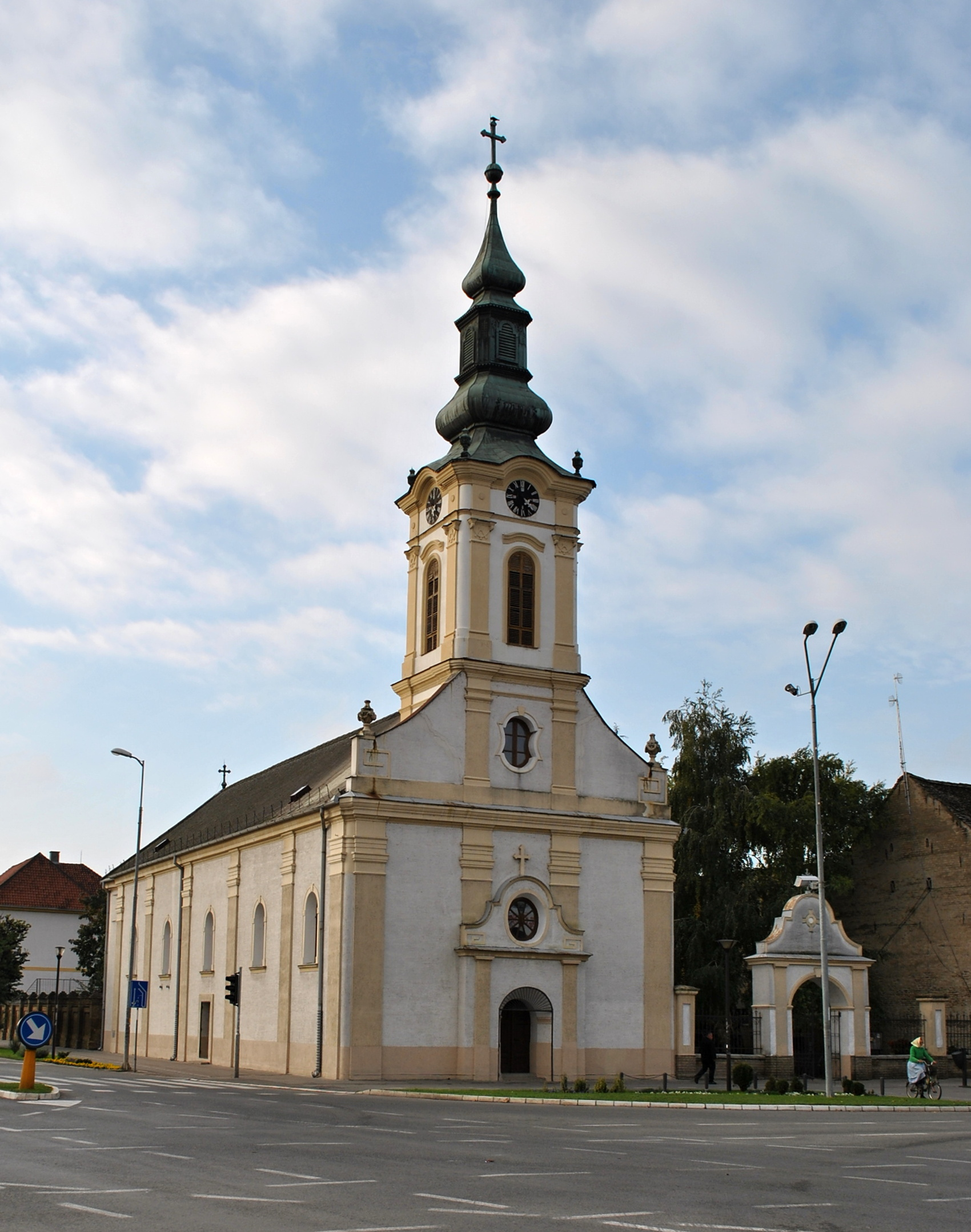
Church in Stara Pazova

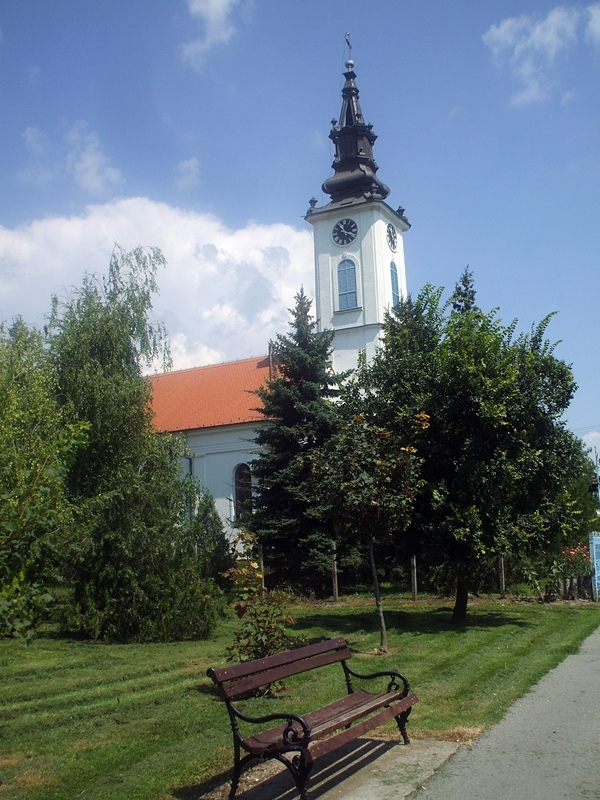
Church in Kisač

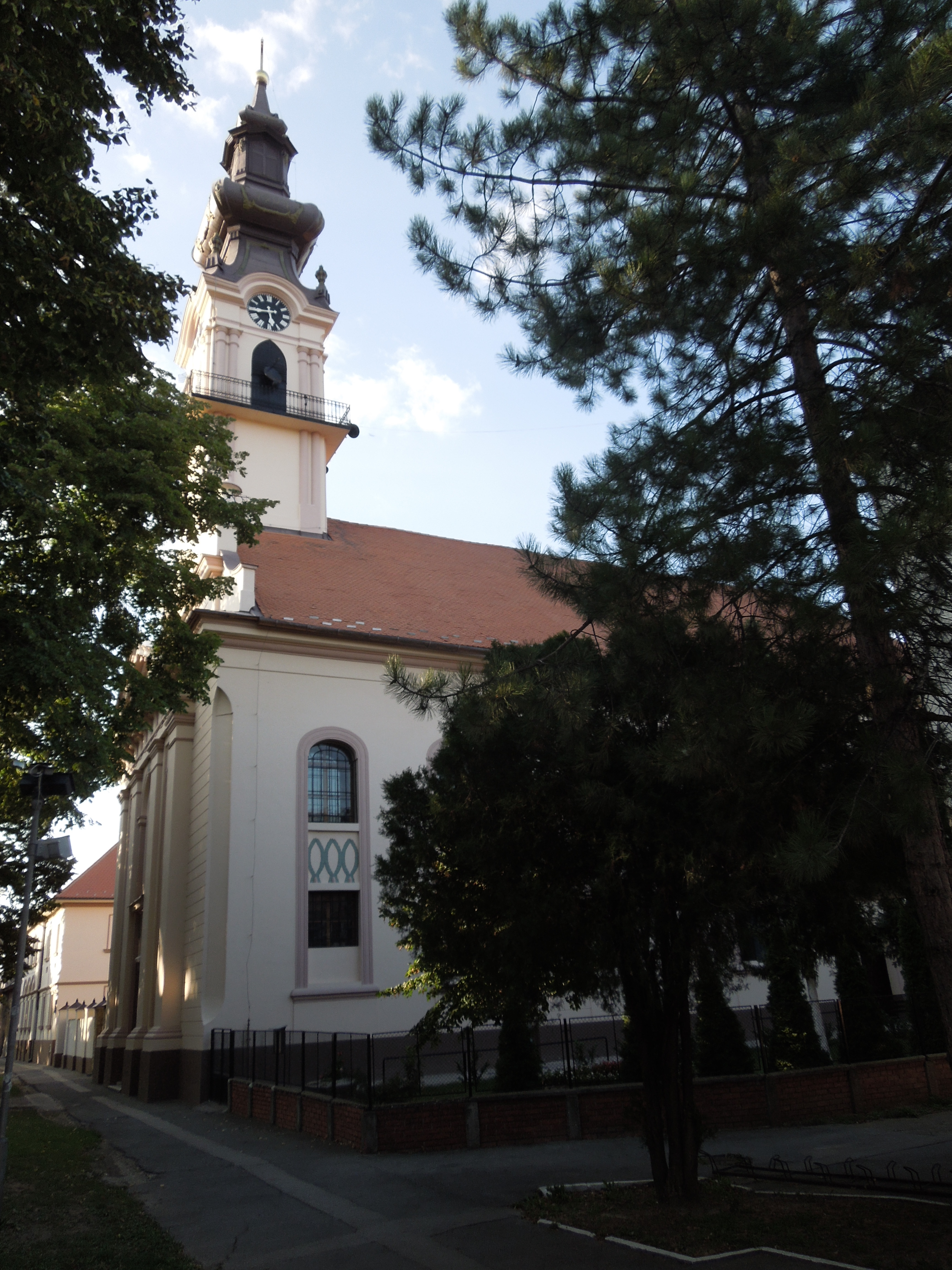
Church in Bački Petrovac

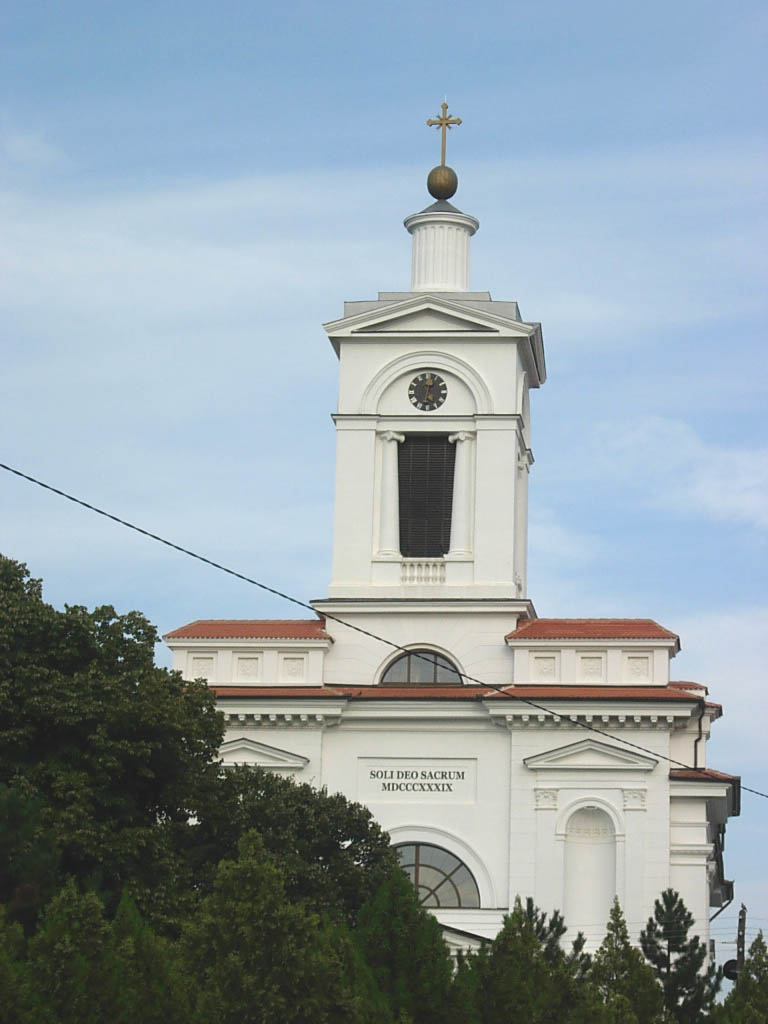
Church in Padina
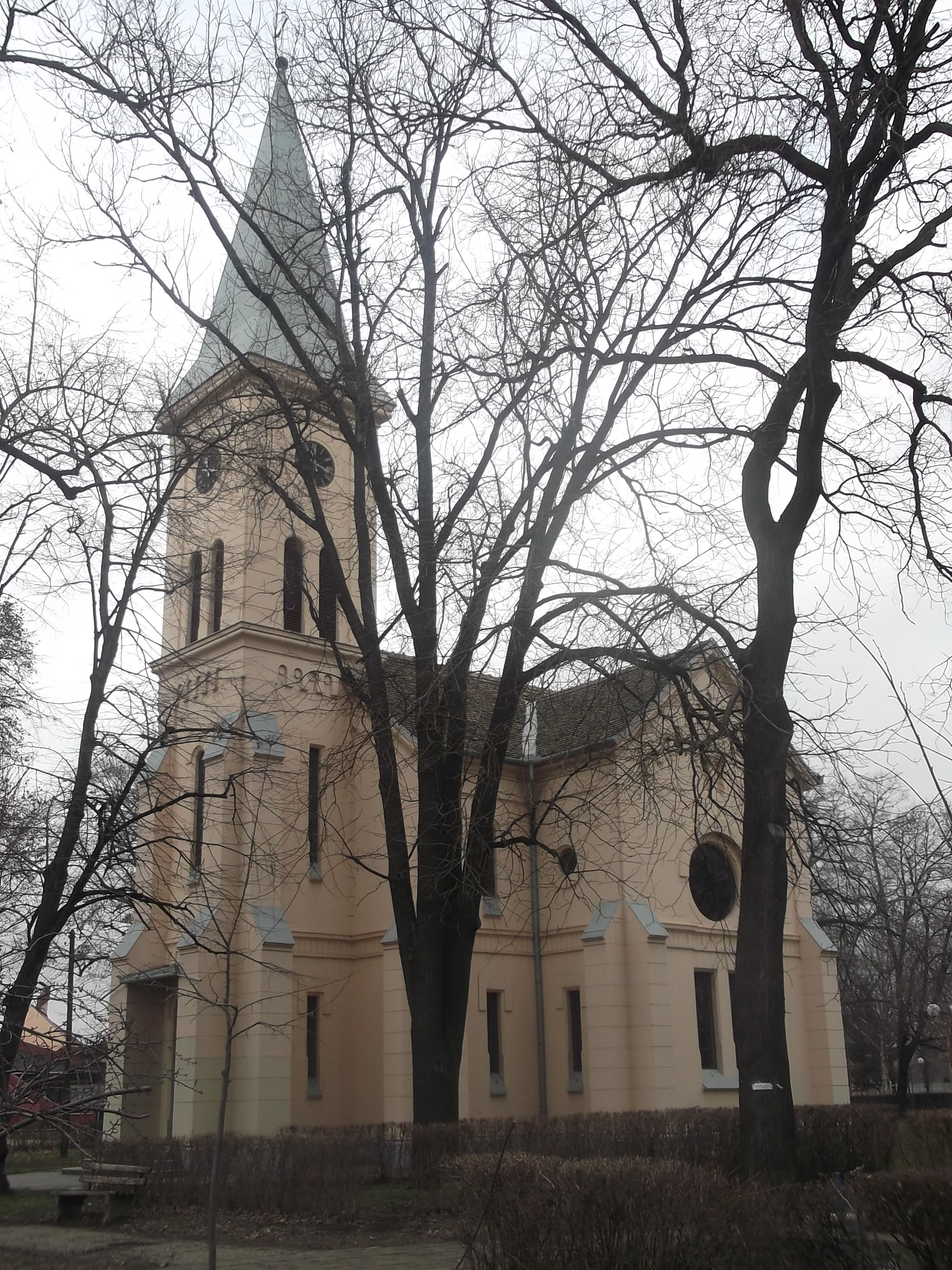
Church in Pančevo

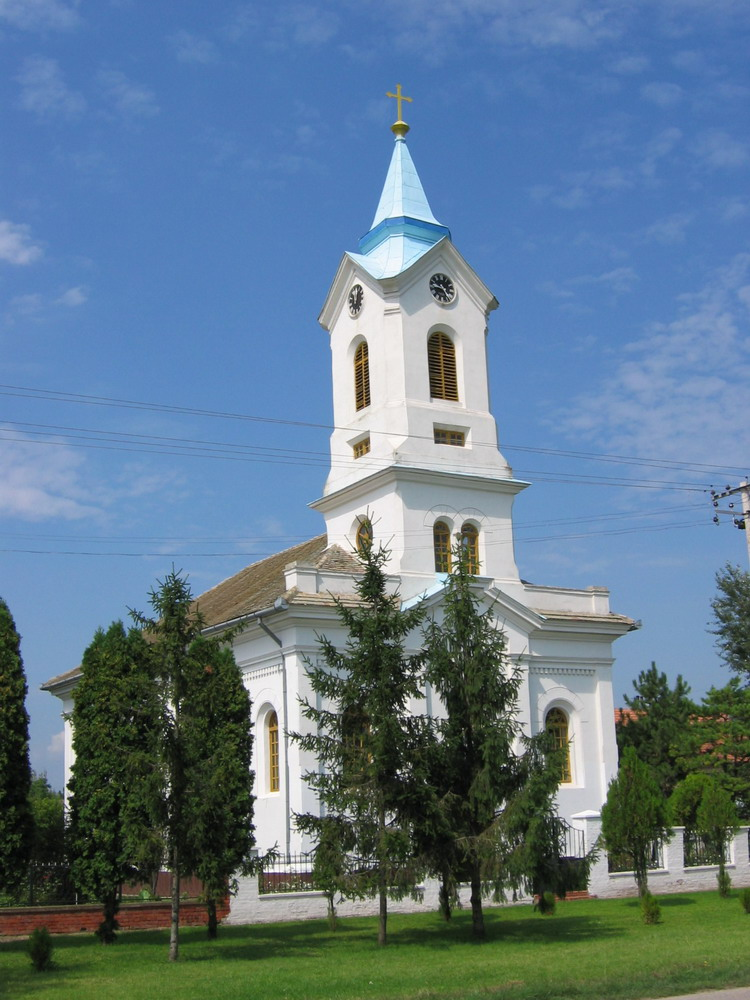
Church in Janošik

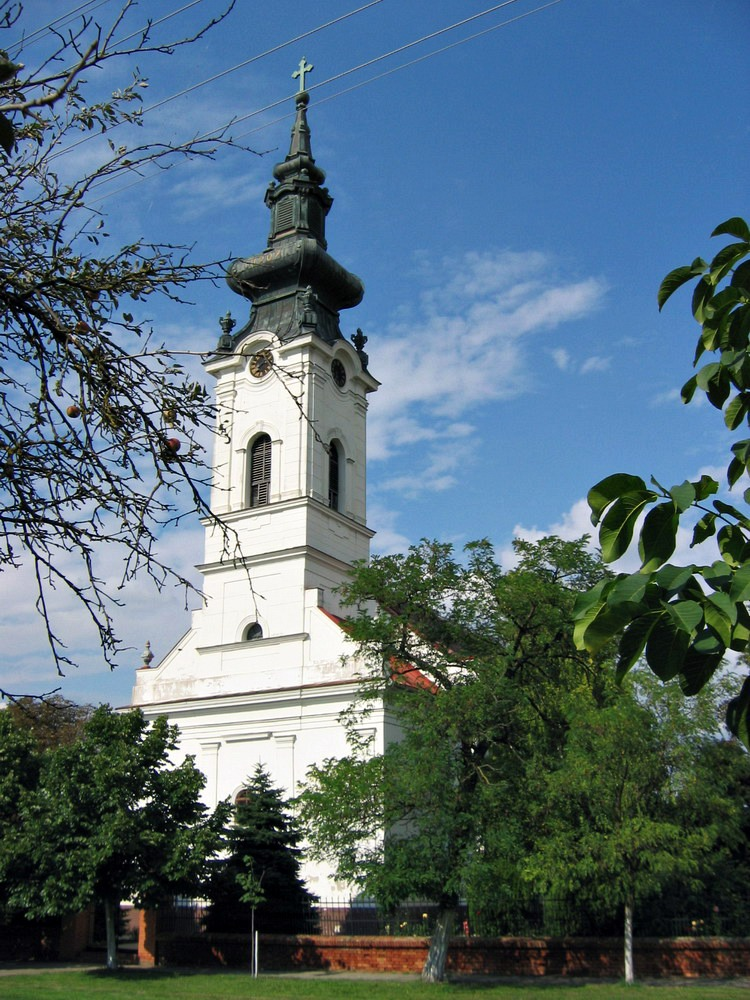
Church in Aradac

== See also ==
- Protestantism in Serbia
- Slovaks in Serbia

== Literature ==
- Ročenka Slovenskej evanjelickej a. v. cirkvi v Srbsku 2009, 2011, 2018, Novi Sad, ISSN 1820-7707
- Svetlana Vojnićová Feldyová: Slovenská evanjelická augsburského vyznania cirkev v Srbsku v slove an obrazoch: odkaz minulosti pre budúcnosť evanjelických Slovákov, 2017, Novi Sad, ISBN 978-86-918373-0-3
