= Union of Christian Baptist Churches in Serbia =

The Union of Christian Baptist Churches in Serbia (Serbian: Савез хришћанских баптистичких цркава у Србији, romanized: Savez hrišćanskih baptističkih crkava u Srbiji) is a Baptist denomination in Serbia. It is a member of the European Baptist Federation and the Baptist World Alliance. The headquarters is in Vrnjačka Banja. According to a census published by the association in 2023, it claimed 16 churches and 343 members.

== See also ==
- Union of Baptist Churches in Serbia
- Protestantism in Serbia
