= Stara Pazova =

Stara Pazova Стара Пазова (Serbian) Stará Pazova (Slovak)
- Town and municipality
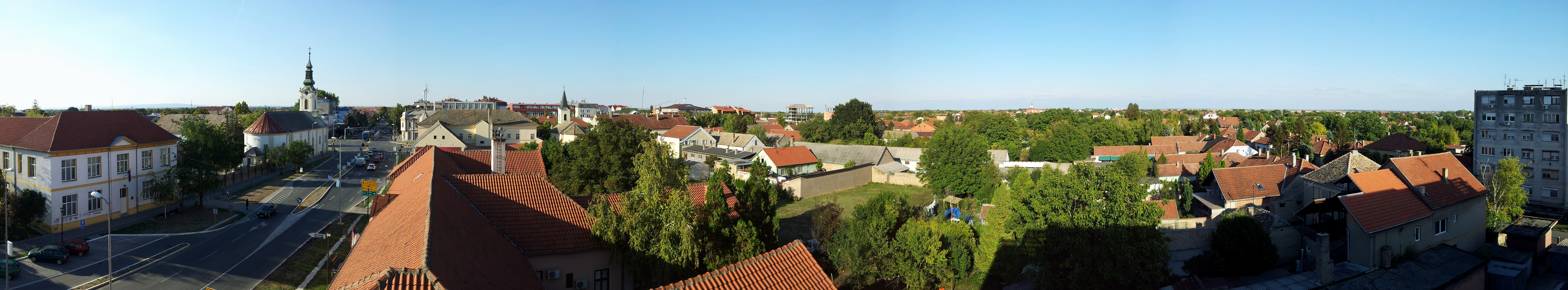
- Panorama of Stara Pazova town

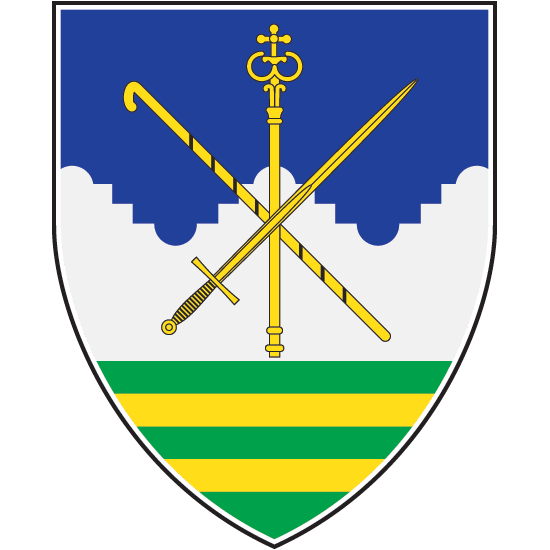
- Coat of arms

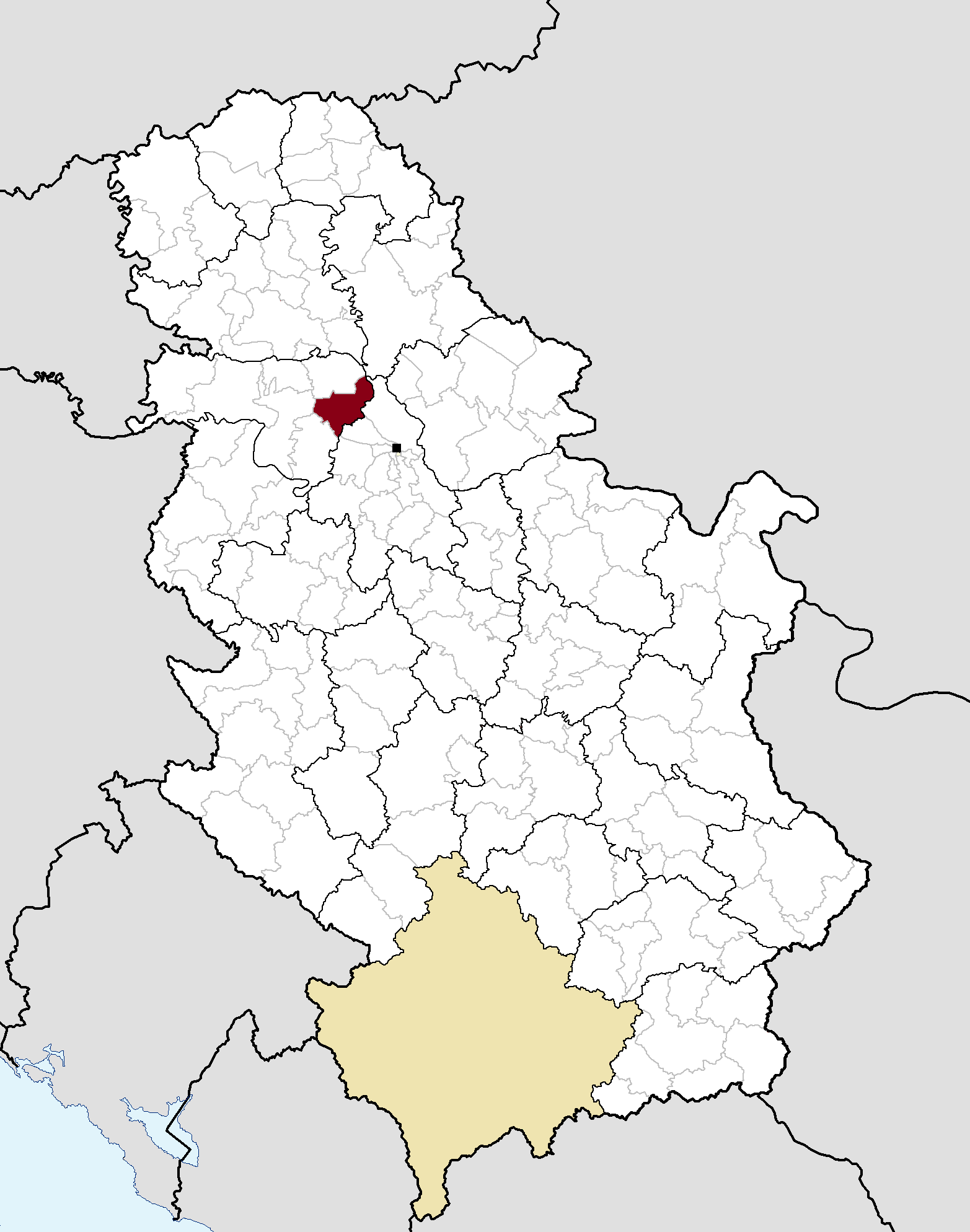
- Location of the municipality of Stara Pazova within Serbia
- Coordinates: 44°59′N 20°10′E
- Country: Serbia
- Province: Vojvodina
- Region: Syrmia
- District: Srem
- Municipality: Stara Pazova
- Settlements: 9

Government
  - Mayor: Đorđe Radinović (SNS)

Area
  - Town: 64.73 km^{2} (24.99 sq mi)
  - Municipality: 344.49 km^{2} (133.01 sq mi)
- Elevation: 82 m (269 ft)

Population (2022 census)
  - Town: 18,522
  - Town density: 286.1/km^{2} (741.1/sq mi)
  - Municipality: 62,318
  - Municipality density: 180.90/km^{2} (468.53/sq mi)
- Time zone: UTC+1 (CET)
  - Summer (DST): UTC+2 (CEST)
- Postal code: 22300
- Area code: +381(0)22
- Car plates: ST
- Official languages: Serbian throughout the municipality together with Slovak in the settlement of Stara Pazova itself

Stara Pazova (Serbian Cyrillic: Стара Пазова, pronounced [stâːraː pâzɔv̞a]; Slovak: Stará Pazova; Hungarian: Ópazova) is a small town located in the Srem District of the Autonomous Province of Vojvodina, Serbia. The town has a population of 18,522, while Stara Pazova municipality has 62,318 inhabitants (2022 census). The entrance into town from Inđija lies on the 45th parallel north, it is half-way between the North Pole and the equator.

== Name ==
In Serbian, the town is known as Stara Pazova (Стара Пазова), formerly also Pazova (Пазова); in Slovak as Stará Pazova; in German as Alt-Pasua, Alt-Pazua or Pazua; and in Hungarian as Ópazova.

== History ==
During the Ottoman administration (16th-18th century), Pazova was populated by ethnic Serbs and was part of the Ottoman Sanjak of Syrmia. In 1718, the town became part of the Habsburg monarchy. In the 18th century (after 1760) Lutheran Slovaks settled in Pazova, and in 1791 Germans arrived here as well. The Germans lived in a separate settlement known as Nova Pazova ("New Pazova"), thus the old settlement was named Stara Pazova ("Old Pazova"). Until the second half of the 20th century, Slovaks were the largest ethnic group in the town of Stara Pazova, while the largest ethnic group in the surrounding municipality were Serbs.

For most part of the Habsburg rule, Stara Pazova was part of the Habsburg Military Frontier (abolished in 1882), while in 1848–1849 it was part of Serbian Vojvodina. In the late 19th and early 20th century, Stara Pazova was a district centre in the Syrmia County (part of the Kingdom of Croatia-Slavonia, Kingdom of Hungary and Austria-Hungary). According to the 1910 census, the population of the Stara Pazova municipality numbered 46,430 inhabitants, of whom 24,262 spoke Serbian, 9,348 German, 5,779 Slovak, and 5,670 Croatian. The town itself had a Slovak majority in 1910.

After 1918, the town was part of the Kingdom of Serbs, Croats and Slovenes and subsequent South Slavic states.

== Inhabited places ==
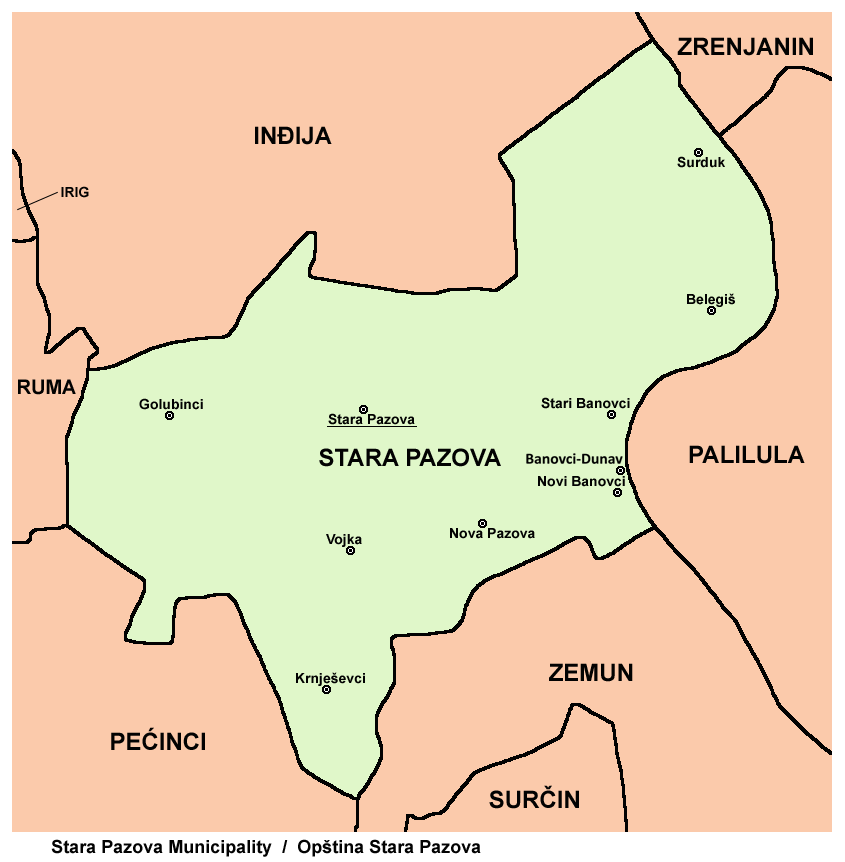
Map of Stara Pazova municipality

Stara Pazova municipality includes the town of Stara Pazova and the following settlements:

- Belegiš
- Vojka
- Golubinci
- Krnješevci
- Nova Pazova
- Novi Banovci
- Stari Banovci
- Surduk

== Demographics ==
Historical population
Year	Pop.	±% p.a.
1948	30,547	—
1953	33,352	+1.77%
1961	41,036	+2.63%
1971	43,447	+0.57%
1981	52,566	+1.92%
1991	57,291	+0.86%
2002	67,576	+1.51%
2011	65,792	−0.30%
2022	62,318	−0.49%

According to the 2011 census results, the municipality of Stara Pazova had a population of 65,792 inhabitants.

=== Ethnic groups ===
All settlements in the municipality have an ethnic Serb majority. The ethnic composition of the municipality:

Ethnic group	Population	%
Serbs	54,516	82.86%
Slovaks	5,212	7.92%
Croats	1,336	2.03%
Romani	1,193	1.81%
Yugoslavs	206	0.31%
Montenegrins	122	0.19%
Macedonians	179	0.27%
Hungarians	131	0.20%
Muslims	83	0.13%
Russians	52	0.08%
Ukrainians	47	0.07%
Slovenes	27	0.04%
Germans	27	0.04%
Gorani	21	0.03%
Bosniaks	17	0.03%
Bulgarians	12	0.02%
Others	2,611	3.97%
Total	65,792	

== Economy ==
The following table gives a preview of total number of registered people employed in legal entities per their core activity (as of 2018):

Activity	Total
Agriculture, forestry and fishing	297
Mining and quarrying	13
Manufacturing	7,474
Electricity, gas, steam and air conditioning supply	94
Water supply; sewerage, waste management and remediation activities	281
Construction	939
Wholesale and retail trade, repair of motor vehicles and motorcycles	5,548
Transportation and storage	2,311
Accommodation and food services	593
Information and communication	165
Financial and insurance activities	145
Real estate activities	63
Professional, scientific and technical activities	548
Administrative and support service activities	1,325
Public administration and defense; compulsory social security	583
Education	796
Human health and social work activities	811
Arts, entertainment and recreation	238
Other service activities	320
Individual agricultural workers	404
Total	22,950

== Gallery ==
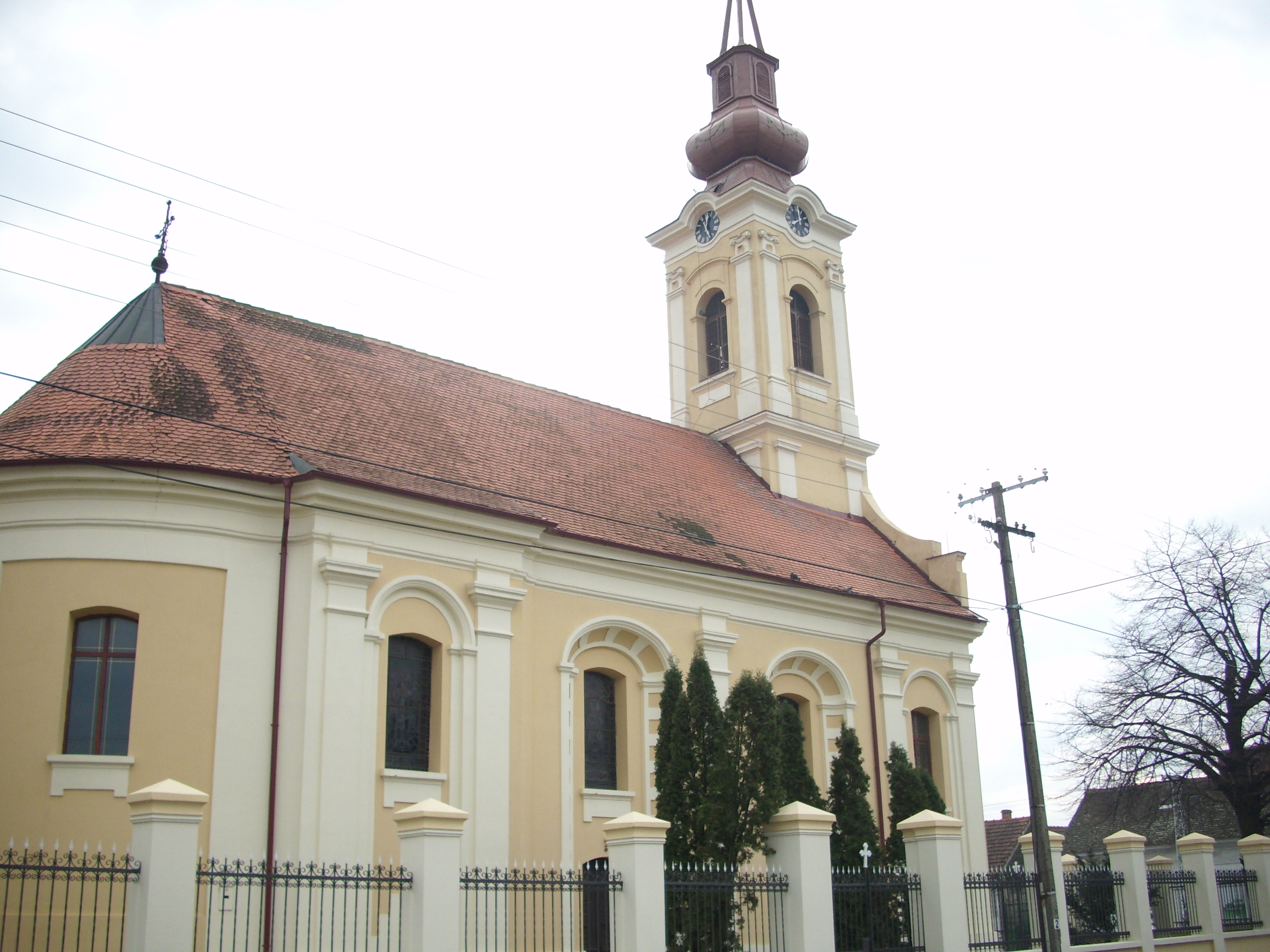
The Serbian Orthodox church.

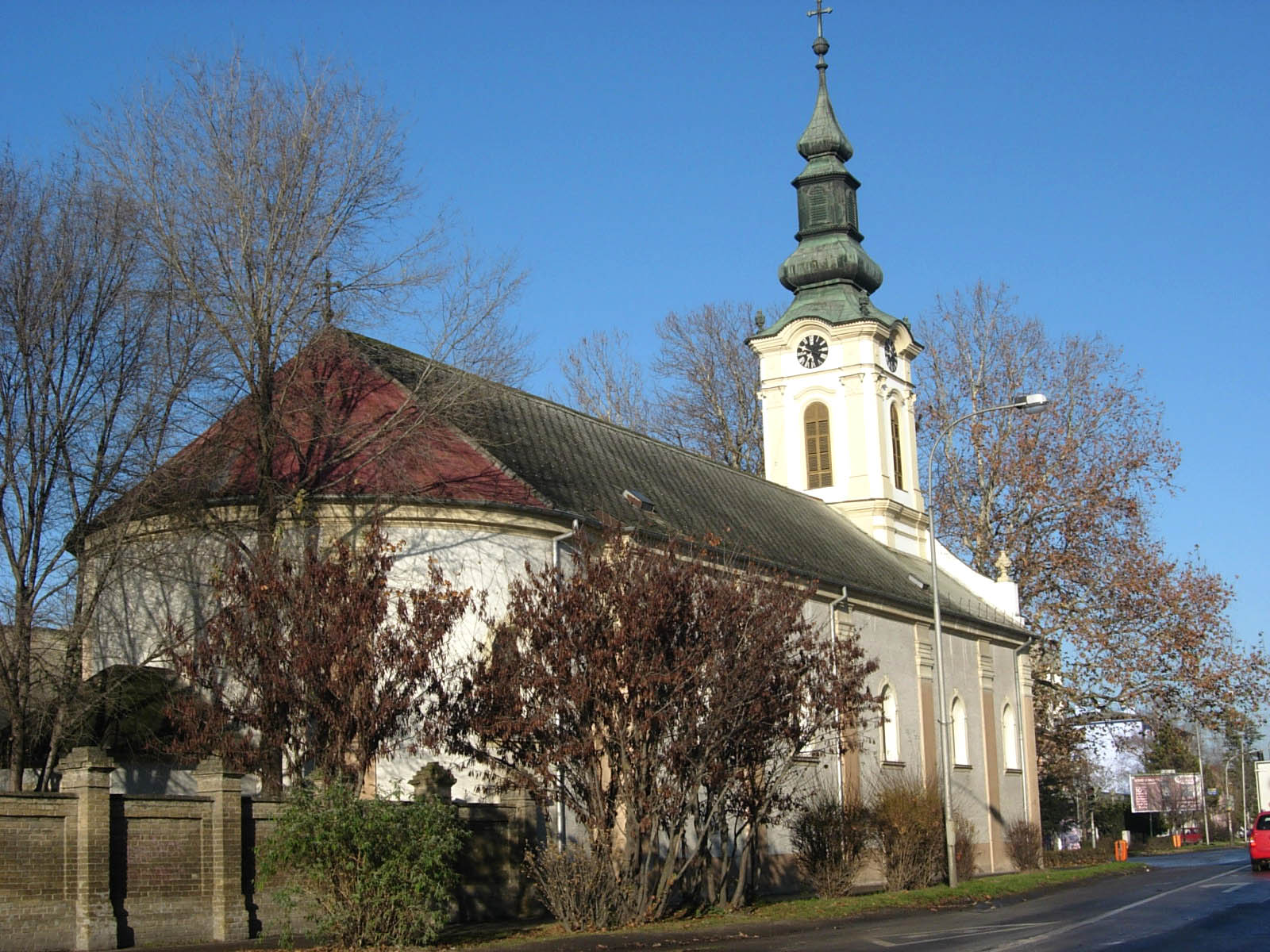
Slovak Evangelical Church, Stara Pazova.

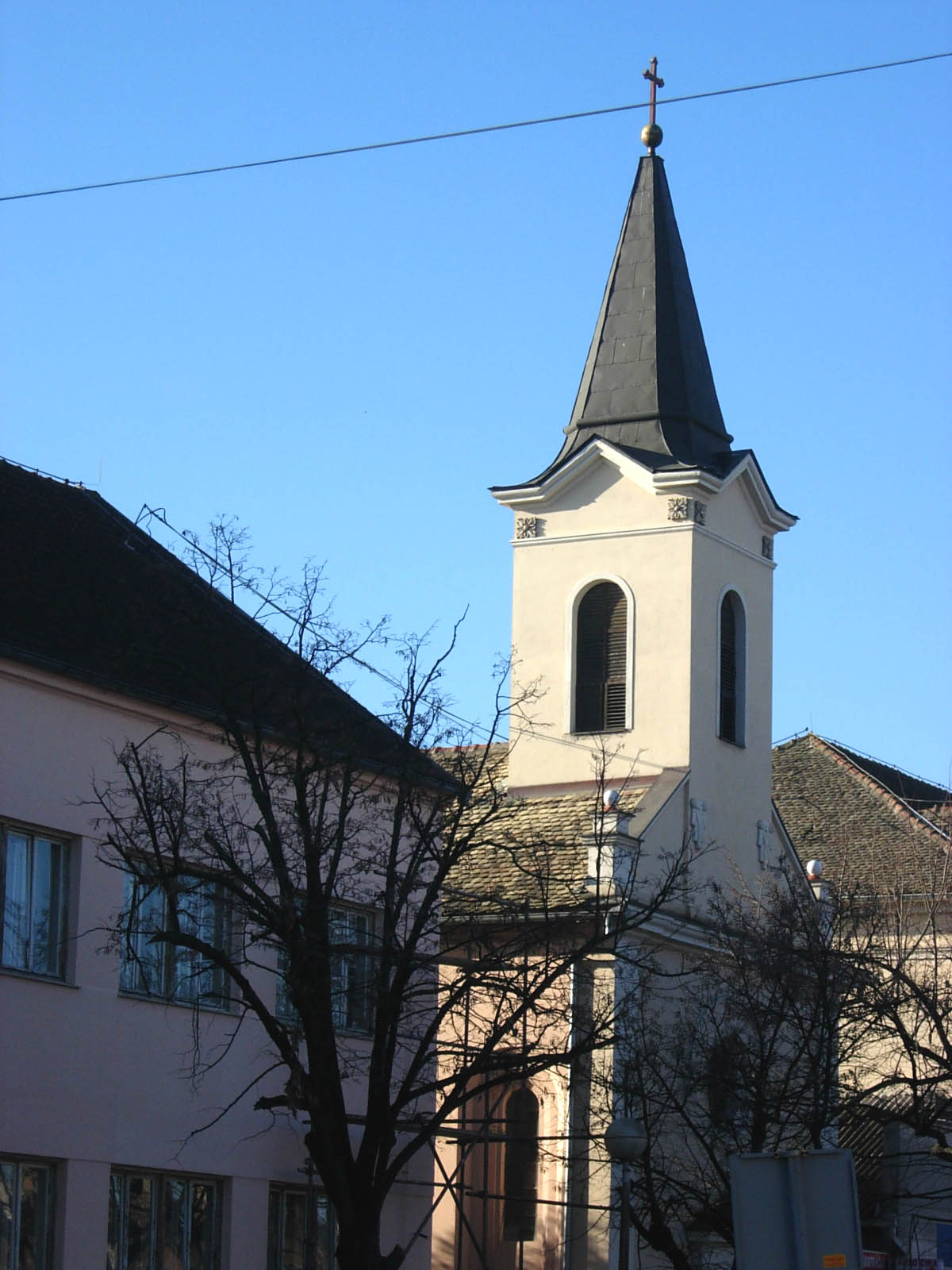
The Catholic church.

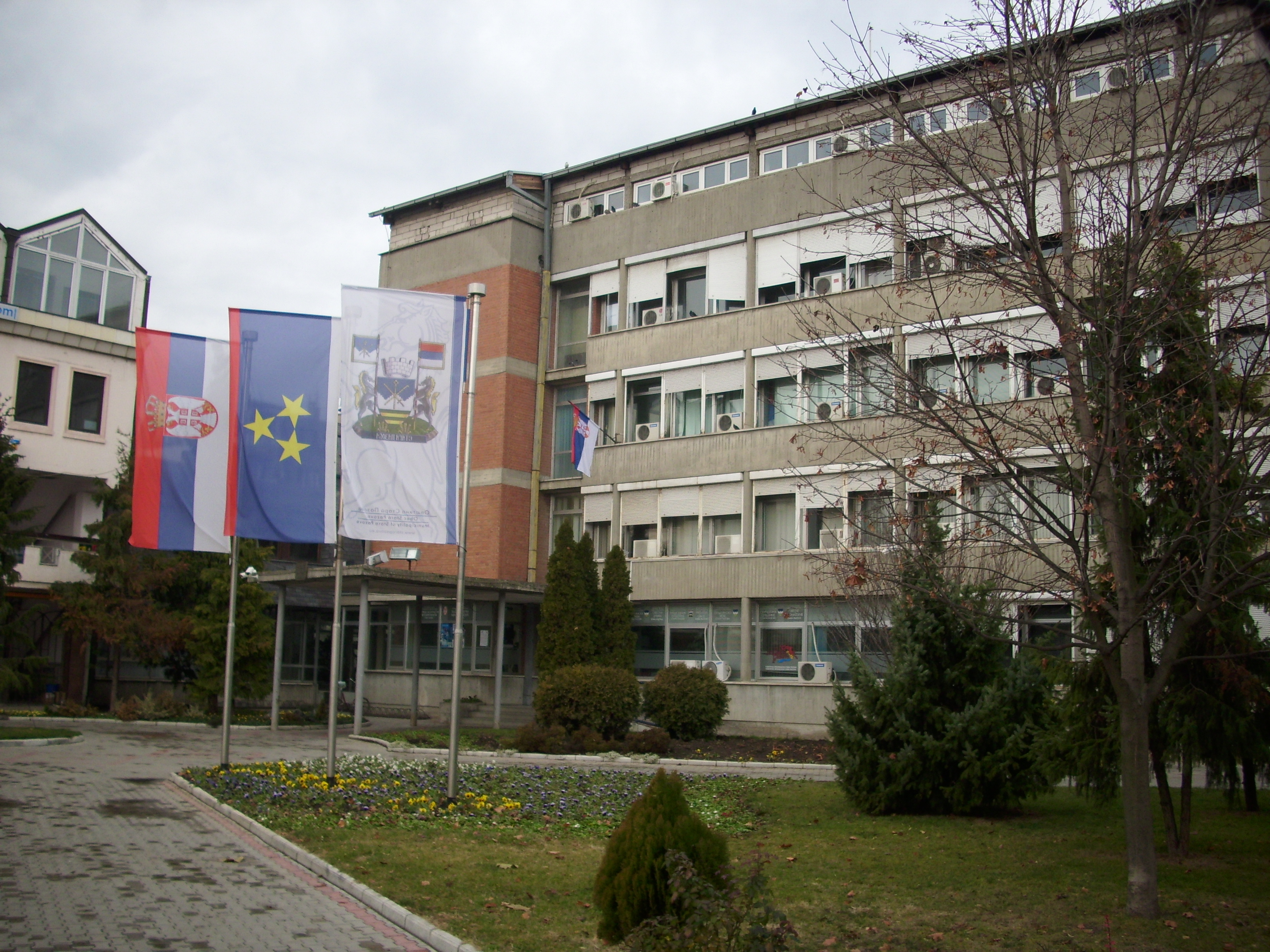
Town Hall

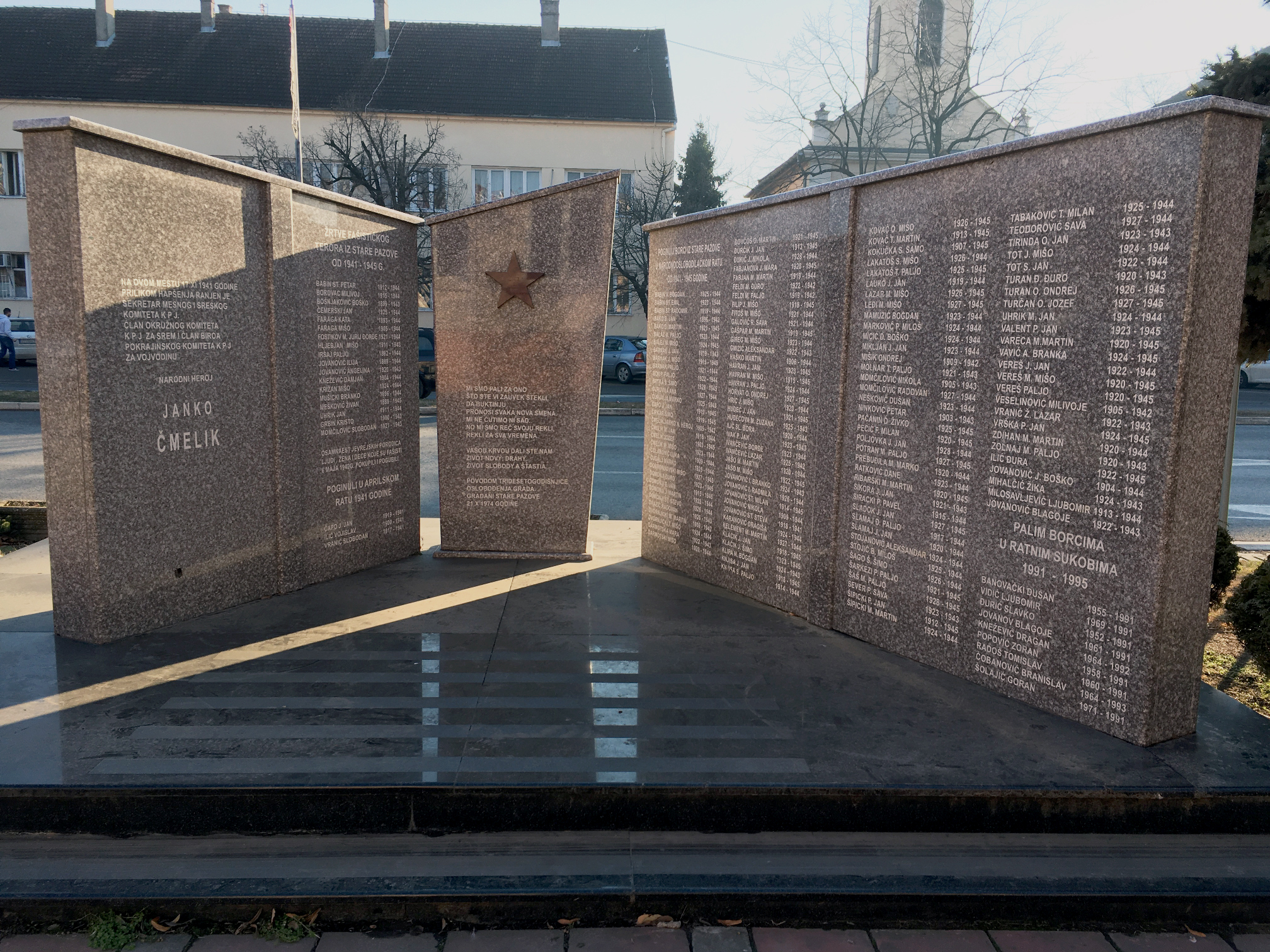
Monument to the victims of fascism and wars of the 90s

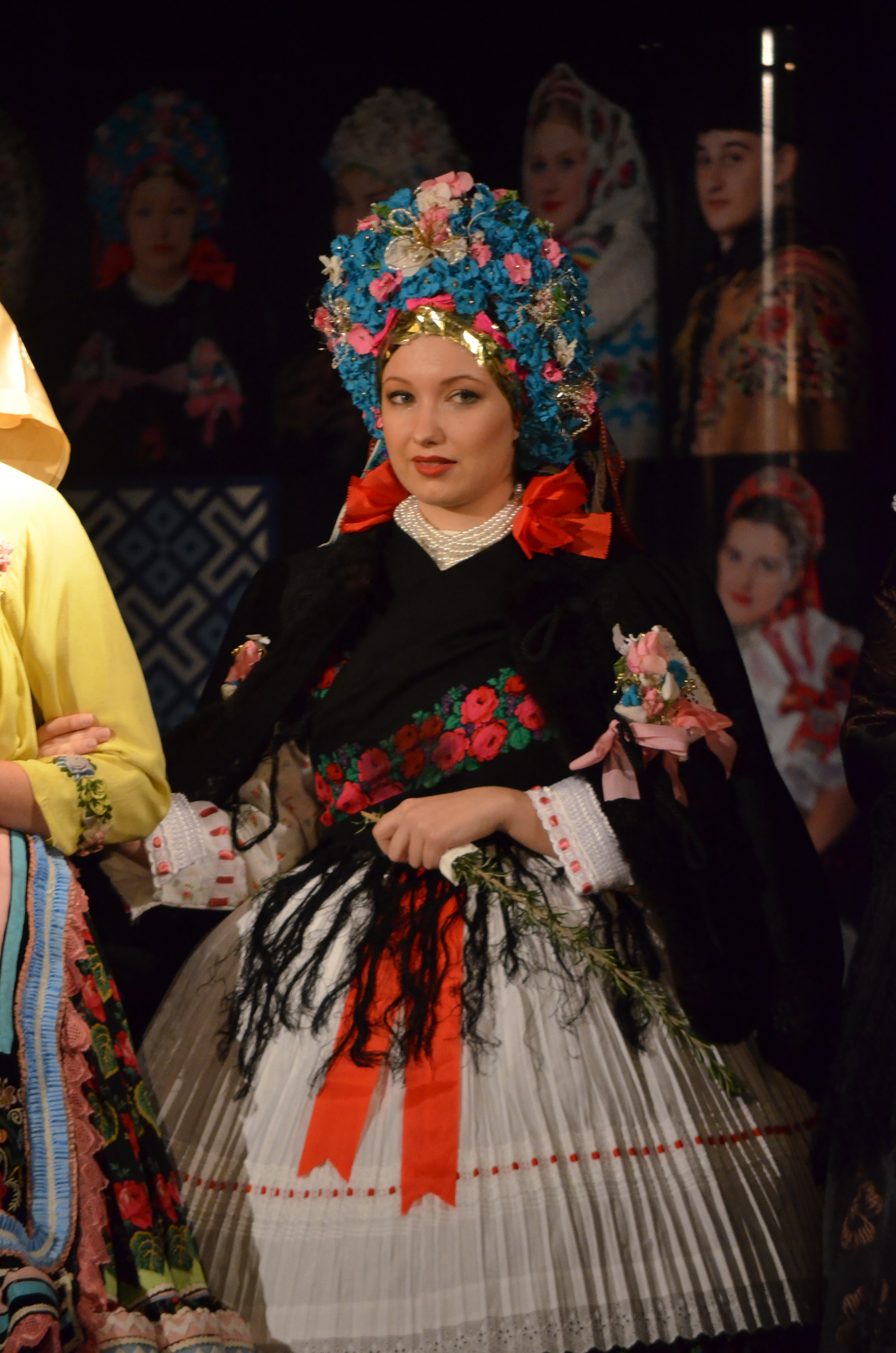
Girl in Slovak Folk Wedding Costume

== Twin towns – sister cities ==
Stara Pazova is twinned with:

- Hlinsko, Czech Republic
- Púchov, Slovakia

== See also ==
- List of places in Serbia
- List of cities, towns and villages in Vojvodina
