= Protestantism in Serbia =

Protestantism is the 4th largest religious denomination in Serbia, after Eastern Orthodoxy, Catholicism and Islam. According to the 2022 census, there were 54,678 Protestants in Serbia, making up 0.8% of the population. They have historically been made up of Magisterial Protestants (Lutherans and Calvinists) and Radicals (Anabaptists/Nazarenes), although in recent decades Evangelical Protestants (Pentecostals and Baptists) and various Restorationists (mainly Adventists) have expanded their presence and now account for roughly one-fifth of the Protestant population.

== Demographics ==
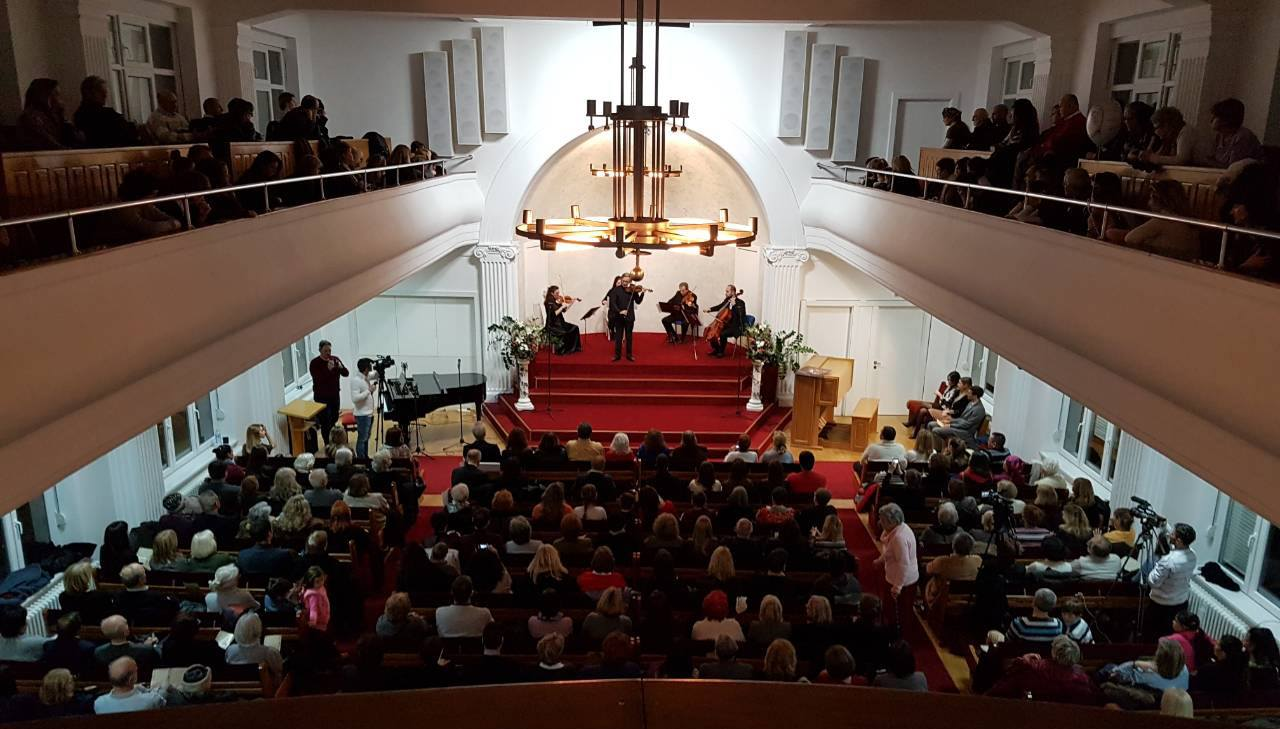
Violin performance during a service at the Adventist church in Belgrade

Protestantism in Serbia has a strong following among ethnic Slovaks, who are predominantly Lutheran and constitute the majority of the country's Protestant population. It is also present among Hungarians, who are predominantly Reformed (Calvinist), although a small minority of ethnic Hungarians adhere to Protestantism. By contrast, only a tiny fraction of the ethnic Serbs are Protestants, historically associated with the Anabaptist (Nazarene) movement and today primarily affiliated with Adventism. The published data from the 2022 Census included a crosstab of ethnicity and religion, which showed that adherents of Protestantism were divided between the following ethnic groups:

- 33,488 Slovaks (61.2%)
- 10,639 Hungarians (19.4%)
- 3,971 Roma (7.2%)
- 3,951 Serbs (7.2%)
- 2,629 others, undeclared or unknown (4.8%)

The vast majority of Protestants in Serbia are concentrated in Vojvodina, with the highest proportions at the municipal level found in the municipalities of Bački Petrovac and Kovačica, where ethnic Slovaks constitute either an absolute or a relative majority of the population. A sizeable Protestant population is also found in Novi Sad, the provincial capital and country's second-largest city. Outside Vojvodina, a notable concentration of Protestants is recorded in Leskovac, primarily among the city's Roma population.

City / municipality	Protestants	Share
Kovačica	8,767	41.4%
Bački Petrovac	6,594	57.2%
Novi Sad	6,567	1.8%
Stara Pazova	3,752	6%
Bačka Palanka	3,579	7.4%
Subotica	3,238	2.6%
Leskovac	3,016	2.4%
Bačka Topola	2,971	11.3%
Belgrade	2,453	0.1%
Pančevo	1,868	1.6%
Zrenjanin	1,764	1.6%
Subotica	1,609	1.3%
Mali Iđoš	1,516	15.2%
Šid	1,326	4.7%

== Denominations ==
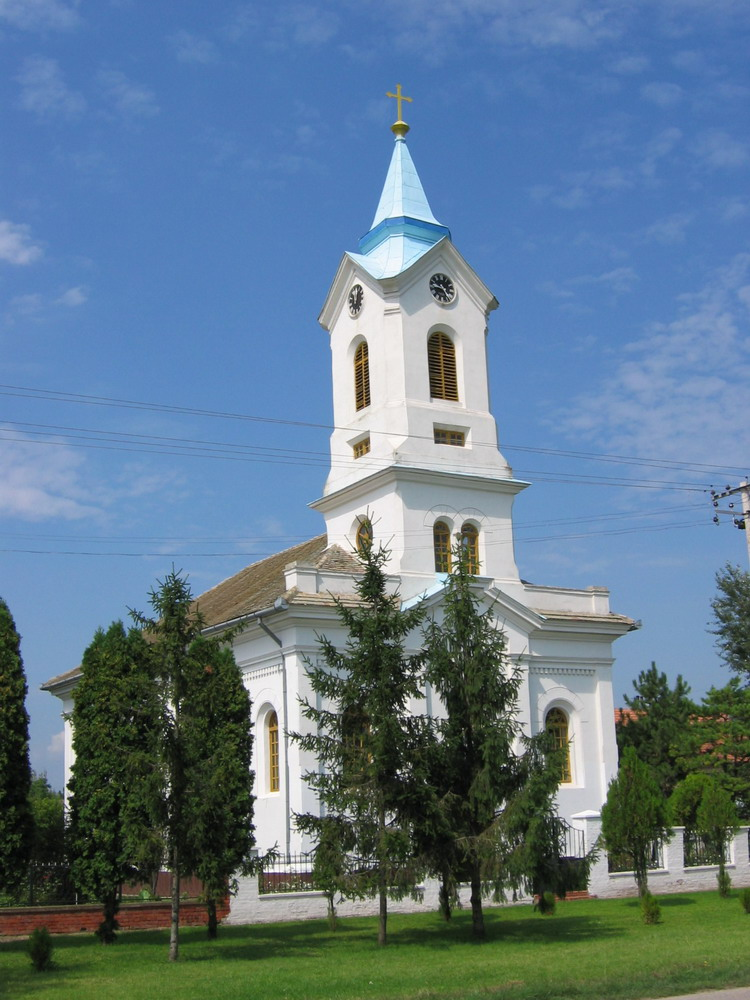
Slovak Evangelical (Lutheran) church in Janošik

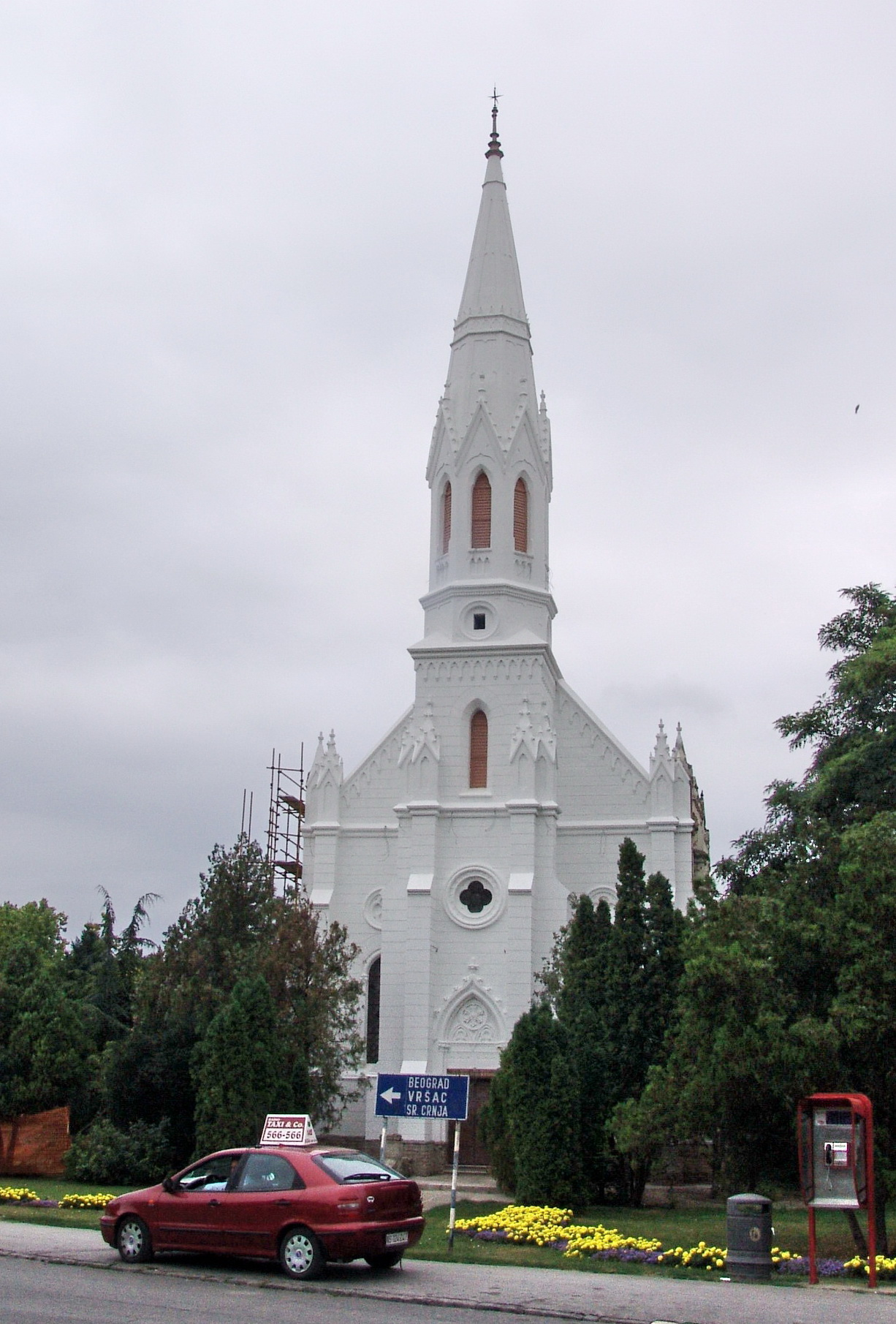
Reformed (Calvinist) church in Zrenjanin

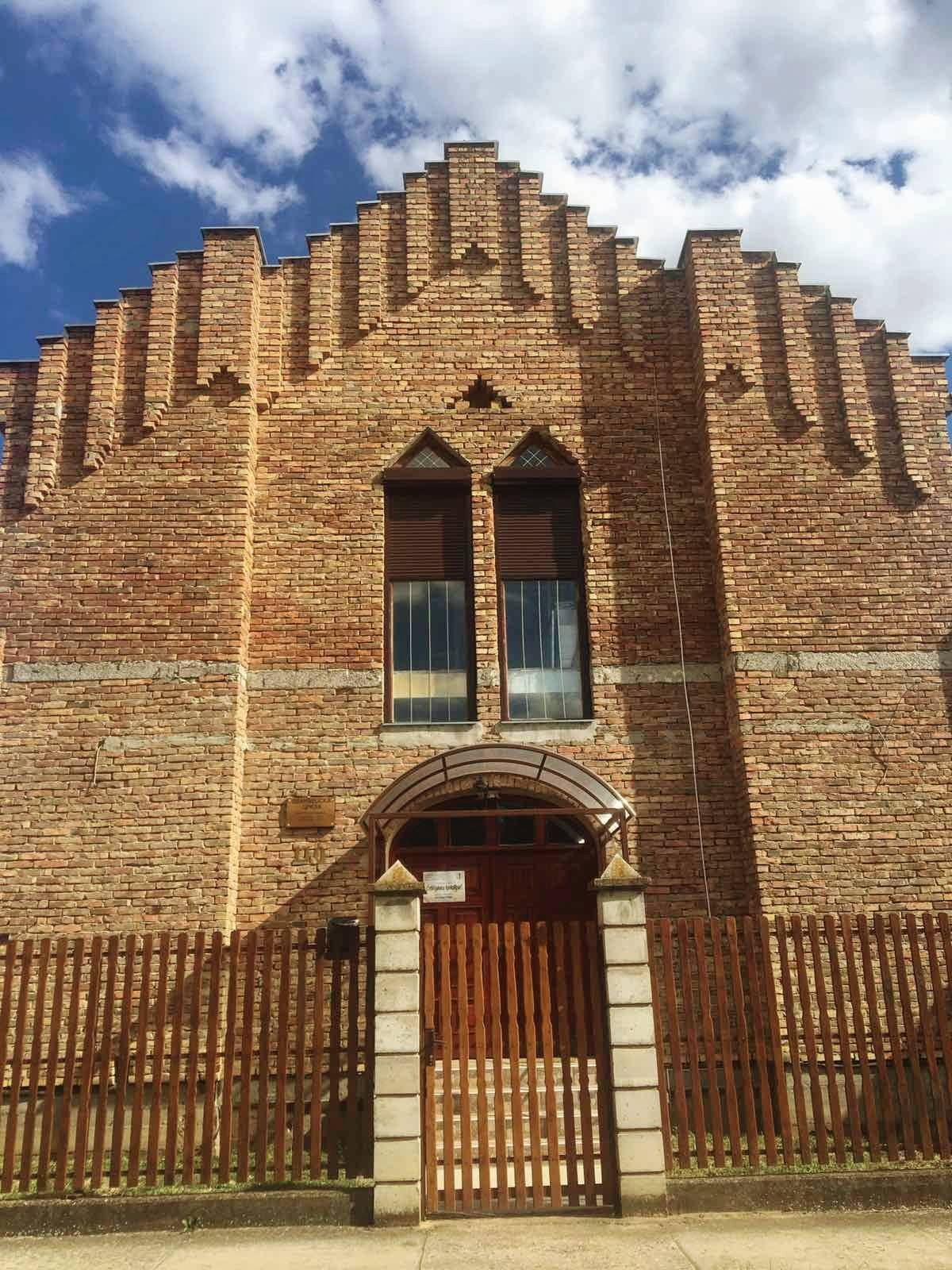
Evangelical (Pentecostal) church in Kikinda

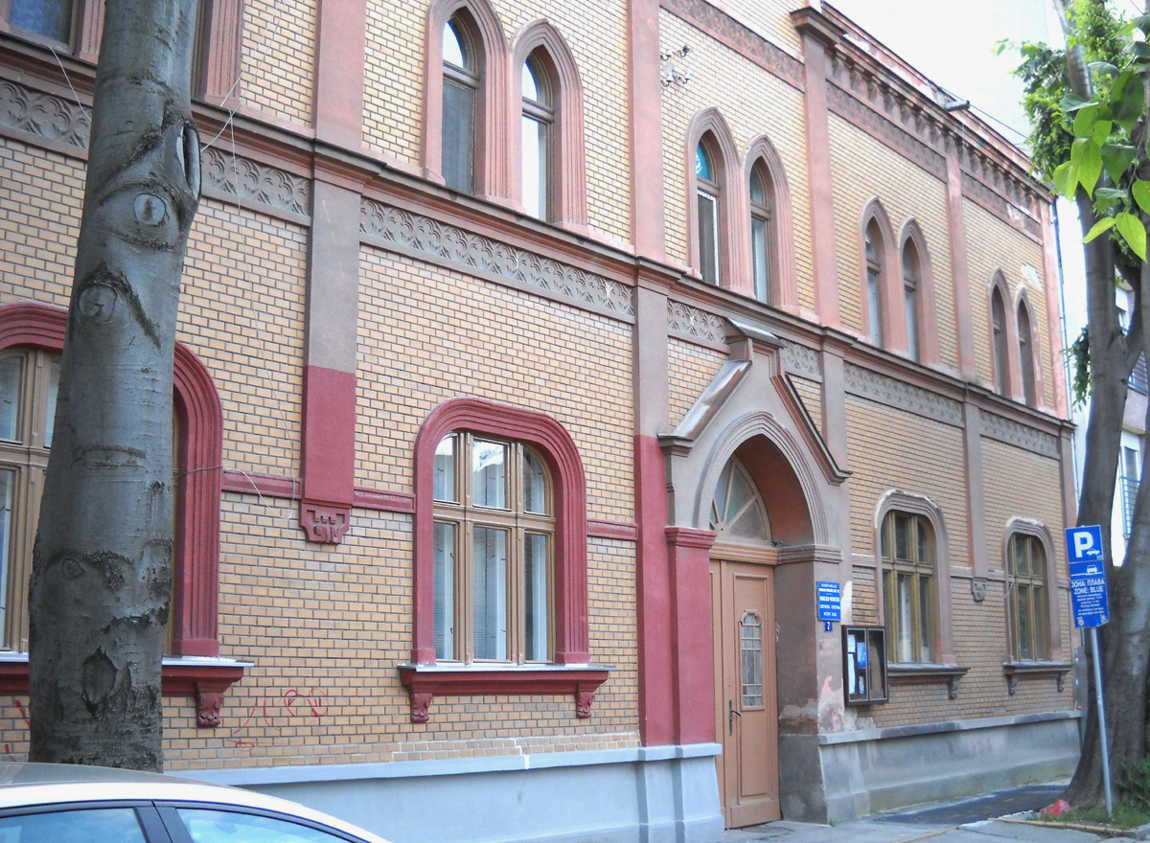
Evangelical Methodist church in Novi Sad

=== Lutherans ===
The Slovak Evangelical Church of the Augsburg Confession in Serbia is the main Lutheran church in the country. Member of the Lutheran World Federation (global communion of national and regional Lutheran denominations), it has nearly 35,000 members, the vast majority of whom are ethnic Slovaks. Headquartered in Novi Sad, the church is organized into 27 congregations led by 20 pastors.

A small Evangelical Christian Church of the Augsburg Confession in Serbia also exists, primarily serving ethnic Hungarians from northern Bačka.

=== Reformed (Calvinists) ===
The Reformed Christian Church in Serbia is the only Reformed (Calvinist) church in the country. Church has some 8,000 members most of which are ethnic Hungarians. Headquartered in Novi Sad, the church is organized into 14 congregations, in northern Bačka and Banat.

=== Adventists ===
Christian Adventist Church in Serbia is the main Adventist church in the country and the national branch of the worldwide Seventh-day Adventist Church. There are about 7,000 active Adventist adherents and 75 Adventist churches in Serbia. First Adventist missionaries in the territory of present-day Serbia started their work in 1890 with first Adventist community formed in the village of Kumane in Banat in 1905. Subsequently, the Adventist communities were formed in Titel, Novo Miloševo and Mokrin (1906), Kikinda (1907), Belgrade and Novi Kneževac (1909), Zemun (1910). The Christian Adventist Church also founded a correspondence Bible school, which, during the existence of socialist Yugoslavia, enrolled about 4,000 students annually studying in Serbo-Croatian (3,000 using the Cyrillic script and 1,000 using Latin script).

There is also the relatively small Seventh Day Adventist Reform Movement Union, a Sabbatarian Adventist movement that originated in a schism within the European Seventh-day Adventist Church during World War I.

=== Pentecostals ===
The Protestant Evangelical Church is the main Evangelical church in the country and belongs to the Pentecostal movement. Member of the Assemblies of God (global communion of Pentecostal denominations), it has around 50 churches with the focal points being Belgrade, Šabac, Kruševac as well as Southern Serbia. Adherents are ethnically diverse, consisting predominantly of Serbs in the northern and central parts of the country and Roma in the south, particularly in Leskovac and, to a lesser extent, Vranje.

=== Baptists ===
There are two groups of Christian Baptist communities in Serbia: Union of Baptist Churches in Serbia (41 churches and 910 members, primarily in northern Serbia) and Union of Christian Baptist Churches in Serbia (16 churches and 343 members, mainly in central and southern Serbia). Both are members of the European Baptist Federation and the Baptist World Alliance.

=== Anabaptists (Nazarenes) ===
The Nazarenes, known as the Apostolic Christian Church (Nazarene) and belonging to Anabaptism movement, were once a much larger denomination (particularly among the ethnic Serbs in Vojvodina), but their numbers declined sharply during the 20th century, from more than 16,000 in the 1920s to only a few hundred nowadays. The decline of the community had several causes: many members emigrated overseas to the United States and Canada, while some Nazarenes who had originally come from an Eastern Orthodox background converted back to Eastern Orthodoxy, and others joined different Protestant denominations.

=== Methodists ===
The Evangelical Methodist Church in Serbia is present in Serbia since 1898. It is part of the global Evangelical Methodist Church.

== See also ==
- Religion in Serbia
- Christianity in Serbia
