= Roads in Serbia =

Roads in Serbia are the backbone of its transportation system and an important part of the European road network. The total length of roads in the country is 45,419 km, and they are categorized as "state roads" (total length of 16,179 km) or "municipal roads" (total length of 23,780 km). All state roads in Serbia are maintained by the public, nation-wide, road construction company JP Putevi Srbije.

== State roads ==
Major roads in the country are designated as "state roads", most of which are paved. They are categorized into class I and class II, with class I having three subclasses (A, M and B) and class II having two subclasses (A, B).

=== State roads, class IA ===
Roads that are motorways are categorized as state roads, class IA, and are marked with single-digit numbers (the "A1", "A2", "A3", "A4", "A5", "A6", "A7", "A8" and "A9" road designations represent "autoput", the Serbian word for motorway).

As of June 2026, there are 1,056.4 km (656.4 mi) of motorways (Serbian: аутопут / аutoput) in total. Motorways in Serbia are controlled-access, toll roads, which have three lanes in each direction (including hard shoulder). Signs are white-on-green and the normal speed limit is 130 km/h (81 mph).

Designation	Route	In service	Planned
A1	Border with Hungary (Horgoš border crossing) - Novi Sad - Belgrade - Niš - Vranje - border with North Macedonia (Preševo border crossing)	582.935 km	582.935 km
A2	Belgrade - Obrenovac - Lajkovac - Ljig - Gornji Milanovac - Preljina - Čačak - Požega - Arilje - Ivanjica - Boljare	150.188 km	258 km
A3	Border with Croatia (Batrovci border crossing) - Belgrade	95.444 km	95.444 km
A4	Niš - Pirot - Dimitrovgrad - border with Bulgaria (Gradina border crossing)	105.434 km	105.434 km
A5	Pojate - Kruševac - Kraljevo - Preljina	102.355 km	115.253 km
A6	Novi Sad - Zrenjanin - Belgrade	0 km	89.5 km
A7	Kuzmin (intersection with A3) - Bosut - Border with Bosnia and Herzegovina near Sremska Rača	0 km	18 km
A8	Ruma (intersection with A3) - Hrtkovci - Šabac (intersection with M3)	24.515 km	24.515 km
A9	Bubanj Potok - Pančevo - Border with Romania	0 km	km
A10	Požega (intersection with A2) - Sevojno - Border with Bosnia and Herzegovina	0 km	km
A11	Pančevo (intersection with A9) - Batajnica	0 km	km
A12	Merošina (intersection with A1) - Kuršumlija - Administrative line with Kosovo and Metohija	0 km	km
Total		1,060.871 km (659.195 mi)	1,073.769 km (667.209 mi)

=== State roads, class IM ===
Roads categorized as state roads, class IM are expressways (Serbian: Брзи пут, Brzi put), that were greatly introduced in law of the Republic of Serbia in March 2024. Expressways in Serbia usually have two lanes in each direction (no hard shoulder). Some expressways are fully grade-separated, while others have at-grade intersections in the form of roundabouts. Signs are white-on-blue and the normal speed limit is 100 km/h.

Designation	Route	In service	Planned
M1	Border with Hungary (Bački Breg border crossing) - Sombor - Kula - Vrbas - Srbobran - Bečej - Novi Bečej - Kikinda - border with Romania (Srpska Crnja border crossing)	0 km (0 mi)	0 km (0 mi)
M2	Link with A1 (Novi Sad Jug junction) - Novi Sad - Irig - Ruma - link with A3 and A8 (Ruma junction)	0 km (0 mi)	0 km (0 mi)
M3	Link with A8 (Šabac) - Loznica	53.97 km (33.54 mi)	53.97 km (33.54 mi)
M4	Badovinci - Slepčević	0 km (0 mi)	15.3 km (9.5 mi)
M5	Novi Bečej - Zrenjanin	0 km (0 mi)	0 km (0 mi)
M6	Beograd (Kovilovo junction) - Pančevo	0 km (0 mi)	0 km (0 mi)
M7	Link with A1 (Požarevac junction) - Požarevac - Veliko Gradište - Golubac - Donji Milanovac - Brza Palanka	62.00 km (38.53 mi)	68.77 km (42.73 mi)
M8	Kladovo - Negotin - Zaječar	0 km (0 mi)	0 km (0 mi)
M9	Link with A2 (Lajkovac junction) - Divci - Valjevo - link with IB27	17.25 km (10.72 mi)	17.25 km (10.72 mi)
M10	Link with A2 - Lazarevac - Aranđelovac - Rača - Svilajnac - Despotovac - Bor - Zaječar	0 km (0 mi)	0 km (0 mi)
M11	Link with A1 and A3 (Belgrade junction) - Airport junction - Mostar junction - link with A1 and A9 (Bubanj potok junction)	30.01 km (18.65 mi)	30.01 km (18.65 mi)
M12	Link with M11 (Airport junction) - Belgrade Nikola Tesla Airport	1.94 km (1.21 mi)	1.94 km (1.21 mi)
M13	Link with A1 (Mali Požarevac junction) - Mladenovac - Aranđelovac (link with IB10)	0 km (0 mi)	0 km (0 mi)
M14	Topola - Kragujevac	0 km (0 mi)	0 km (0 mi)
M15	Link with A1 (Batočina junction) - Batočina - Kragujevac - Knić - link with A5 (Katrga junction)	18.91 km (11.75 mi)	18.91 km (11.75 mi)
M16	Link with A1 (Paraćin) - Zaječar - border crossing with Bulgaria (Vrška čuka)	0 km (0 mi)	0 km (0 mi)
M17	Link with A5 - Kraljevo - Raška - Novi Pazar	0 km (0 mi)	0 km (0 mi)
M18	Nova Varoš - Sjenica - Novi Pazar	0 km (0 mi)	0 km (0 mi)
M19	Raška - Administrative border (Jarinje)	0 km (0 mi)	0 km (0 mi)
Total		185.73 km (115.41 mi)	217.45 km (135.12 mi)

=== State roads, class IB ===
Roads categorized as state roads, class IB are 4,486 km in total length as of June 2022 and are marked with two-digit numbers. They have one lane in each direction, signs are black-on-yellow and the normal speed limit is 80 km/h.

Designation	Route
10	Belgrade - Pančevo - Vršac - border with Romania (Vatin border crossing)
11	Border with Hungary (Kelebija border crossing) - Subotica - A1 motorway
12	Subotica - Sombor - Odžaci - Bačka Palanka - Novi Sad - Zrenjanin - Žitište - Nova Crnja - border with Romania (Srpska Crnja border crossing)
13	Horgoš - Kanjiža - Novi Kneževac - Čoka - Kikinda - Zrenjanin - Čenta - Belgrade
14	Pančevo - Kovin - Ralja - intersection with State Road 33
15	Border with Hungary (Bački Breg border crossing) - Bezdan - Sombor - Kula - Vrbas - Srbobran - Bečej - Novi Bečej - Kikinda - border with Romania (Nakovo border crossing)
16	Border with Croatia (Bezdan border crossing) - Bezdan
17	Border with Croatia (Bogojevo border crossing) - Srpski Miletić
18	Zrenjanin - Sečanj - Plandište - Vršac - Straža - Bela Crkva - border with Romania (Kaluđerovo border crossing)
19	Intersection with State Road 12 - Neštin - Erdevik - Kuzmin - border with Bosnia and Herzegovina (Sremska Rača border crossing)
20	A3 motorway - Sremska Mitrovica - Bogatić - border with Bosnia and Herzegovina (Badovinci border crossing)
21	Novi Sad - Irig - Ruma - Šabac - Koceljeva - Valjevo - Kosjerić - Požega - Arilje - Ivanjica - Sjenica
22	Belgrade - Ljig - Gornji Milanovac - Preljina - Kraljevo - Raška - Novi Pazar - Ribariće - border with Montenegro (Mehov Krš border crossing)
23	Preljina - Čačak - Požega - Užice - Čajetina - Nova Varoš - Prijepolje - border with Montenegro (Gostun border crossing)
24	Batočina - Kragujevac - Kraljevo
25	Mali Požarevac - Mladenovac - Topola - Kragujevac
26	Belgrade - Obrenovac - Šabac - Loznica - border with Bosnia and Herzegovina (Mali Zvornik border crossing)
27	Border with Bosnia and Herzegovina (Trbušnica border crossing) - Loznica - Osečina - Valjevo - Lajkovac - Ćelije - Lazarevac - Aranđelovac - Topola - Rača - Svilajnac
28	Mali Zvornik - Ljubovija - Rogačica - Kostojevići - Užice - Sušica - Kremna - border with Bosnia and Herzegovina (Kotroman border crossing)
29	Border with Montenegro (Jabuka border crossing) - Prijepolje - Nova Varoš - Sjenica - Novi Pazar
30	Ivanjica - Ušće
31	Raška - border with Kosovo (Jarinje border crossing) - Leposavić - Mitrovica - Vučitrn - Pristina - Ferizaj - border with North Macedonia (Elez Han border crossing)
32	Ribariće - border with Kosovo (Vitkoviće border crossing) - Zubin Potok - Mitrovica
33	A1 motorway - Požarevac - Kučevo - Majdanpek - Negotin - border with Bulgaria (Mokranje border crossing)
34	Požarevac - Veliko Gradište - Golubac - Donji Milanovac - Poreč bridge - intersection with State Road 35
35	Border with Romania (Đerdap border crossing) - Kladovo - Negotin - Zaječar - Knjaževac - Svrljig - Niš - Merošina - Prokuplje - Kuršumlija - border with Kosovo (Merdare border crossing) - Podujevo - Pristina - Lipljan - Štimlje - Suva Reka - Prizren - border with Albania (Vërmica border crossing)
36	Paraćin - Boljevac - Zaječar - border with Bulgaria (Vrška Čuka border crossing)
37	Selište - Bor - Zaječar
38	Kruševac (Makrešane) - Blace - Beloljin
39	Pirot - Babušnica - Vlasotince - Leskovac - Lebane - Medveđa - border with Kosovo (Mutivode border crossing) - Pristina - Peja - border with Montenegro (Čakor border crossing)
40	Vladičin Han - Surdulica - border with Bulgaria (Strezimirovci border crossing)
41	Bujanovac (A1 motorway) - border with Kosovo (Končulj border crossing) - Gjilan - Ferizaj - Štimlje
42	Intersection with State Road 258 - Preševo - border with Kosovo - Gjilan - Pristina
45	Entirely in Kosovo (Dolac - Gjakova - border with Albania (Morinë border crossing))
46	Ravni Gaj - Knić - Mrčajevci
47	Belgrade (intersection with State Roads 10 and 13) - Belgrade (Bogoslovija)

==== Kosovo ====
Roads that partly or entirely lay in Kosovo (see Roads in Kosovo).

Designation	Route
31	Raška - border with Kosovo (Jarinje border crossing) - Leposavić - Mitrovica - Vučitrn - Pristina - Ferizaj - border with North Macedonia (Elez Han border crossing)
32	Ribariće - border with Kosovo (Vitkoviće border crossing) - Zubin Potok - Mitrovica
35	Border with Romania (Đerdap border crossing) - Kladovo - Negotin - Zaječar - Knjaževac - Svrljig - Niš - Merošina - Prokuplje - Kuršumlija - border with Kosovo (Merdare border crossing) - Podujevo - Pristina - Lipljan - Štimlje - Suva Reka - Prizren - border with Albania (Vërmica border crossing)
39	Pirot - Babušnica - Vlasotince - Leskovac - Lebane - Medveđa - border with Kosovo (Mutivode border crossing) - Pristina - Peja - border with Montenegro (Čakor border crossing)
41	Bujanovac (A1 motorway) - border with Kosovo (Končulj border crossing) - Gjilan - Ferizaj - Štimlje
45	Entirely in Kosovo (Dolac - Gjakova - border with Albania (Morinë border crossing))

=== State roads, class IIA ===
State roads, class IIA, are marked with three-digit numbers, the first digit being 1 or 2. The total length of these roads is 7,799 km as of June 2022.

Designation	Route
100	Horgoš intersection - Subotica - Bačka Topola - Srbobran - Novi Sad - Inđija - Stara Pazova - Belgrade
101	Border with Hungary near Bački Vinogradi - State Road 100 at Bački Vinogradi
102	Kanjiža - Senta - Ada - Bečej - Temerin - Novi Sad (Temerin intersection)
103	Border with Hungary near Đala - Novi Kneževac
104	Novi Kneževac - Banatsko Aranđelovo - Mokrin - Kikinda - Vojvoda Stepa - Begejci - Srpski Itebej - Border with Romania near Međa
105	Border with Hungary near Bajmok - Bajmok - Bačka Topola - Senta - Čoka - Mokrin - Border with Romania near Vrbica
106	Kljajićevo - Bački Sokolac
107	Sombor - Apatin - Bogojevo
108	Bačka Topola - Kula - Despotovo - Silbaš - Bačka Palanka - Border with Croatia near Bačka Palanka
109	Bačka Topola - Bečej
110	Kula - Odžaci
111	Odžaci - Ratkovo - Silbaš - Bački Petrovac - Rumenka - Novi Sad
112	Bačko Novo Selo - Bač - Ratkovo - Despotovo - Sirig - Temerin - Žabalj
113	Feketić - Vrbas - Zmajevo - Rumenka
114	Bačko Gradište - Čurug - Žabalj - Šajkaš - A1 motorway
115	Srbobran - Nadalj - Čurug
116	Novi Bečej - Melenci
117	Novi Bečej - Bašaid - Banatsko Karađorđevo
118	Žitište - Torak - Srpski Itebej
119	Border with Croatia near Neštin - Beočin - Sremska Kamenica
120	Border with Croatia near Šid - Šid - Kuzmin - Sremska Mitrovica- Ruma - Pećinci - Bečmen - Obrenovac
121	Border with Croatia near Sot - Šid - Adaševci - Border with Bosnia and Herzegovina near Jamena
122	Border with Croatia near Ljuba - Erdevik
123	Sviloš - Sremska Mitrovica (intersection with State Road 20)
124	Sremska Mitrovica - Drenovac - Šabac
125	A1 motorway - Maradik
126	Ruma - Putinci - Inđija - Stari Slankamen
127	Putinci - Stara Pazova - Stari Banovci
128	Golubinci - Pećinci
129	Kać - Šajkaš - Titel - Perlez - Kovačica - Sečanj - Border with Romania near Jaša Tomić
130	Ečka - Kovačica - Jabuka - Pančevo
131	Čenta - Opovo - Jabuka
132	Plandište - Alibunar
133	Uljma - Straža
134	Kovin - Vračev Gaj - Bela Crkva
135	Badovinci - Mačvanski Prnjavor
136	Majur - Bogatić - Petlovača
137	Šabac - Volujac - Zavlaka - Krupanj - Gračanica
138	Lipnički Šor - Tekeriš
139	Krst - Korenita - Krupanj - Radaljska Banja - Radalj - State Road 26
140	Zvezd - Vladimirci - Lojanice
141	Debrc - Banjani - Ub - Novaci - Koceljeva - Šabačka Kamenica - Donje Crniljevo - Osečina - Gunjaci - Pecka - Ljubovija
142	Draginje - Šabačka Kamenica - Valjevska Kamenica - State Road 27
143	Pričević - Pecka
144	Obrenovac - Stubline - Ub - Slovac
145	Stubline - Brgule - Lajkovac
146	Ub - Brgule
147	Lipovica Forest - Barajevo - Dučina - Mladenovac - Smederevska Palanka - Velika Plana - Žabari - Petrovac - Kučevo
148	Barič - Mislođin - Stepojevac - Veliki Crljeni - Junkovac - Sibnica - Dučina
149	Beli Potok - Ralja - Đurinci - Vlaško Polje
150	Đurinci - Sopot - Aranđelovac - Belanovica - Ljig - Mionica - Divci
151	State Road 25 - Markovac - Aranđelovac
152	Topola - Donja Šatornja - Rudnik - Bućin Grob
153	Leštane - Grocka - Petrijevo - Ralja - A1 motorway
154	Leštane - Bubanj Potok - A1 motorway
155	Petrijevo - Mladenovac
156	Ralja - Smederevska Palanka - Natalinci
157	Rača - Cerovac
158	Mala Krsna - Velika Plana - Batočina - Jagodina - Ćuprija - Paraćin - Aleksinac - Niš - Leskovac - Vladičin Han - Vranje - Bujanovac - Preševo
159	Požarevac - Kostolac
160	Požarevac - Žabari - Svilajnac - Despotovac - Dvorište - Resavica - Senje - Ćuprija
161	Bratinac - Salakovac - Malo Crniće - Petrovac - Žagubica - Brestovac
162	Veliko Gradište - Makce - Boževac - Ranovac - Petrovac - Tanovac - Dubnica - Svilajnac
163	Golubac - Zelenik - Lješnica
164	Donji Milanovac - Majdanpek - Debeli Lug - Jasikovo - Žagubica
165	Porečki most - Klokočevac - Miloševa Kula - Rgotina - Vražogrnac - Zaječar - Zvezdan
166	Bor - Zagrađe
167	Kladovo - Korbovo - Milutinovac
168	State road 35 - Dušanovac - Border with Romania near Kusjak
169	State road 33 - Veljkovo - Šipkovo - Zaječar - Lenovac - Bučje
170	Valjevo - Poćuta - Debelo Brdo - Rogačica - Bajina Bašta - Kaluđerske Bare - Kremna
171	Dub - Bajina Bašta - Border with Bosnia and Herzegovina near Bajina Bašta
172	Bajina Bašta - Perućac
173	Kremna - Dubci
174	Užice - Karan - Kosjerić - Seča Reka - Varda - Jakalj - Kostojevići
175	Županjac - Bogovađa - Mionica - Brežđe - Divčibare - Kaona
176	Valjevo - Brežđe
177	State road 21 - Čestobrodica - Gojna Gora - Pranjani - Beršići - Takovo- Gornji Milanovac - Nevade - Vraćevšnica Bare - Kragujevac
178	Divčibare - Tometino Polje - Sastavci
179	Pranjani - Trbušani - Ljubić (Čačak) - Čačak - Drakčići - Kraljevo
180	Čačak - Guča - Ivanjica
181	Kratovska Stena - Lučani - Guča - Kaona - Drakčići
182	Ravni Gaj (Barajevo) – Knić – Mrčajevci Promoted to State Road 46 at a unknown date.
183	Kragujevac – Gornja Sabanta – Rekovac - Belušić - Jasika - A5 motorway
184	Gornja Sabanta – Jagodina – A1 motorway
185	Jagodina – Glogovac – Medveđa
186	Ćuprija – Virine – Despotovac – Dvorište – Vodna – Krepoljin
187	Vitanovac – Ugljarevo – Velika Drenova – Jasika – Varvarin – Mijatovac
188	Rekovac – Prevešt – Grabovac – Trstenik
189	State road 158 – Bresje – Loćika – Belušić – Oparić – Velika Drenova – Stopanja
190	Donji Krčin – Varvarin – Ćićevac
191	Bistrica – Priboj – Border with Bosnia and Herzegovina near Uvac
192	Border with Montenegro near Čemerno - Border with Bosnia and Herzegovina near Vagan
193	Border with Bosnia and Herzegovina – Sjeverin – Border with Bosnia and Herzegovina
194	Prilike – Katići – Jasenovo – Kokin Brod – Rutoši – Pribojska Banja – Priboj – State road 192
195	Bela Zemlja – Ljubiš – Jasenovo
196	Lis – Arilje – Visoka – Ljubiš
197	Kaona – Ivanjica – Buk – Preko Brdo – Duga Poljana – Rasno – Karajukića Bunari – Ugao – Border with Montenegro
198	Raška – Kuti – Odvraćenica (Radaljica) – Preko Brdo
199	Novi Pazar – Deževa – Odvraćenica (Radaljica)
200	Prijepolje – Manastir Mileševa – Uvac

=== State roads, class IIB ===
State roads, class IIB, are marked with three-digit numbers, the first digit being 3 or 4. Total length of these roads is 3,156 km as of June 2022.

Designation	Route
300	Subotica – Velebit – State Road 102
301	Zimonić – Velebit
302	Banatsko Aranđelovo – Rabe
303	Stari Žednik – Čantavir – Tornjoš
304	Kljajićevo – Svetozar Miletić – Riđica
305	Vrbas – Kucura – Savino Selo
306	Gajdobra – Čelarevo
307	Bašaid – Nova Crnja
308	Torak – Krajišnik – Sutjeska – Neuzina
309	Krajišnik – Jaša Tomić
310	Samoš – Dobrica– Seleuš – Alibunar – Banatski Karlovac – Deliblato – State Road 134
311	Padina – Seleuš
312	Vračev Gaj – Banatska Palanka – Dunav
313	Rakovac – Zmajevac – Vrdnik – Irig – Krušedol Selo – Maradik – State Road 100
314	Erdevik – Bingula – Čalma – Manđelos – Veliki Radinci – Ruma – State Road 120
315	Kukujevci – State Road 19
316	Sremska Mitrovica – Jarak
317	Pećinci – Subotište – Kupinovo
318	Prhovo – Šimanovci – A3 motorway
319	A1 motorway – Batajnica – Ugrinovci – Surčin – A1 motorway
320	Bogatić – Glogovac – Crna Bara – Border with Bosnia and Herzegovina
321	Glogovac – Badovinci
322	Glušci – Mačvanski Pričinović – Šabac (intersection with State Road 124)
323	Mačvanski Prnjavor – Čokešina – Lipove Vode – Volujac – Sinošević – Nakučani - Matijevac – State Road 21
324	Šabac (intersection with State Road 26) – Nakučani – Donje Crniljevo
325	Provo – Zvezd – State Road 26

== Municipal roads ==
Minor, local roads in the country are designated as "municipal roads". Total length of these roads is 23,780 km and some two-thirds are paved roads, while the rest are consisted of macadam and earthen roads.

== European routes ==
The following European routes pass through Serbia:

- E65: Rožaje, Montenegro – Tutin – Mitrovica – Pristina – Elez Han, Kosovo – Skopje, North Macedonia.
- E70: Slavonski Brod, Croatia – Šid – Belgrade – Vršac – Timișoara, Romania.
  - section between Belgrade and border with Croatia is built to motorway standards.
- E75: Szeged, Hungary – Subotica – Novi Sad – Beška Bridge – Belgrade – Niš – Leskovac – Vranje – Preševo – Kumanovo, North Macedonia.
  - section from border with Hungary to border with Northern Macedonia is built to motorway standards.
- E80: Rožaje, Montenegro – Peja – Pristina, Kosovo – Prokuplje – Niš – Niška Banja – Pirot – Dimitrovgrad – Sofia, Bulgaria.
  - section between Niš and border with Bulgaria is built to motorway standards.
- E662: Subotica – Sombor – Bezdan – Osijek, Croatia.
- E761: Sarajevo, Bosnia and Herzegovina – Užice – Čačak – Kraljevo – Kruševac – Pojate – Paraćin – Zaječar.
  - section between Pojate and Paraćin is built to motorway standards and co-signed with E75.
- E763: Belgrade – Čačak – Nova Varoš – Bijelo Polje, Montenegro.
  - section between Belgrade and Preljina is built to motorway standards.
- E771: Drobeta-Turnu Severin, Romania – Zaječar – Niš.

== See also ==
- Road signs in Serbia
