= State Road 26 (Serbia) =

Road in Serbia

State Road 26
- Serbian: Državni put IB reda 26; Serbian Cyrillic: Државни пут IБ реда 26

Route information
- Maintained by JP "Putevi Srbije"
- Length: 146.570 km (91.074 mi)

Major junctions
- From: Belgrade A1 / E75
- To: Serbia-Bosnia and Herzegovina border at Mali Zvornik M-4

Location
- Country: Serbia
- Districts: City of Belgrade, Mačva

Highway system
- Roads in Serbia; Motorways
← 25	→ 27

State Road 26 is an IB-class road in northern and central Serbia, connecting Belgrade with Bosnia and Herzegovina at Mali Zvornik. It is located in Belgrade and Šumadija and Western Serbia regions.

Before the new road categorization regulation given in 2013, the route wore the following names: M 19, M 14.1 and M 4 (before 2012) / 21 and 13 (after 2012).

The existing route is a main road with two traffic lanes. By the valid Space Plan of Republic of Serbia the road is not planned for upgrading to motorway, and is expected to be conditioned in its current state.

== Sections ==
Section number	Length	Distance	Section name
02601	7.229 km (4.492 mi)	7.229 km (4.492 mi)	Ostružnica interchange - Umka
02602	7.983 km (4.960 mi)	15.212 km (9.452 mi)	Umka - Barič
02603	0.917 km (0.570 mi)	16.129 km (10.022 mi)	Barič - Obrenovac
02604	5.149 km (3.199 mi)	21.278 km (13.222 mi)	Obrenovac - Obrenovac (Zvečka)
02605	25.935 km (16.115 mi)	47.213 km (29.337 mi)	Obrenovac (Zvečka) - Debrc
02606	4.964 km (3.084 mi)	52.177 km (32.421 mi)	Debrc - Zvezd (Vladimirci)
02607	1.077 km (0.669 mi)	53.254 km (33.091 mi)	Zvezd (Vladimirci) - Zvezd (Provo)
02608	13.536 km (8.411 mi)/1.896 km (1.178 mi)	66.790 km (41.501 mi)	Zvezd (Provo) - Šabac (Lojanice)
02112	0.799 km (0.496 mi)	67.589 km (41.998 mi)	Šabac (Lojanice) - Šabac (overlap with)
02609	1.372 km (0.853 mi)	68.961 km (42.850 mi)	Šabac - Šabac (Zablaće)
02611	2.488 km (1.546 mi)	71.449 km (44.396 mi)	Šabac (Zablaće) - Šabac (Jevremovac)
02612	1.972 km (1.225 mi)	73.421 km (45.622 mi)	Šabac (Jevremovac) - Šabac (Drenovac)
02613	4.061 km (2.523 mi)	77.482 km (48.145 mi)	Šabac (Drenovac) - Majur
02614	14.854 km (9.230 mi)	92.336 km (57.375 mi)	Majur - Petlovača
02615	7.415 km (4.607 mi)	99.751 km (61.982 mi)	Petlovača - Prnjavor
02616	18.101 km (11.247 mi)	117.852 km (73.230 mi)	Prnjavor - Lipnički Šor
02617	1.341 km (0.833 mi)	119.193 km (74.063 mi)	Lipnički Šor - Loznica (entrance)
02618	6.628 km (4.118 mi)	125.821 km (78.182 mi)	Loznica (entrance) - Loznica (Trbušnica) (overlap with)
02619	6.387 km (3.969 mi)	132.208 km (82.150 mi)	Loznica (Trbušnica) - Banja Koviljača
02620	12.068 km (7.499 mi)	144.276 km (89.649 mi)	Banja Koviljača - Radalj
02621	2.096 km (1.302 mi)	146.372 km (90.951 mi)	Radalj - Mali Zvornik
02622	0.198 km (0.123 mi)	146.570 km (91.074 mi)	Mali Zvornik - Serbia-Bosnia and Herzegovina border (Mali Zvornik)

== See also ==
- Roads in Serbia
