= State Road 20 (Serbia) =

Road in Serbia

State Road 20
- Serbian: Državni put IB reda 20; Serbian Cyrillic: Државни пут IБ реда 20

Route information
- Maintained by JP "Putevi Srbije"
- Length: 42.474 km (26.392 mi)

Major junctions
- From: Sremska Mitrovica
- A3 near Sremska Mitrovica; 123 near Sremska Mitrovica; 120 in Sremska Mitrovica; 124 near Sremska Mitrovica; 322 in Glušci; 136 in Bogatić; 135 in Badovinci
- To: Serbia – Bosnia and Herzegovina border at Badovinci M18-2

Location
- Country: Serbia
- Districts: Srem, Mačva

Highway system
- Roads in Serbia; Motorways
← 19	→ 21

State Road 20 is an IB-class road in northern and western Serbia, connecting Sremska Mitrovica with Bosnia and Herzegovina at Badovinci. It is located in Vojvodina and Šumadija and Western Serbia regions.

Before the new road categorization regulation given in 2013, the route wore the following names: P 103.2, P 116, P 208a and P 209a (before 2012) / 125 (after 2012).

The existing route is a main road with two traffic lanes. By the valid Space Plan of Republic of Serbia the road is not planned for upgrading to motorway, and is expected to be conditioned in its current state.

== Sections ==
Section number	Length	Distance	Section name
02001	2.795 km (1.737 mi)	2.795 km (1.737 mi)	Sremska Mitrovica – Sremska Mitrovica (Manđelos)
02002	2.826 km (1.756 mi)	5.621 km (3.493 mi)	Sremska Mitrovica (Manđelos) – Sremska Mitrovica (Drenovac)
02003	9.547 km (5.932 mi)	15.168 km (9.425 mi)	Sremska Mitrovica (Drenovac) – Vojvodina border (Noćaj)
02004	2.524 km (1.568 mi)	17.692 km (10.993 mi)	Vojvodina border (Noćaj) – Glušci
02005	10.011 km (6.221 mi)	27.703 km (17.214 mi)	Glušci – Bogatić (Glogovac)
02006	0.835 km (0.519 mi)	28.538 km (17.733 mi)	Bogatić (Glogovac) – Bogatić (Majur)
02007	10.919 km (6.785 mi)	39.457 km (24.517 mi)	Bogatić (Majur) – Badovinci
02008	3.017 km (1.875 mi)	42.474 km (26.392 mi)	Badovinci – Serbia – Bosnia and Herzegovina border (Badovinci)

== See also ==
- Roads in Serbia
