= State Road 30 (Serbia) =

Road in Serbia

State Road 30
- Serbian: Državni put IB reda 30; Serbian Cyrillic: Државни пут IБ реда 30

Route information
- Maintained by JP "Putevi Srbije"
- Length: 53.054 km (32.966 mi)

Major junctions
- From: Ivanjica
- To: Ušće

Location
- Country: Serbia
- Districts: Moravica, Raška

Highway system
- Roads in Serbia; Motorways
← 29	→ 31

State Road 30 is an IB-class road in western Serbia, connecting Ivanjica with Ušće. It is located in Šumadija and Western Serbia.

Before the new road categorization regulation given in 2013, the route wore the following names: M 21.1 and P 116 (before 2012) / 36 (after 2012).

The existing route is a main road with two traffic lanes. By the valid Space Plan of Republic of Serbia the road is not planned for upgrading to motorway, and is expected to be conditioned in its current state.

== Sections ==
Section number	Length	Distance	Section name
03001	2.579 km (1.603 mi)	2.579 km (1.603 mi)	Ivanjica - Ivanjica (Kaona)
03002	1.383 km (0.859 mi)	3.962 km (2.462 mi)	Ivanjica (Kaona) - Buk
03003	49.092 km (30.504 mi)	53.054 km (32.966 mi)	Buk - Ušće

== See also ==
- Roads in Serbia
