= State Road 28 (Serbia) =

Road in Serbia

State Road 28
- Serbian: Državni put IB reda 28; Serbian Cyrillic: Државни пут IБ реда 28

Route information
- Part of E761 / E763 Užice-Sušica E761 Sušica-Kotroman
- Maintained by JP "Putevi Srbije"
- Length: 172.486 km (107.178 mi)

Major junctions
- From: Mali Zvornik 26
- To: Serbia-Bosnia and Herzegovina border at Kotroman M-5

Location
- Country: Serbia
- Districts: Mačva, Zlatibor

Highway system
- Roads in Serbia; Motorways
← 27	→ 29

State Road 28 is an IB-class road in western Serbia, connecting Mali Zvornik with Bosnia and Herzegovina at Kotroman. It is located in Šumadija and Western Serbia.

Before the new road categorization regulation given in 2013, the route wore the following names: M 19.1, P 111, M 5, M 21 and P 112 (before 2012) / 144, 143, 145 and A4 (after 2012).

The existing route is a main road with two traffic lanes. By the valid Space Plan of Republic of Serbia the road is not planned for upgrading to motorway, and is expected to be conditioned in its current state.

Section from Užice to Serbia-Bosnia and Herzegovina border is a part of E761, while Užice-Sušica part also bears the route E763.

== Sections ==
Section number	Length	Distance	Section name
02801	37.730 km (23.444 mi)	37.730 km (23.444 mi)	Mali Zvornik - Gračanica
02802	7.064 km (4.389 mi)	44.794 km (27.834 mi)	Gračanica - Ljubovija
02803	35.703 km (22.185 mi)	80.497 km (50.019 mi)	Ljubovija - Rogačica (Debelo Brdo)
02804	0.102 km (0.063 mi)	80.599 km (50.082 mi)	Rogačica (Debelo Brdo) - Rogačica (Bajina Bašta)
02805	7.089 km (4.405 mi)	87.688 km (54.487 mi)	Rogačica (Bajina Bašta) - Kostojevići
02806	7.026 km (4.366 mi)	94.714 km (58.853 mi)	Kostojevići - Dub
02807	17.105 km (10.629 mi)	111.819 km (69.481 mi)	Dub - Dubci
02808	8.396 km (5.217 mi)	120.215 km (74.698 mi)	Dubci - Užice (Gostinica)
02809	0.675 km (0.419 mi)	120.890 km (75.118 mi)	Užice (Gostinica) - Užice (Karan)
02810	0.038 km (0.024 mi)	120.928 km (75.141 mi)	Užice (Karan) - Užice
02811	8.180 km (5.083 mi)	129.108 km (80.224 mi)	Užice - Bela Zemlja (overlap with)
02321	7.013 km (4.358 mi)	136.121 km (84.582 mi)	Bela Zemlja - Sušica (overlap with)
02322	16.270 km (10.110 mi)	152.391 km (94.691 mi)	Sušica - Kremna
02812	1.879 km (1.168 mi)	154.270 km (95.859 mi)	Kremna - Kremna (Tara)
02813	18.216 km (11.319 mi)	172.486 km (107.178 mi)	Kremna (Tara) - Serbia-Bosnia and Herzegovina border at Kotroman

== See also ==
- Roads in Serbia
- European route E761
- European route E763
