= State Road 23 (Serbia) =

Road in Serbia

State Road 23
- Serbian: Državni put IB reda 23; Serbian Cyrillic: Државни пут IБ реда 23
- Zlatibor Highway

Route information
- Part of E761 / E763 Preljina – Sušica E763 Sušica – Gostun
- Maintained by JP "Putevi Srbije"
- Length: 186.362 km (115.800 mi)

Major junctions
- From: Preljina 22
- 180 near Čačak; 181 near Jelen Do; 21 near Požega; 174 in Užice; 28 in Užice; 195 near Mačkat; 404 in Zlatibor; 194 in Kokin Brod; 29 in Nova Varoš; 191 in Bistrica; 200 in Prijepolje; 407 near Mijoska
- To: Serbia – Montenegro border at Gostun M-2 / E-763

Location
- Country: Serbia
- Districts: Rasina, Raška, Moravica, Zlatibor

Highway system
- Roads in Serbia; Motorways
← 22	→ 24

State Road 23, from Čačak via Zlatibor commonly known as Zlatibor Highway (Serbian: Златиборска магистрала, romanized: Zlatiborska magistrala), is an IB-class road in central and western Serbia, connecting Pojate with Montenegro at Gostun. It is located in Šumadija and Western Serbia.

Before the new road categorization regulation given in 2013, the route wore the following names: M 5, O 17, M 23.1, M 22 and M 21 (before 2012) / A4, 15, and A6 (after 2012).

The existing route is a main road with two traffic lanes. By the valid Space Plan of Republic of Serbia the section between Preljina and Požega would be transferred to the new A2 motorway, providing the faster link between Belgrade, Montenegro, and Bosnia and Herzegovina, while the Pojate – Preljina part was transferred to State Road 260 and A5 motorway in 2026.

The road is a part of the European routes E761 and E763.

== Planned motorway ==
In order to provide the faster link from Belgrade to Western Serbia and Montenegro and alleviate the dangers of the Ibar Highway, the new A2 motorway is being built on a parallel route Belgrade – Preljina (town in the municipality of Čačak) and on part of the Zlatibor Highway from Preljina to Požega.

Also, the section from Pojate to Preljina would be replaced with motorway A5, by linking the A1 and A2 motorways, allowing the citizens from Southern and Eastern Serbia to reach Western Serbia and surrounding countries Bosnia&Herzegovina and Montenegro.

== See also ==
- Roads in Serbia
- European route E761
- European route E763
