= Kaona =

Kaona may refer to:

- Kaona (Kučevo), a village in the municipality of Kučevo, Serbia
- Kaona (Lučani), a village in the municipality of Lučani, Serbia
- Kaona (Vladimirci), a village in the municipality of Vladimirci, Serbia
