= State Road 32 (Serbia) =

Road in Serbia and Kosovo

State Road 32
- Serbian: Državni put IB reda 32; Serbian Cyrillic: Државни пут IБ реда 32

Route information
- Part of E65 E80
- Maintained by JP "Putevi Srbije" (SRB) / Ministria e Infrastrukturës (RKS)
- Length: 46.904 km (29.145 mi) 10.568 km (6.567 mi) (excluding Kosovo)

Major junctions
- From: Ribariće
- To: Mitrovica E65 E80 Serbia-Kosovo border at Vitkoviće, Road M-2 E65 E80

Location
- Country: Serbia
- Districts: Raška (SRB) / Mitrovica (RKS)

Highway system
- Roads in Serbia; Motorways
← 31	→ 33

State Road 32 is an IB-class road in southwestern Serbia and Kosovo, connecting Ribariće with Mitrovica.

Before the new road categorization regulation given in 2013, the route wore the following names: M 2 (before 2012) / 33 (after 2012).

The existing route is a main road with two traffic lanes. By the valid Space Plan of the Republic of Serbia, its section of the road is not planned for upgrading to a motorway and is expected to be conditioned in its current state.

The road is a part of European routes E65 and E80.

== Sections ==
Section number	Length	Distance	Section name
03201	10.568 km (6.567 mi)	10.568 km (6.567 mi)	Ribariće – Kosovo border (Vitkoviće)
03203	17.446 km (10.840 mi)	28.014 km (17.407 mi)	Kosovo border (Vitkoviće) – Zubin Potok
03204	16.916 km (10.511 mi)	44.930 km (27.918 mi)	Zubin Potok – Mitrovica (Gornja Klina)
03205	0.807 km (0.501 mi)	45.737 km (28.420 mi)	Mitrovica (Gornja Klina) - Mitrovica (Obilić)
03206	1.167 km (0.725 mi)	46.904 km (29.145 mi)	Mitrovica (Obilić) - Mitrovica

== See also ==
- Roads in Serbia
- Roads in Kosovo
