= Nikolaje Marina =

Serbian politician

Nikolaje Marina (Serbian Cyrillic: Николаје Марина; born 1963) is a Serbian politician. He has served in the Vojvodina provincial assembly since February 2024 as a member of the Party of Freedom and Justice (SSP).

== Private career ==
Marina is a medical doctor living in the village of Seleuš in the municipality of Alibunar. He is a member of Serbia's Romanian community. In March 2023, the League of Social Democrats of Vojvodina (LSV) contended that the media portal eVršac was unfairly subjecting Marina to a "media lynching" for expressing political opinions on his Facebook page.

== Politician ==
Marina led the electoral list of the Preokret (English: U-Turn) coalition for Alibunar in the 2012 Serbian local elections. In the 2016 local elections, he appeared in the second position on the list of the Social Democratic Party (SDS). In both instances, the list fell below the electoral threshold for representation in the local assembly. Marina later joined the Party of Freedom and Justice.

The SSP took part in the 2023 Vojvodina provincial election as part of the Serbia Against Violence (SPN) coalition. Marina appeared in the twenty-second position on the coalition's list and was elected when it won thirty mandates. The Serbian Progressive Party (SNS) and its allies won a majority victory, and the SPN parties now serve in opposition. Marina is a member of the assembly's agriculture committee.

He later led a SSP list for Alibunar in the 2024 Serbian local elections and was elected when the list won four seats. As at the provincial level, the SNS and its allies won a majority government, and the SSP serves in opposition.
