= State Road 31 (Serbia) =

Road in Serbia

State Road 31
- Serbian: Državni put IB reda 31; Serbian Cyrillic: Државни пут IБ реда 31

Route information
- Part of E65 E80 Mitrovica-Pristina; E65 Pristina-Elez Han
- Maintained by JP "Putevi Srbije" (SRB) / Ministria e Infrastrukturës (RKS)
- Length: 163.694 km (101.715 mi) 10.706 km (6.652 mi) (excluding Kosovo)

Major junctions
- From: Raška
- To: Serbia-Kosovo border at Jarinje, Road N22.3; Kosovo-North Macedonia border at Elez Han A-4 E65

Location
- Country: Serbia
- Districts: Raška (SRB) / Mitrovica, Pristina, Ferizaj (RKS)

Highway system
- Roads in Serbia; Motorways
← 30	→ 32

State Road 31 is an IB-class road in southwestern Serbia and Kosovo, connecting Raška with the Serbia - Kosovo border (Jarinje), passing from the north to the south until the Kosovo - North Macedonia border (Elez Han).

Before the new road categorization regulation given in 2013, the route wore the following names: M 22.3 and M 2 (before 2012) / 32 (after 2012).

The existing route is a primary road with two traffic lanes. According to the Space Plan of the Republic of Serbia, there are no plans to upgrade this section to a motorway, and it is expected to remain in its current configuration.

The road is a part of European routes E65 and E80.

== Sections ==
State Road 31 sections
km	mi	Section	Destinations / Notes	Section ID
0.000	0.000	Raška	Road begins at Raška	—
9.049	5.623	Rudnica	Connection to Raška	03101
10.706	6.652	Jarinje	Serbia–Kosovo border	03102
Sections inside Kosovo
25.213	15.667	Dren		03103
29.860	18.554	Leposavić		03104
31.614	19.644	Leposavić (Žuta Prla)		03105
51.198	31.813	Balaban		03106
64.130	39.849	Mitrovica	Connection to Trepča Mines	03107
64.363	39.993	Mitrovica (Krpimej)		03108
65.495	40.697	Mitrovica (Zubin Potok)		03109
73.935	45.941	Mitrovica – Vučitrn		03110
81.505	50.645	Vučitrn	Novo Selo Mađunsko	03111
91.019	56.557	Miloševo (Lebane)		03112
96.820	60.161	Orlović		03113
100.082	62.188	Pristina		03114
102.928	63.956	Čaglavica		03115
110.703	68.788	Laplje Selo		03116
115.836	71.977	Konjuh		03117
119.446	74.220	Lugadžija		03118
134.052	83.296	Ferizaj		03119
139.759	86.842	Grlica		03120
144.246	89.630	Doganović (Štrpce)		03121
163.694	101.715	Elez Han	Kosovo – North Macedonia border	03122
1.000 mi = 1.609 km; 1.000 km = 0.621 mi

== See also ==
- Roads in Serbia
- Roads in Kosovo
