= State Road 19 (Serbia) =

Road in Serbia

State Road 19
- Serbian: Državni put IB reda 19; Serbian Cyrillic: Државни пут IБ реда 19

Route information
- Maintained by JP "Putevi Srbije"
- Length: 34.513 km (21.445 mi) 10.615 km (6.596 mi) unconstructed 45.128 km (28.041 mi) planned

Major junctions
- From: Bačka Palanka
- 119 near Neštin; 122 in Erdevik; 314 in Erdevik; 315 near Kuzmin; 120 in Kuzmin
- To: Serbia – Bosnia and Herzegovina border at Sremska Rača

Location
- Country: Serbia
- Districts: South Bačka, Srem

Highway system
- Roads in Serbia; Motorways
← 18	→ 20

State Road 19, is an IB-class road in northern Serbia, connecting Bačka Palanka with Bosnia and Herzegovina at Sremska Rača. It is located in Vojvodina.

Before the new road categorization regulation given in 2013, the route wore the following names: M 18 (before 2012) / 118 and 29 (after 2012).

The existing route is a partially-completed main road with two traffic lanes. By the valid Space Plan of Republic of Serbia the road is not planned for upgrading to motorway, and is expected to be conditioned in its current state.

== Sections ==
Section number	Length	Distance	Section name
01901	3.353 km (2.083 mi)	3.353 km (2.083 mi)	Bačka Palanka – Neštin (unconstructed)
01902	13.612 km (8.458 mi)	16.965 km (10.542 mi)	Neštin – Erdevik (7.262 km unconstructed)
01903	7.280 km (4.524 mi)	24.245 km (15.065 mi)	Erdevik – Kuzmin (Kukujevci)
01904	3.053 km (1.897 mi)	27.298 km (16.962 mi)	Kuzmin (Kukujevci) – Kuzmin (Sremska Mitrovica)
01905	17.830 km (11.079 mi)	45.128 km (28.041 mi)	Kuzmin (Sremska Mitrovica) – Serbia – Bosnia and Herzegovina border (Sremska Rača)

== See also ==
- Roads in Serbia
