= Radalj =

Radalj may refer to:

- Radalj, Mali Zvornik, a village in Serbia
- Roddy Radalj (born 1961), Croatian-born Australian musician and singer-songwriter
