= Radaljica =

Coordinates: 43°15′N 20°19′E

- Village (Selo)
- Interactive map of Radaljica
- Country: Serbia
- Municipality: Novi Pazar
- Time zone: UTC+1 (CET)
  - Summer (DST): UTC+2 (CEST)

Radaljica is a village situated in Novi Pazar municipality in Serbia.
