= Dvorište (Despotovac) =

Coordinates: 44°05′39″N 21°30′21″E

- Village
- Interactive map of Dvorište
- Country: Serbia
- Municipality: Despotovac

Population (2022)
  - Total: 322
- Time zone: UTC+1 (CET)
  - Summer (DST): UTC+2 (CEST)

Dvorište (Serbian Cyrillic: Двориште) is a village situated in Despotovac municipality in Serbia. As of 2022, the population is 437.
