= Kaona (Kučevo) =

Kaona Каона
- Village
- Location within Serbia
- Coordinates: 44°29′22″N 21°36′58″E
- Country: Serbia
- District: Braničevo District
- Municipality: Kučevo

Population (2022)
  - Total: 447 ▼
- Time zone: UTC+1 (CET)
  - Summer (DST): UTC+2 (CEST)

Kaona is a village in the municipality of Kučevo, Serbia. Kaona has a population of 447 people according to the 2022 census, down from 589 in 2011 and 712 in 2002.
