= Mačvanski Pričinović =

Mačvanski Pričinović Мачвански Причиновић (Serbian)
- Village (Selo)
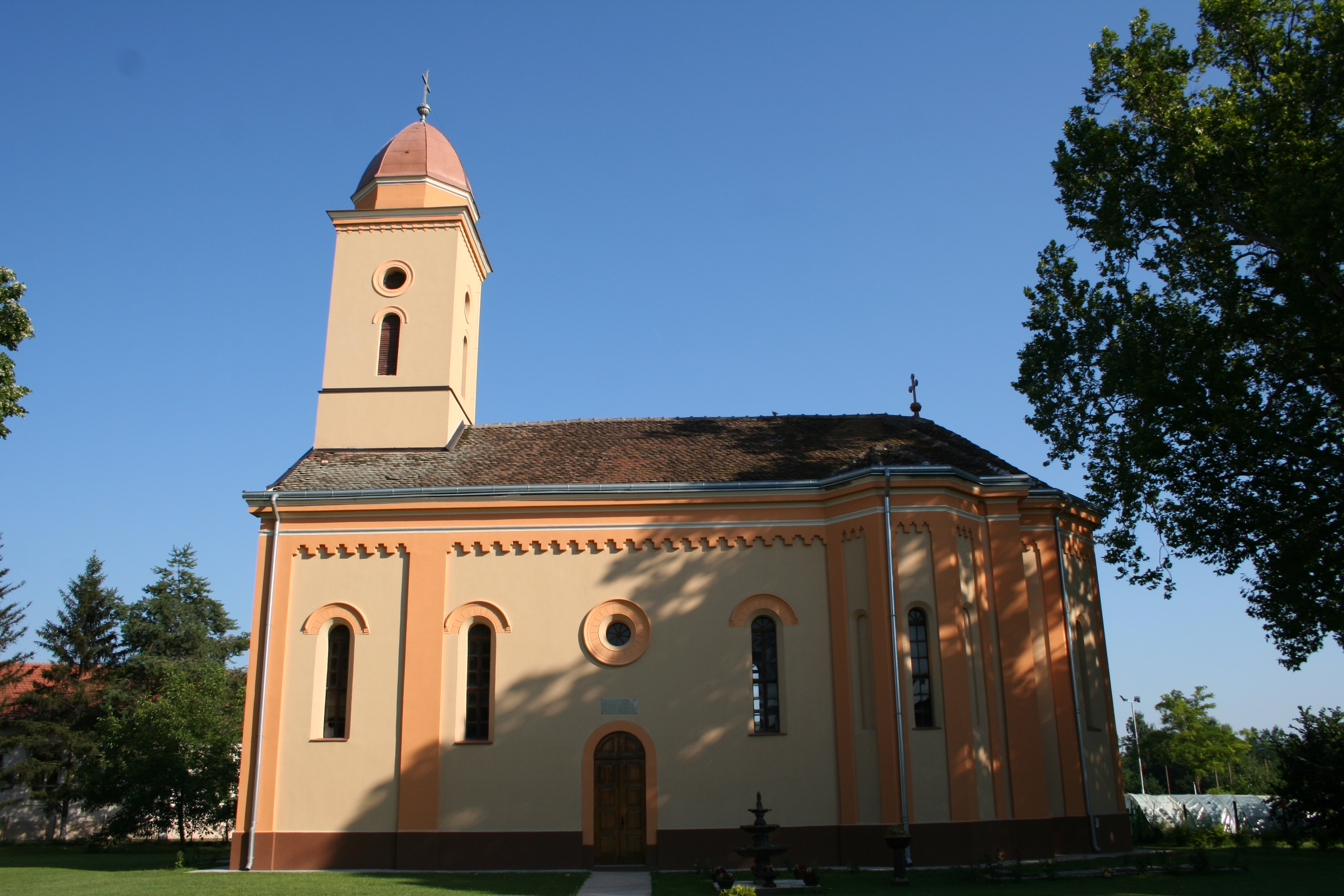

- Location within Serbia
- Coordinates: 44°51′N 19°38′E
- Country: Serbia
- Statistical Region: Šumadija and Western Serbia
- Region: Mačva
- District: Mačva District
- Municipality: Šabac
- Time zone: UTC+1 (CET)
  - Summer (DST): UTC+2 (CEST)

Mačvanski Pričinović (Serbian Cyrillic: Мачвански Причиновић) is a village in Serbia. It is situated in the Šabac municipality, in the Mačva District. The village has a Serb ethnic majority and its population numbering 1,976 people (2002 census).

== See also ==
- List of places in Serbia
- Mačva
