= Prevešt =

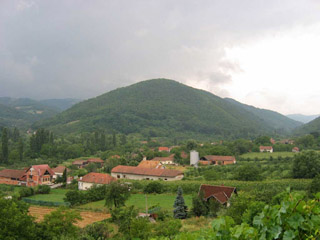

Prevešt (Serbian Cyrillic: Превешт) is a village in Šumadija and Western Serbia (Šumadija), in the municipality of Rekovac (Region of Levač), lying at 43°45′18″N 21°02′27″E.
