= Volujac (Šabac) =

Volujac Волујац (Serbian)
- Village (Selo)
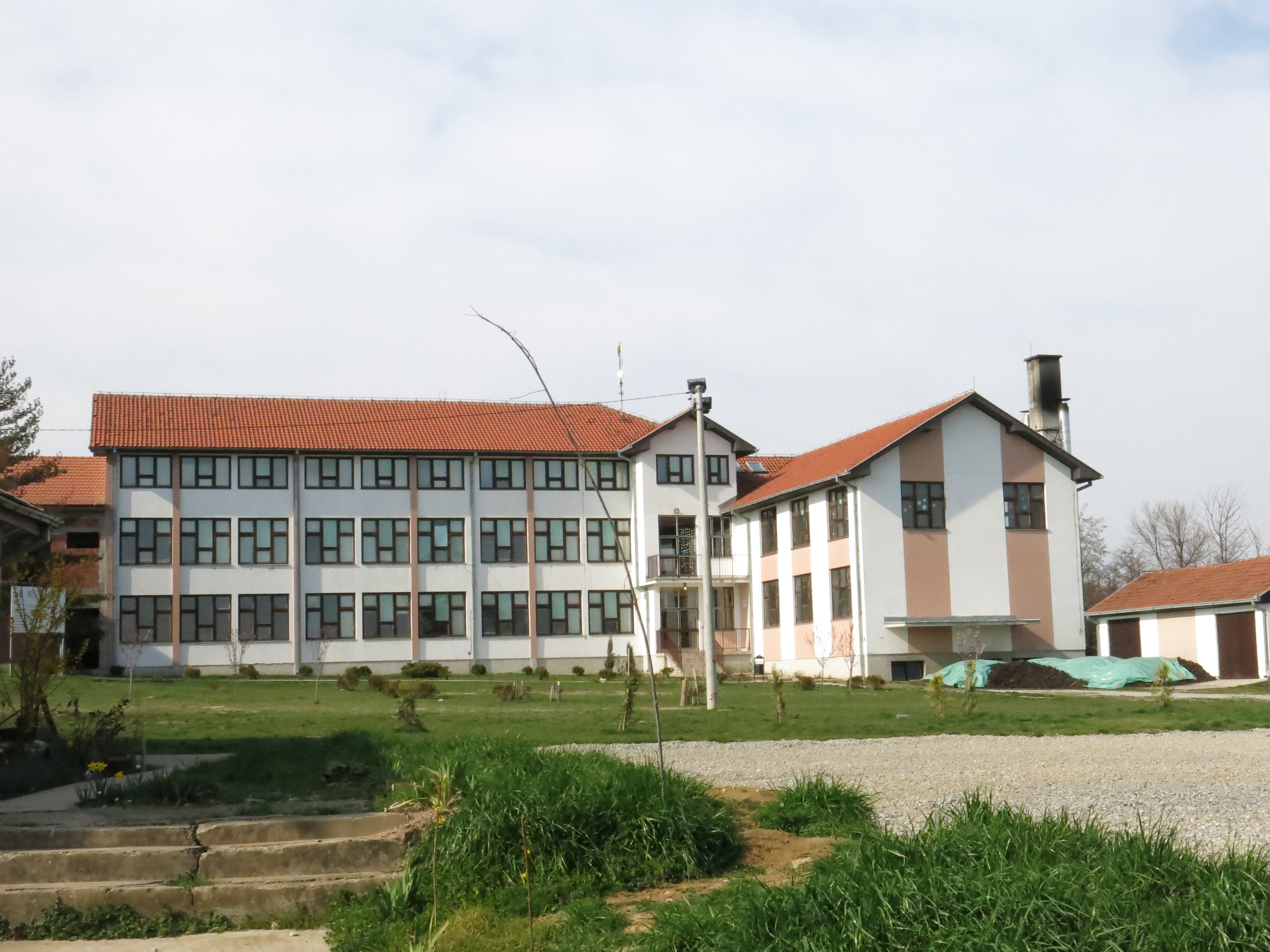

- Location within Serbia
- Coordinates: 44°36′33″N 19°36′06″E
- Country: Serbia
- District: Mačva District
- Municipality: Šabac

Population (2002)
  - Total: 382
- Time zone: UTC+1 (CET)
  - Summer (DST): UTC+2 (CEST)

Volujac is a village in the municipality of Šabac, Serbia. According to the 2002 national census, the village has a population of 382 people.

== Climate ==
The village is at its coldest in January with an average temperature of 30.38°F (-.9°C), and lows of 24.08°F (-4.4°C). The warmest month is July with an average temperature of 66.02°F (18.9°C) and highs of up to 77.9°F (25.5°C).
