= Slepčević =

Slepčević Слепчевић (Serbian)
- Village (Selo)
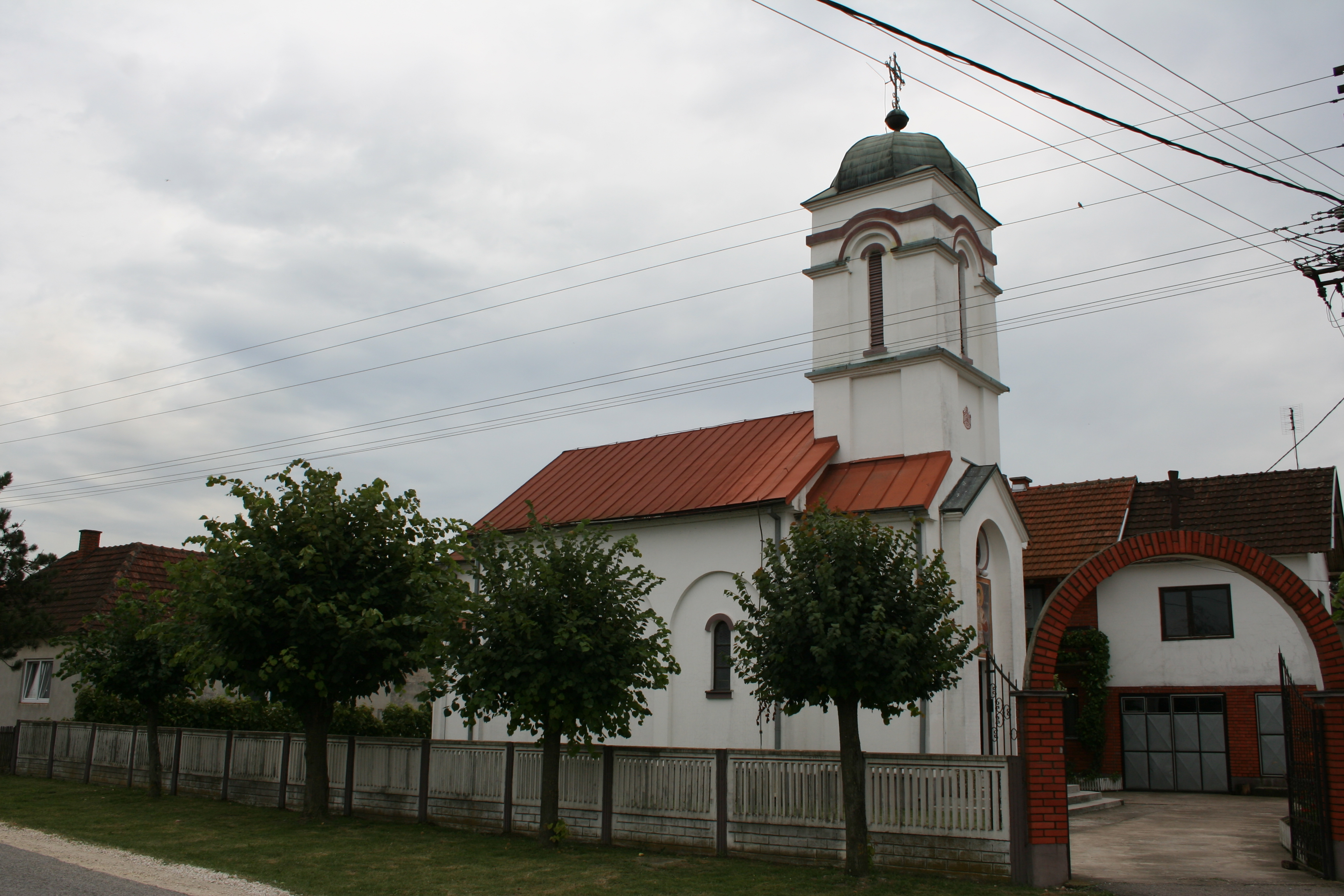

- Location within Serbia
- Coordinates: 44°45′N 19°34′E
- Country: Serbia

Population (2002)
  - Total: 1,714
- Time zone: UTC+1 (CET)
  - Summer (DST): UTC+2 (CEST)

Slepčević (Serbian Cyrillic: Слепчевић) is a village in Serbia. It is situated in the Šabac municipality, in the Mačva District. The village has a Serb ethnic majority and its population numbering 1,714 people (2002 census).

== See also ==
- List of places in Serbia
- Mačva
