= Belušić =

- Location within Serbia
- Coordinates: 43°47′22″N 21°08′41″E
- Country: Serbia
- Time zone: UTC+1 (CET)
  - Summer (DST): UTC+2 (CEST)

Belušić (Serbian Cyrillic: Белушић) is a village in Šumadija and Western Serbia, in the municipality of Rekovac (Region of Levač). The village has around 934 residents. It lies at 43°47′22″N 21°08′41″E, at the altitude of 255 m (837 feet).
