= Donji Krčin =

- Village
- Location within Serbia
- Coordinates: 43°44′09″N 21°10′56″E
- Country: Serbia
- District: Rasina District
- Municipality: Varvarin

Population (2002)
  - Total: 351
- Time zone: UTC+1 (CET)
  - Summer (DST): UTC+2 (CEST)

Donji Krčin is a village in the municipality of Varvarin, Serbia. According to the 2002 census, the village has a population of 351 people; the population further decreased to 274 people according to the 2011 census.

Historical population
Year	1948	1953	1961	1971	1981	1991	2002	2011
Pop.	712	723	650	565	531	431	351	274
±%	—	+1.5%	−10.1%	−13.1%	−6.0%	−18.8%	−18.6%	−21.9%
