= Lipnički Šor =

Lipnički Šor Липнички Шор (Serbian)
- Town
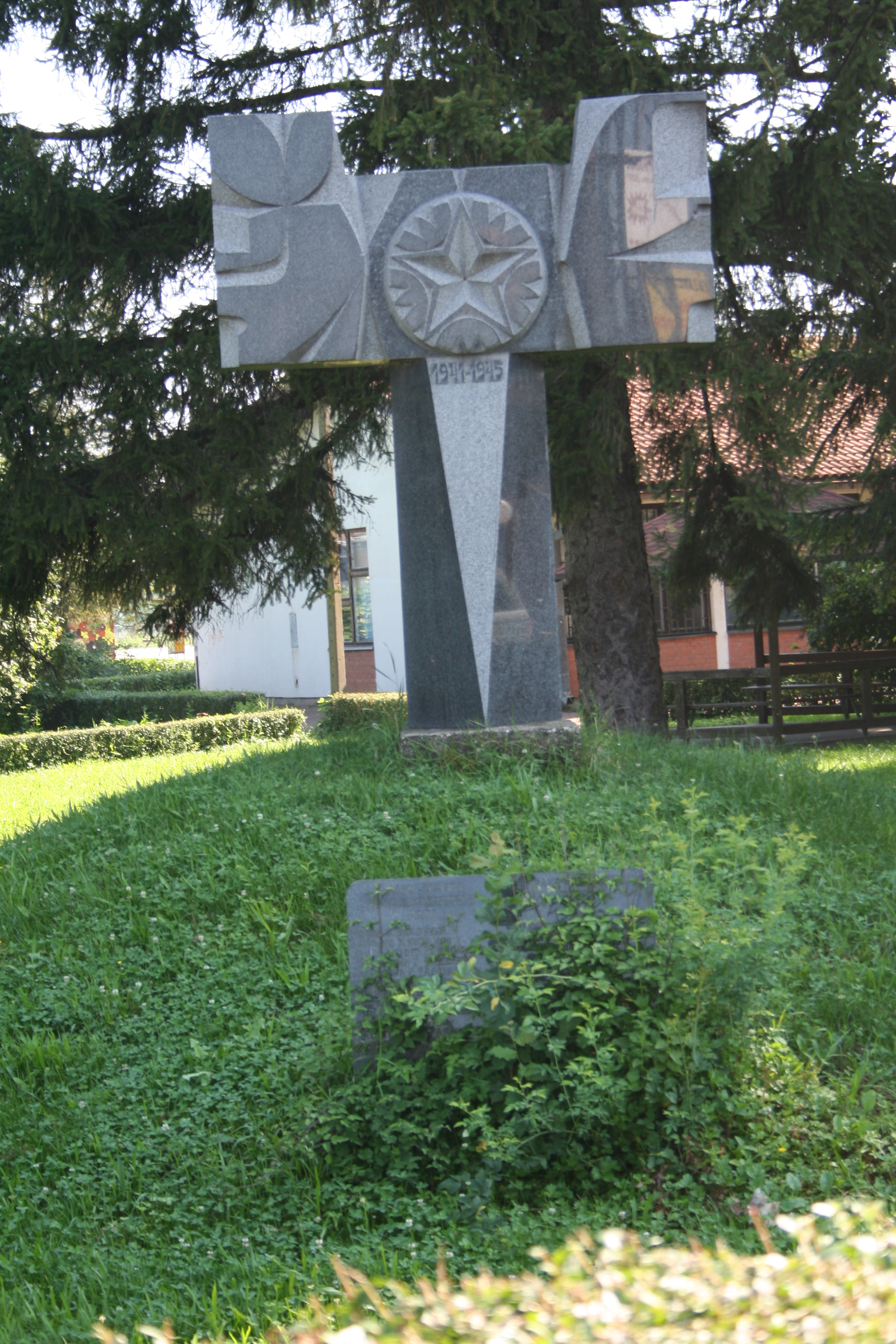

- Location within Serbia
- Coordinates: 44°34′N 19°16′E
- Country: Serbia
- District: Mačva District
- Municipality: Loznica

Population (2002)
  - Total: 2,673
- Time zone: UTC+1 (CET)
  - Summer (DST): UTC+2 (CEST)

Lipnički Šor is a town in the municipality of Loznica, Serbia. According to the 2002 census, the town has a population of 2673 people.
