= Petlovača =

Petlovača Петловача (Serbian)
- Village (Selo)
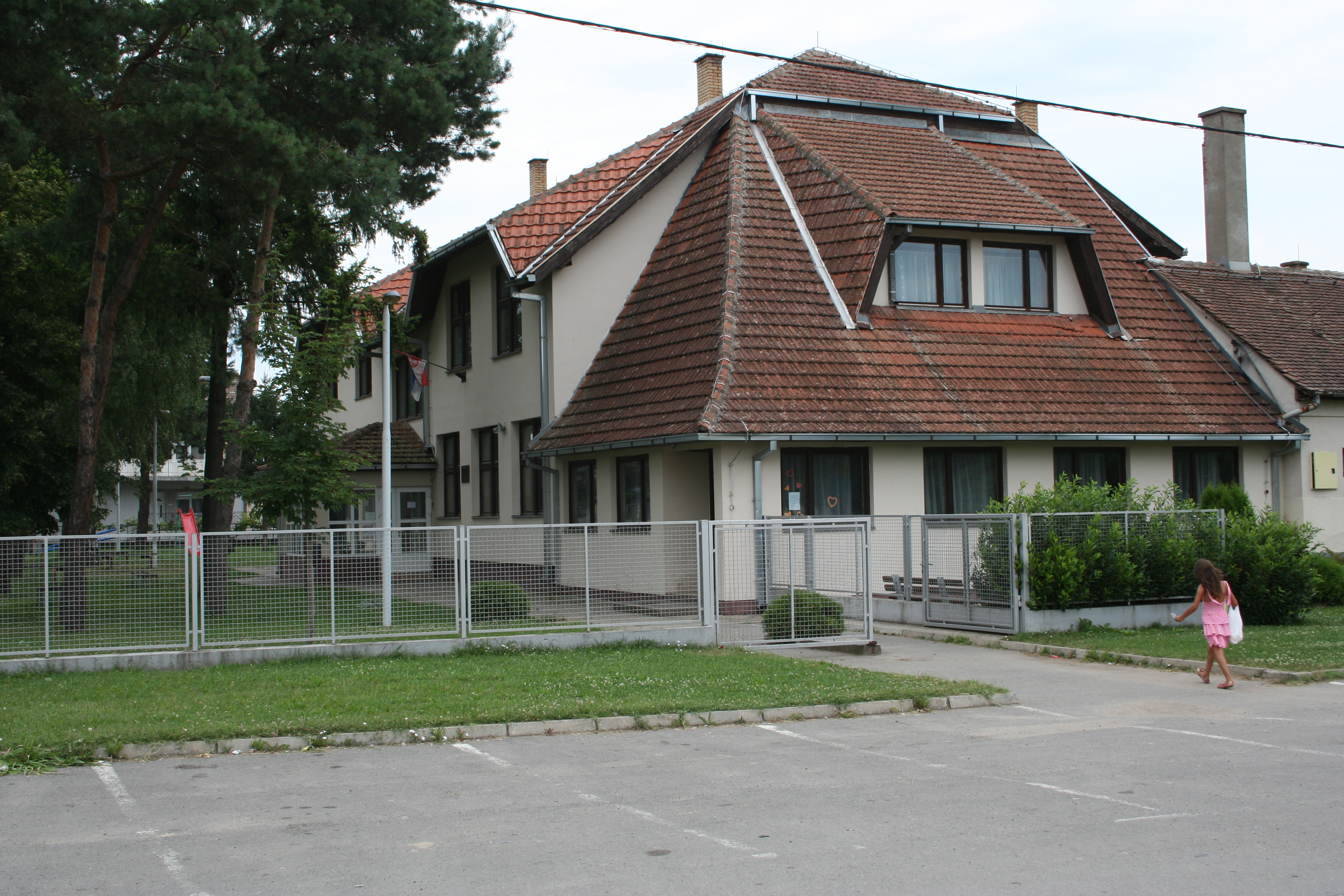

- Location within Serbia
- Coordinates: 44°44′N 19°27′E
- Country: Serbia

Population (2022)
  - Total: 1,225
- Time zone: UTC+1 (CET)
  - Summer (DST): UTC+2 (CEST)

Petlovača (Serbian Cyrillic: Петловача) is a village in Serbia. It is situated in the Šabac municipality, in the Mačva District. The village has a Serb ethnic majority and its population numbering 1,225 people (2022 census).

== See also ==
- List of places in Serbia
- Mačva
