= Kotroman (Užice) =

- Village
- Location within Serbia
- Coordinates: 43°46′N 19°28′E
- Country: Serbia
- District: Zlatibor
- Municipality: Užice

Area
  - Total: 2.82 km^{2} (1.09 sq mi)
- Elevation: 696 m (2,283 ft)

Population (2011)
  - Total: 123
  - Density: 43.6/km^{2} (113/sq mi)
- Time zone: UTC+1 (CET)
  - Summer (DST): UTC+2 (CEST)

Kotroman (Serbian Cyrillic: Котроман) is a village located in the municipality of Užice, Serbia. As of 2011 census, the village has a population of 182 inhabitants. A border crossing between Serbia and Bosnia and Herzegovina is located in the village.
