= Ušće (Kraljevo) =

Ušće Ушће (Serbian)
- Village (Selo)
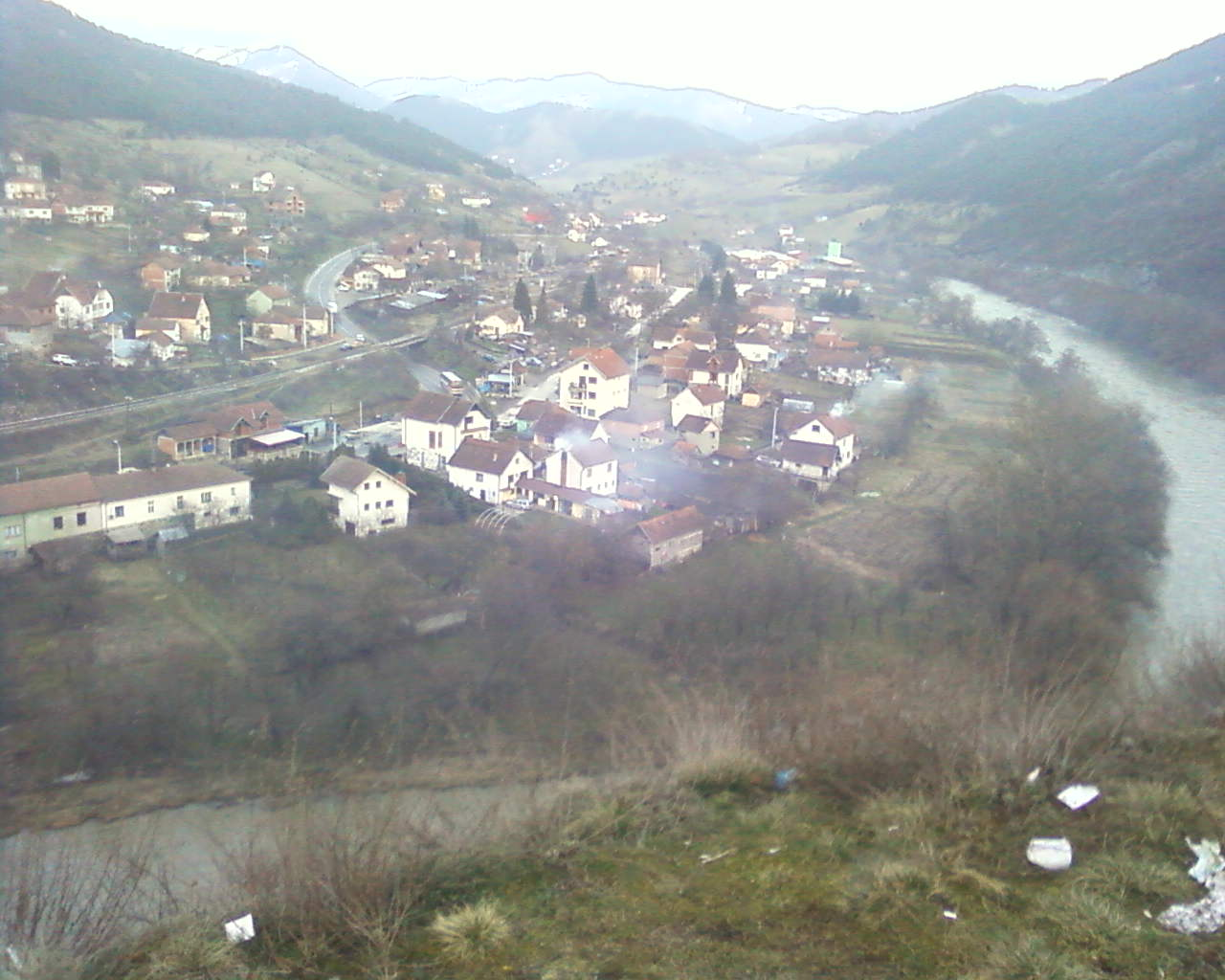
- photo of Kraljevo

- Location within Serbia
- Coordinates: 43°28′05″N 20°37′04″E
- Country: Serbia
- District: Raška District
- Municipality: Kraljevo

Area
  - Total: 20.15 km^{2} (7.78 sq mi)
- Elevation: 338 m (1,109 ft)

Population (2011)
  - Total: 1,881
  - Density: 93.35/km^{2} (241.8/sq mi)
- Time zone: UTC+1 (CET)
  - Summer (DST): UTC+2 (CEST)

Ušće (Serbian Cyrillic: Ушће) is a populated place in the town of Kraljevo in the Raska district. According to the 2011 census, there were 1,881 inhabitants.

== Demographics ==
There are 1621 adult inhabitants in the settlement of Ušće, and the average age of the population is 38.7 years (37.8 for men and 39.6 for women). There are 630 households in the settlement, and the average number of members per household is 3.24.

This place is largely inhabited by Serbs (according to the 2002 census), and in the last three censuses, an increase in population has been observed.
