= Badovinci =

Badovinci Бодовинци (Serbian)
- Village (Selo)
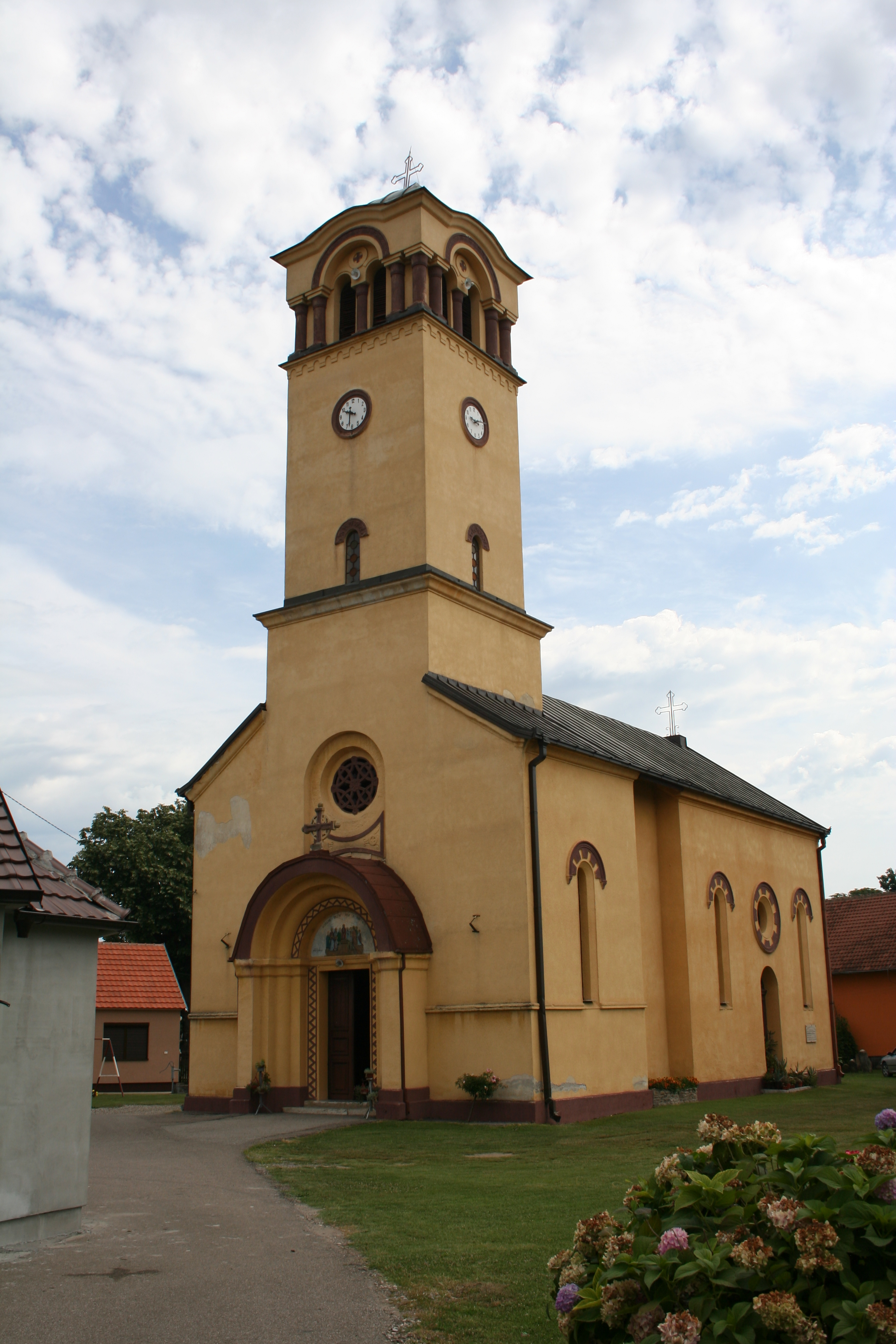

- Location within Serbia
- Coordinates: 44°47′N 19°22′E
- Country: Serbia
- Statistical Region: Šumadija and Western Serbia
- Region: Mačva
- District: Mačva District
- Municipality: Bogatić

Population (2022)
  - Total: 4,077
- Time zone: UTC+1 (CET)
  - Summer (DST): UTC+2 (CEST)

Badovinci (Serbian Cyrillic: Бадовинци, pronounced [badɔ̌v̞iːnt͡si]) is a village in Serbia. It is situated in the Bogatić municipality, in the Mačva District. The village has a Serb ethnic majority and its population numbering 4,077 people (2022 census).

== Name ==
The name of the settlement in Serbian is plural.

== See also ==
- List of places in Serbia
- Mačva
