= Gostun, Serbia =

Gostun Гостун
- Village
- Location within Serbia
- Coordinates: 43°11′20″N 19°45′19″E
- Country: Serbia
- District: Zlatibor District
- Municipality: Prijepolje

Area
  - Total: 3.83 km^{2} (1.48 sq mi)
- Elevation: 744 m (2,441 ft)

Population (2011)
  - Total: 64
  - Density: 17/km^{2} (43/sq mi)
- Time zone: UTC+1 (CET)
  - Summer (DST): UTC+2 (CEST)

Gostun (Serbian Cyrillic: Гостун) is a village located in the municipality of Prijepolje, Serbia. As of 2011 census, the village has a population of 64 inhabitants. During the Second World War a detachment of Muslim militia was established in this village, under command of Selim Juković.
