= Glogovac, Bogatić =

Glogovac Глоговац (Serbian)
- Village (Selo)
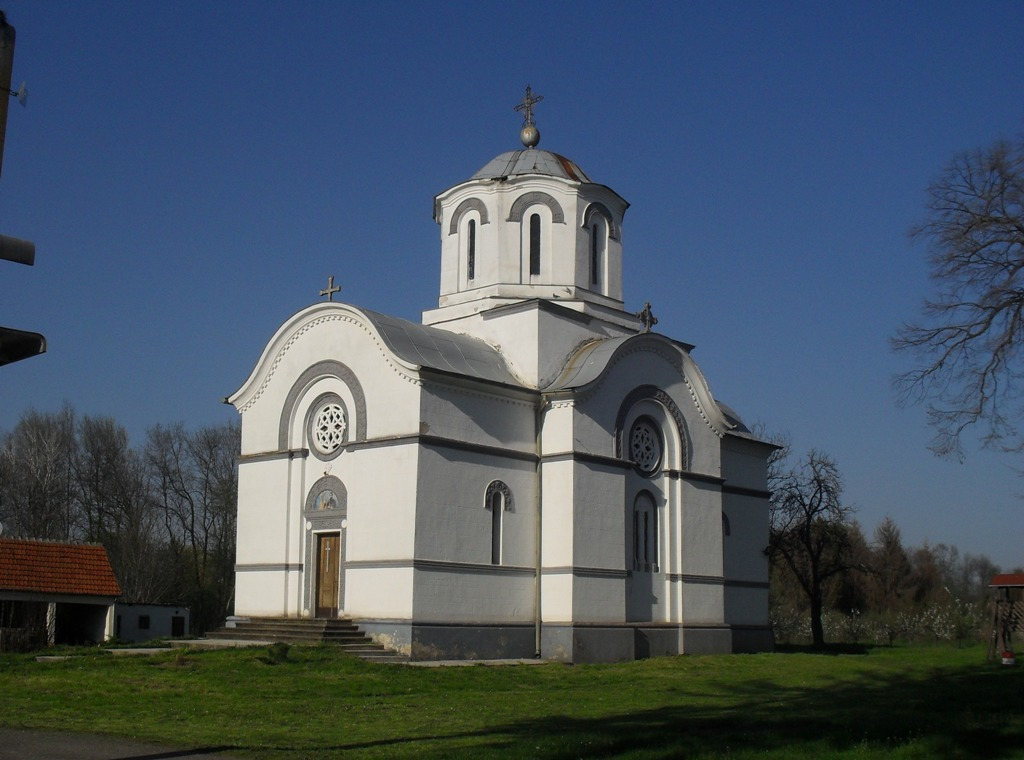

- Location within Serbia
- Coordinates: 44°51′49″N 19°24′58″E
- Country: Serbia
- Statistical Region: Šumadija and Western Serbia
- Region: Mačva
- District: Mačva District
- Municipality: Bogatić
- Time zone: UTC+1 (CET)
  - Summer (DST): UTC+2 (CEST)

Glogovac (Serbian Cyrillic: Глоговац [ɡlǒɡoʋats]) is a village in Serbia. It is situated in the Bogatić municipality, in the Mačva District. The village has a Serb ethnic majority and its population numbering 967 people (2002 census).

== See also ==
- List of places in Serbia
- Mačva
