= Mačvanski Prnjavor =

Mačvanski Prnjavor Мачвански Прњавор (Serbian)
- Village (Selo)
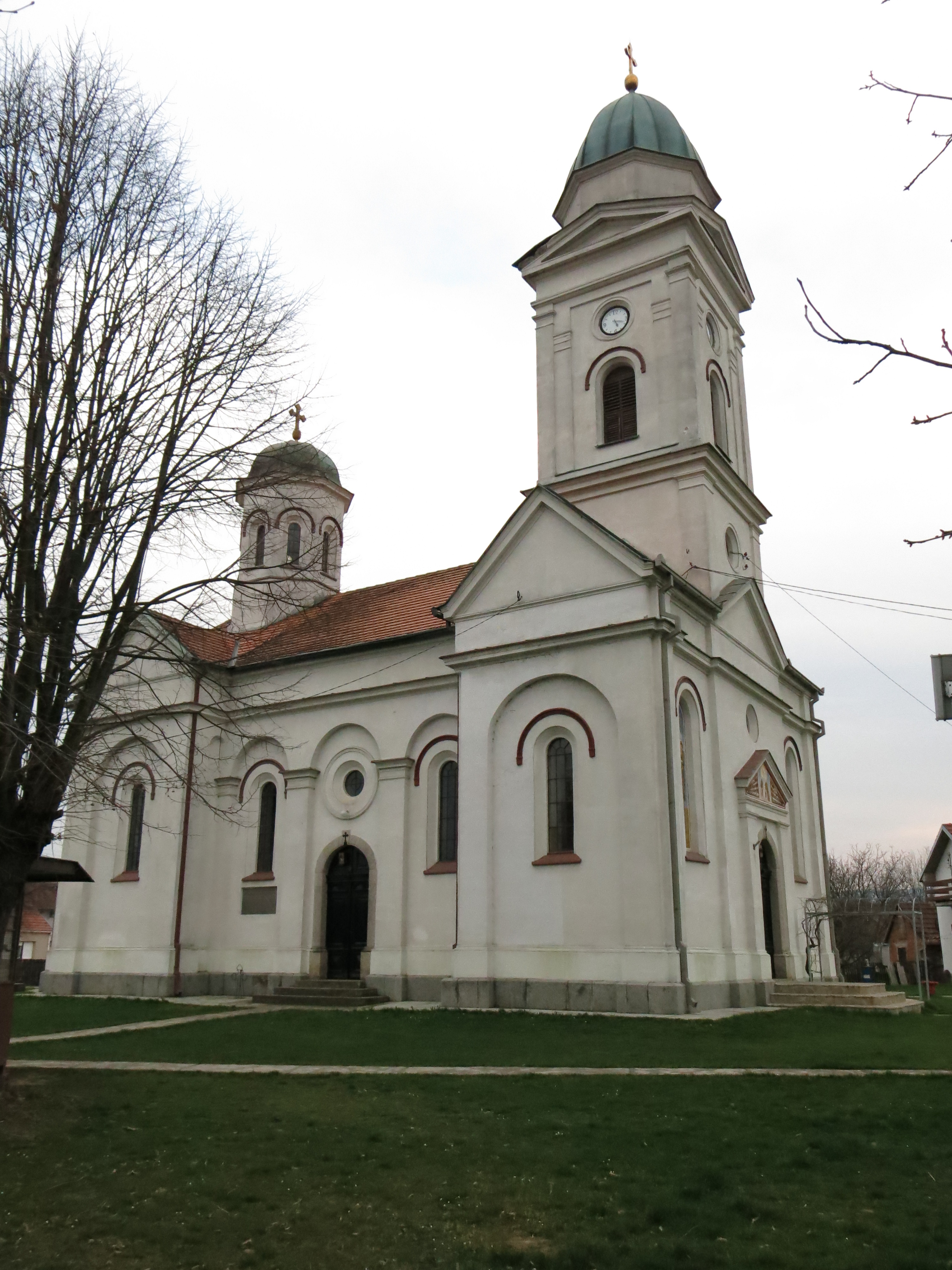

- Location within Serbia
- Coordinates: 44°41′34″N 19°23′11″E
- Country: Serbia
- District: Mačva District
- Municipality: Šabac

Population (2011)
  - Total: 3,906
- Time zone: UTC+1 (CET)
  - Summer (DST): UTC+2 (CEST)

Mačvanski Prnjavor (Serbian Cyrillic: Мачвански Прњавор) is a village in the municipality of Šabac, Serbia. According to the 2011 census, the village has a population of 3906 people.
