= Seleuš =

Seleuš Селеуш (Serbian) Seleuș (Romanian)
- Village (Selo)
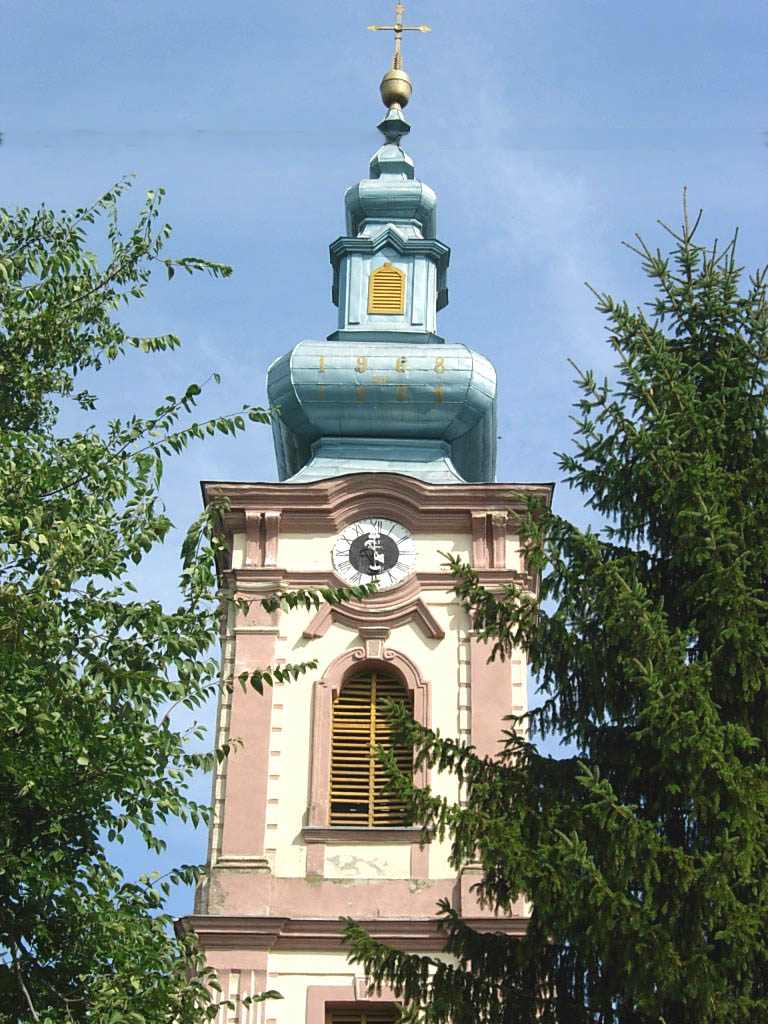
- The Romanian Orthodox church

- Location of Seleuš within Serbia Seleuš (Serbia) Seleuš (Europe)
- Coordinates: 45°07′46″N 20°54′50″E
- Country: Serbia
- Province: Vojvodina
- District: South Banat
- Municipality: Alibunar
- Elevation: 66 m (217 ft)

Population (2022)
  - Total: 1,009
- Time zone: UTC+1 (CET)
  - Summer (DST): UTC+2 (CEST)
- Postal code: 26351
- Area code: +381(0)13
- Car plates: PA

Seleuš (Serbian Cyrillic: Селеуш, Romanian: Seleuș) is a village located in the Alibunar municipality, South Banat District, Vojvodina, Serbia. The village has a population of 1,009 people (2022 census).

== Name ==
In Serbian, the village is known as Seleuš (Селеуш), in Romanian as Seleuș, in Croatian as Seleuš, in Hungarian as Keviszőlős, Kévisszöllö or Csigérszöllös, and in German as Selleusch.

== Demographics ==
=== Historical population ===
- 1961: 2,286
- 1971: 2,121
- 1981: 1,765
- 1991: 1,499
- 2002: 1,515
- 2011: 1,191
- 2022: 1,009

=== Ethnic groups ===
According to data from the 2022 census, ethnic groups in the village include:

- 479 (47.4%) Serbs
- 417 (41.3%) Romanians
- 68 (6.7%) Roma
- Others/Undeclared/Unknown
