= Kaona (Lučani) =

Kaona Каона
- Village
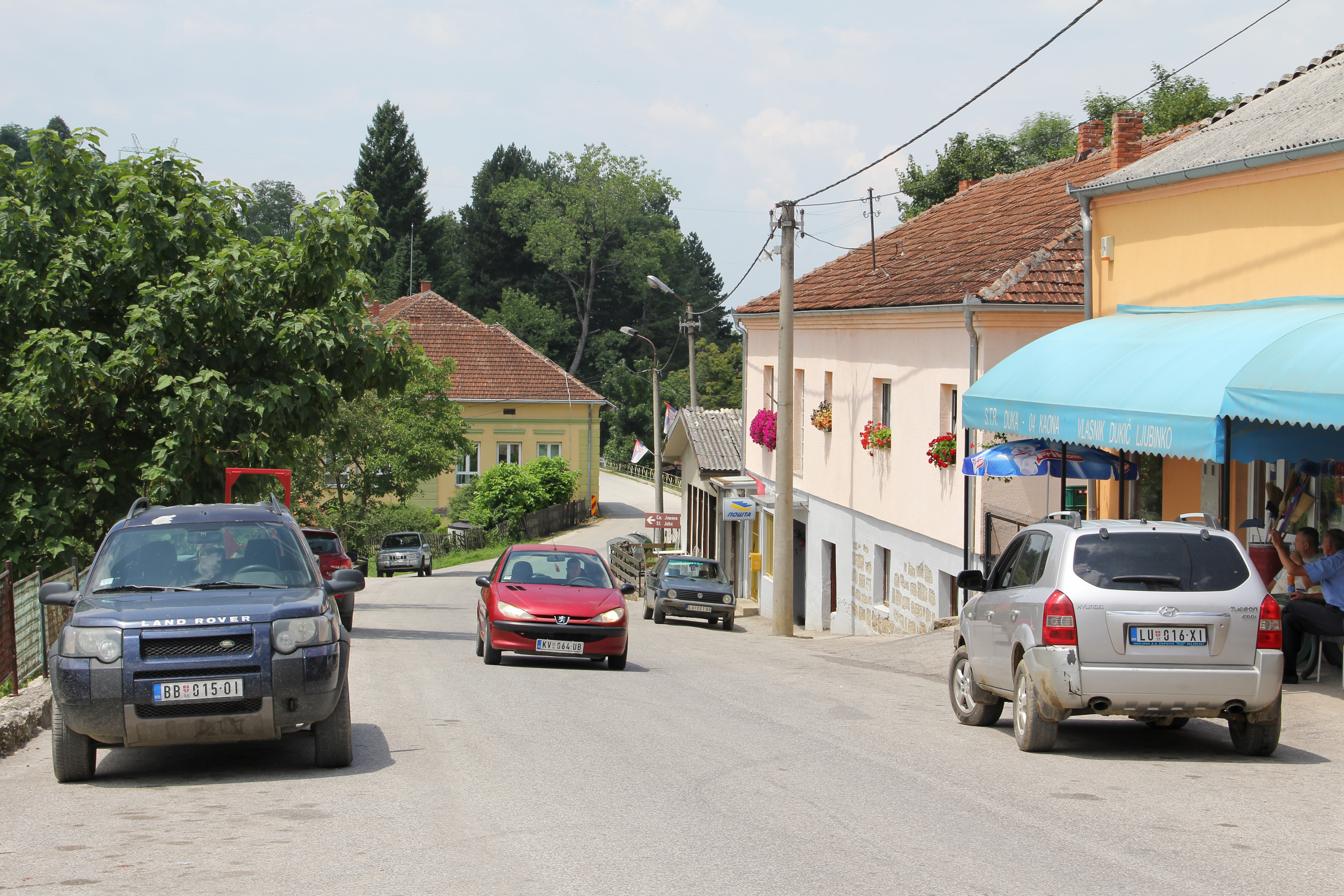
- Kaona, Lučani

- Location within Serbia
- Coordinates: 43°42′43″N 20°24′16″E
- Country: Serbia
- District: Moravica District
- Municipality: Lučani

Area
  - Total: 23.70 km^{2} (9.15 sq mi)
- Elevation: 551 m (1,808 ft)

Population (2011)
  - Total: 384
  - Density: 16.2/km^{2} (42.0/sq mi)
- Time zone: UTC+1 (CET)
  - Summer (DST): UTC+2 (CEST)

Kaona is a village in the municipality of Lučani, Serbia. According to the 2011 census, the village has a population of 384 people.
