= Radalj, Mali Zvornik =

Radalj Радаљ
- Village (Selo)
- Location within Serbia
- Coordinates: 44°24′12″N 19°11′00″E
- Country: Serbia
- Municipality: Mali Zvornik
- Time zone: UTC+1 (CET)
  - Summer (DST): UTC+2 (CEST)

Radalj (Serbian Cyrillic: Радаљ) is a village in Serbia. It is situated in the Mali Zvornik municipality, in the Mačva District of Central Serbia. The population of the village is 2,497 (2002 census) and it has an overall Serb ethnic majority.

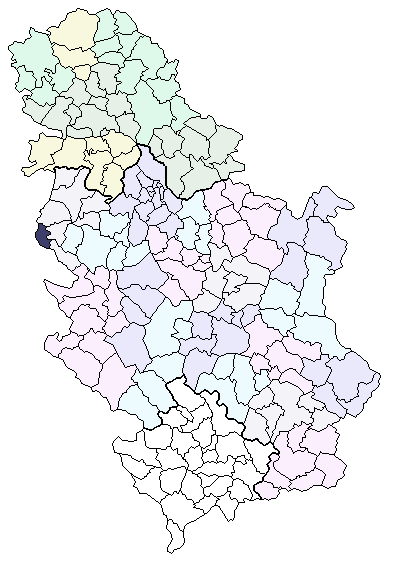
Location of the Mali Zvornik municipality in Serbia

== Historical population ==
- 1948: 1,901
- 1953: 2,189
- 1961: 2,590
- 1971: 2,502
- 1981: 2,342
- 1991: 2,497
- 2002: 1,731

Historical population
Year	Pop.	±%
1948	1,901	—
1953	2,189	+15.1%
1961	2,590	+18.3%
1971	2,502	−3.4%
1981	2,342	−6.4%
1991	2,574	+9.9%
2002	2,497	−3.0%
2011	2,211	−11.5%

== See also ==
- List of places in Serbia
