= Putevi Srbije =

Serbian road construction company

- Official logo
- Native name: Путеви Србије
- Company type: State-owned enterprise
- Industry: Construction
- Founded: 20 February 2006; 20 years ago (Current form)
- Headquarters: Bulevar kralja Aleksandra 282, Belgrade, Serbia
- Area served: Serbia
- Key people: Zoran Drobnjak (General director)
- Revenue: ▲€284.64 million (2019)
- Net income: ▲ (€142.11 million) (2019)
- Total assets: ▲€4.483 billion (2019)
- Total equity: ▼€3.055 billion (2019)
- Owner: Government of Serbia (100%)
- Number of employees: 1,881 (2019)
- Website: www.putevi-srbije.rs
- Footnotes / references Business ID: 20132248; Tax ID: 104260456

JP Putevi Srbije (Serbian: ЈП Путеви Србије) or Roads of Serbia, is a Serbian construction company headquartered in Belgrade, Serbia. It is the national road construction company of Serbia.

== Organization ==
Putevi Srbija was established by the Enactment of the Government of Serbia, as the state-owned enterprise responsible for "professional activities referring to permanent, continuous and good-quality maintenance and preservation, exploitation, construction, reconstruction, organization and control of toll collection, development and management of I and II category state roads in the Republic of Serbia". In current form, it operates since 20 February 2006.

Road network managed by "Putevi Srbije" consists of 16,844 km (10,466.38 mi) of I and II category state roads, valued at 4.483 billion euros as of December 2018.

As of December 2019, the total state roads network in Serbia is as follows:

- Ia category (motorways) – 962 km (597.76 mi)
- Ib category – 4,517 km (2,806.73 mi)
- IIa category – 7,903 km (4,910.70 mi)
- IIb category – 3,462 km (2,151.19 mi)

In January 2018, the Government of Serbia led by the Minister of Construction, Transportation and Infrastructure Zorana Mihajlović stated that the Government plans reorganization of "Putevi Srbije" and eventual merging of "Putevi Srbije" with specialized motorways construction company "Koridori Srbije".

== See also ==
- Roads in Serbia
- Motorways in Serbia
