= Bukor =

Bukor Букор (Serbian)
- Village (Selo)
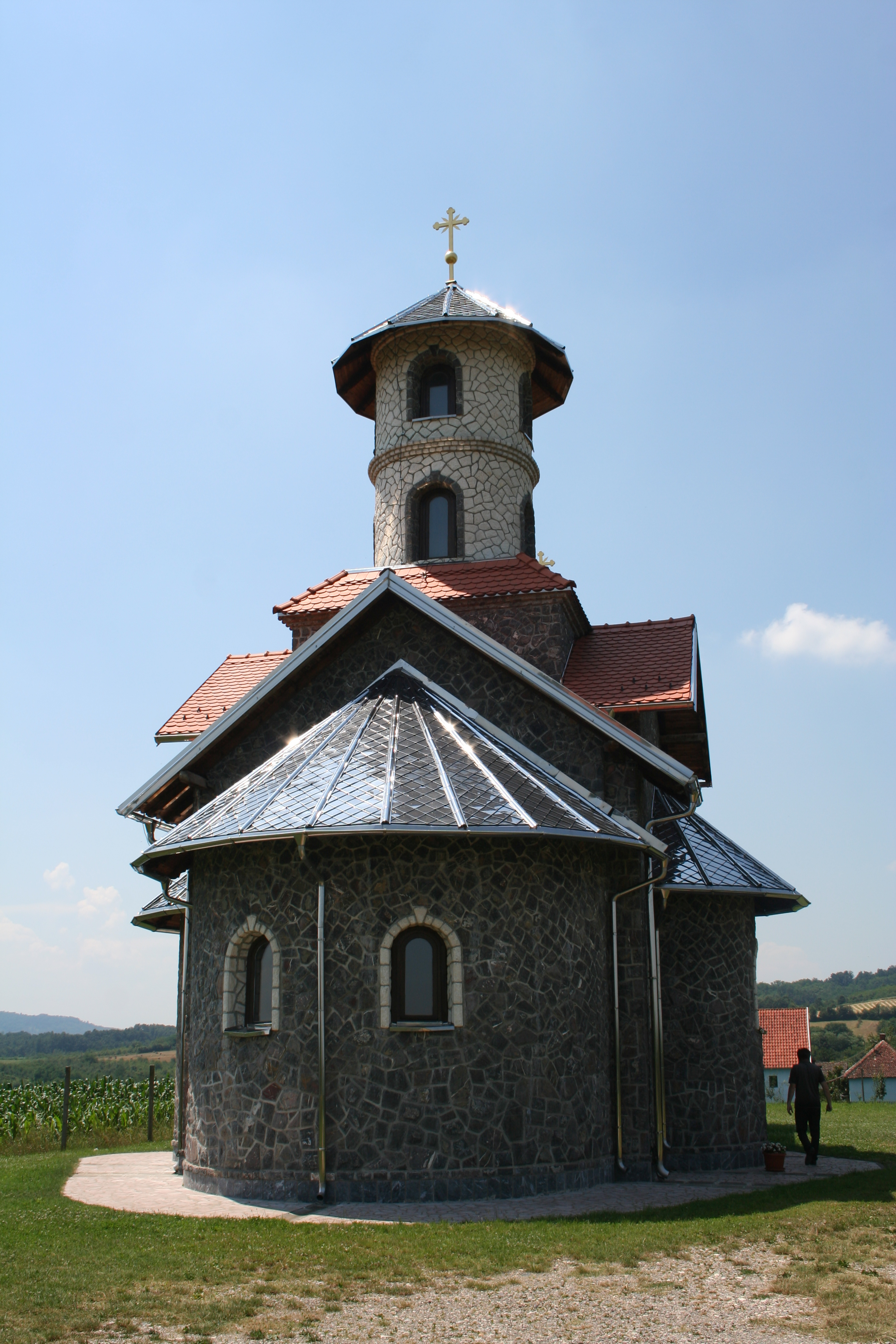

- Location within Serbia
- Coordinates: 44°30′00″N 19°35′29″E
- Country: Serbia
- District: Mačva District
- Municipality: Šabac

Population (2011)
  - Total: 620
- Time zone: UTC+1 (CET)
  - Summer (DST): UTC+2 (CEST)

Bukor (Serbian Cyrillic: Букор) is a village in the municipality of Šabac, Serbia. Its population dropped from 818 in 2002 to 620 in 2011.

According to the 2011 census the average age in the village is 46.8.
