= Dušan Ninić =

Serbian novelist

- Born: September 6, 1956; Zaječar, Serbia
- Occupation: Novelist
- Website: www.ninicninic.com

Dušan Ninić (Serbian Cyrillic: Душан Нинић) (born September 6, 1956, in Zaječar, Serbia) is a Serbian novelist.

== Biography ==
Ninić grew up in Šabac, Serbia, where he completed elementary school. In 1972, his family moved back to Zaječar, where he finished high school. He studied at the Belgrade Law School, and later obtained his degree from the University of Niš.

Ninić spent his career working for Zaječar Brewery, finishing as CEO in 2007.

He started writing relatively late in life, as a side activity to his business career. He published his first novel, The Revelation, in 2003. By 2010, it had sold several thousand copies, in four editions.

Ninić published his second novel, The Revelation 2 (Serbian:"Saznanje"), in 2007, with a second edition appearing in 2010. His third novel, The Revelation 3 (Serbian:"Spoznaja"), was published in 2010.

Ninić's novels are mostly philosophical and political texts, in a manner that draws on magical realism, Alexandrian syncretism, special war theories and neuro-linguistic programming. In his writing, Ninić manages not only to combine these disparate theories but prove the connections they share as well. The author does so through the dialogues among the characters who inhabit these fantastic novels — “in order for the reader to accept and understand them in an easier way,” Ninić himself explains.

== Works ==
- The Revelation, 2003.
- The Revelation 2, 2007.
- The Revelation 3, 2010.
