= Cerovac (Šabac) =

Cerovac Церовац (Serbian)
- Village (Selo)
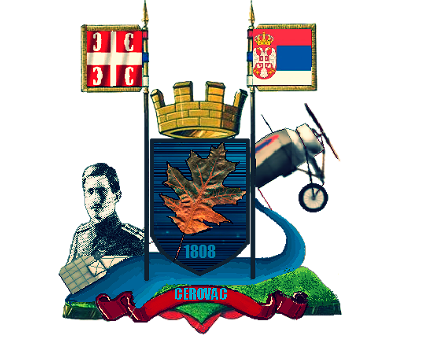

- Location within Serbia
- Coordinates: 44°40′31″N 19°44′37″E
- Country: Serbia
- District: Mačva District
- Municipality: Šabac

Government
  - Type: Mesna zajednica
  - Predsednik: Marko Timotic

Population (2002)
  - Total: 479
- Time zone: UTC+1 (CET)
  - Summer (DST): UTC+2 (CEST)
- Postal code: 15224

Cerovac (Serbian Cyrillic: Церовац) is a village in the municipality of Šabac, Serbia. According to the 2002 census, the village has a population of 479 people.
