= Jevremovac (Šabac) =

Coordinates: 44.7208°N 19.6639°E

Jevremovac Јевремовац (Serbian)
- Village (Selo)
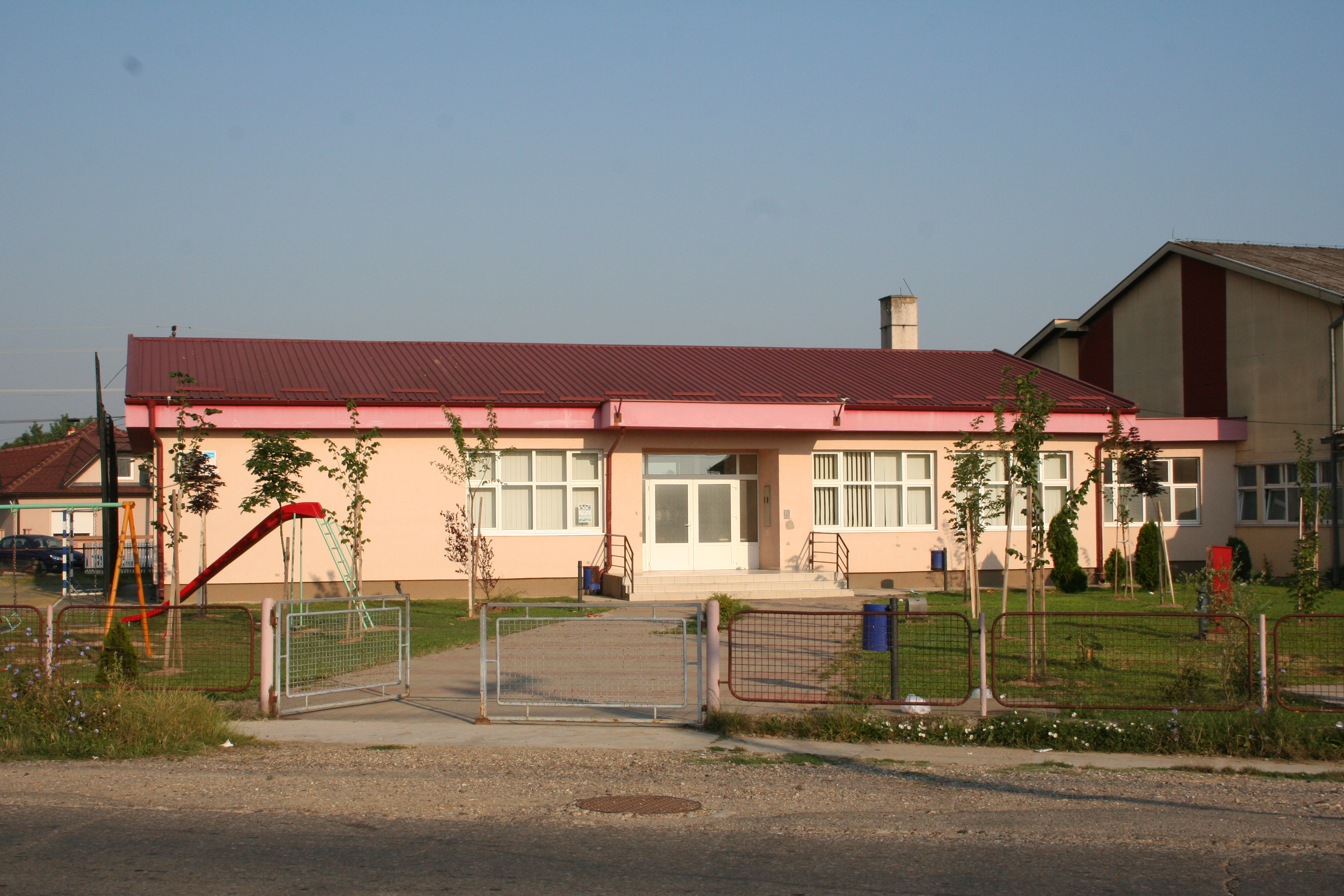
- Interactive map of Jevremovac
- Country: Serbia
- District: Mačva District
- Municipality: Šabac

Population (2002)
  - Total: 3,310
- Time zone: UTC+1 (CET)
  - Summer (DST): UTC+2 (CEST)

Jevremovac (Serbian Cyrillic: Јевремовац) is a town in the municipality of Šabac, Serbia. According to the 2002 census, the town has a population of 3310 people.
