= Skrađani =

Skrađani Скрађани (Serbian)
- Village (Selo)
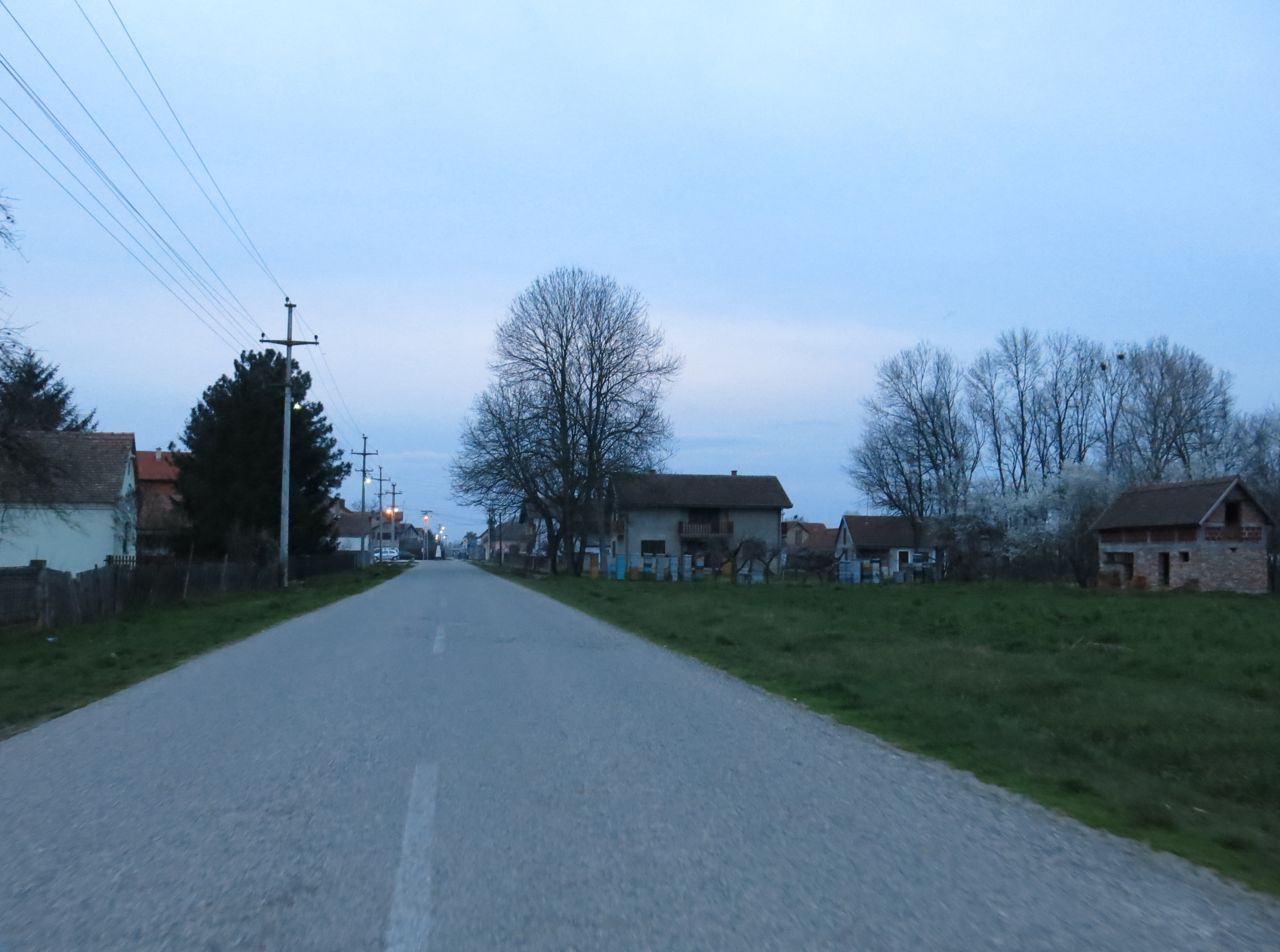

- Location within Serbia
- Coordinates: 44°45′N 19°29′E
- Country: Serbia
- Time zone: UTC+1 (CET)
  - Summer (DST): UTC+2 (CEST)

Skrađani (Serbian Cyrillic: Скрађани) is a village in Serbia. It is situated in the Šabac municipality, in the Mačva District. The village has a Serb ethnic majority and its population numbering 454 people (2002 census).

== See also ==
- List of places in Serbia
- Mačva
