= Šabac =

Šabac Шабац (Serbian)
- City
- Grad Šabac; Град Шабац; City of Šabac
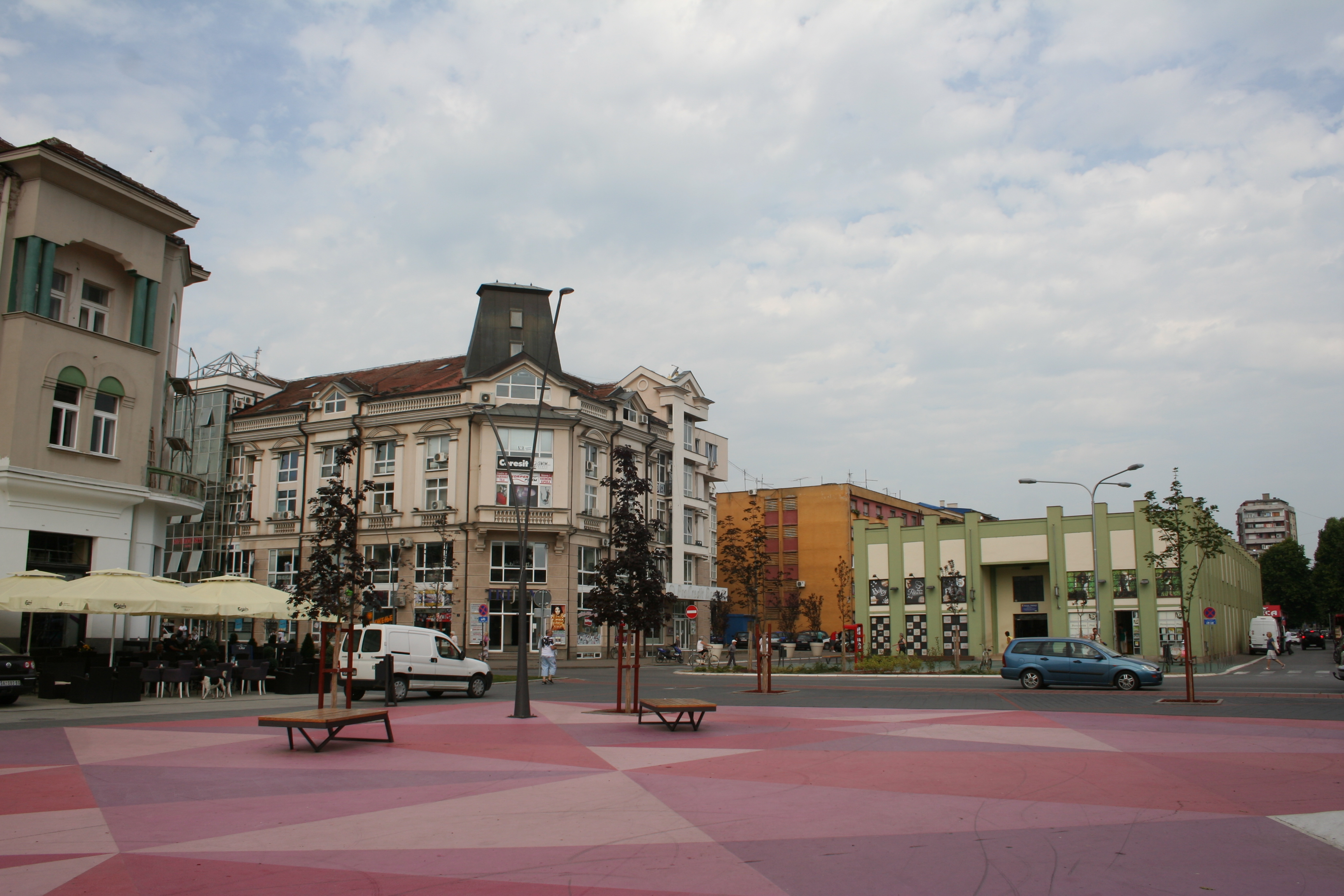
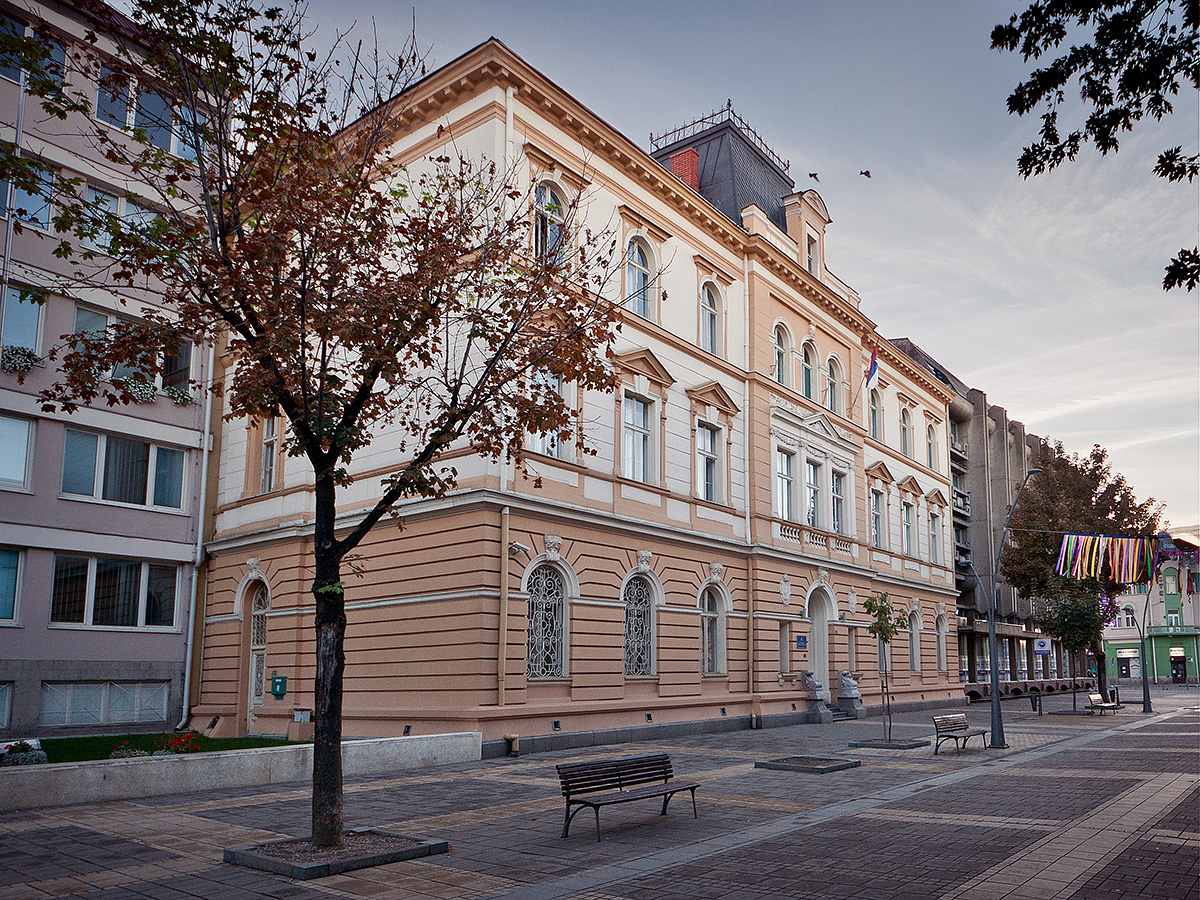
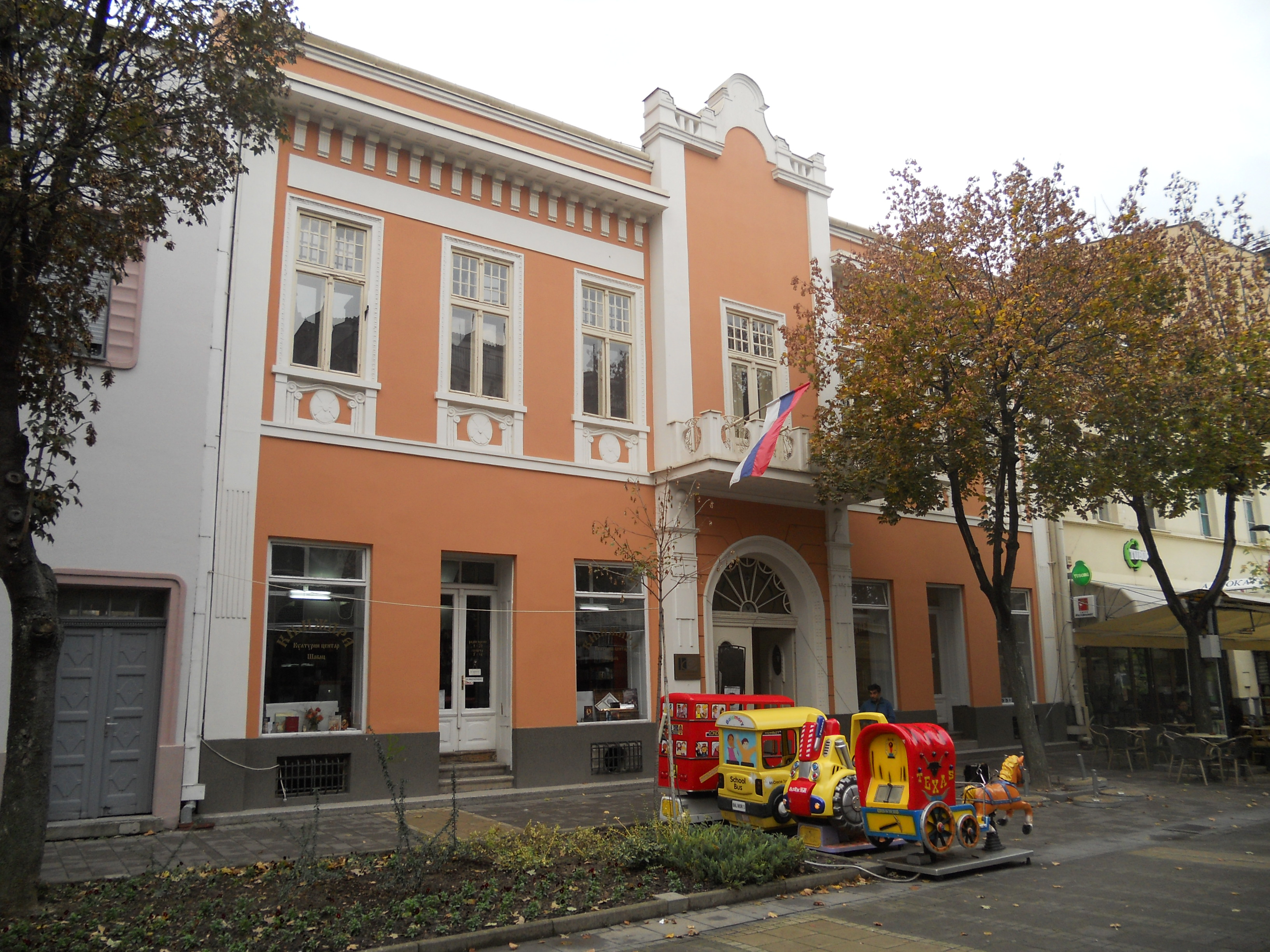
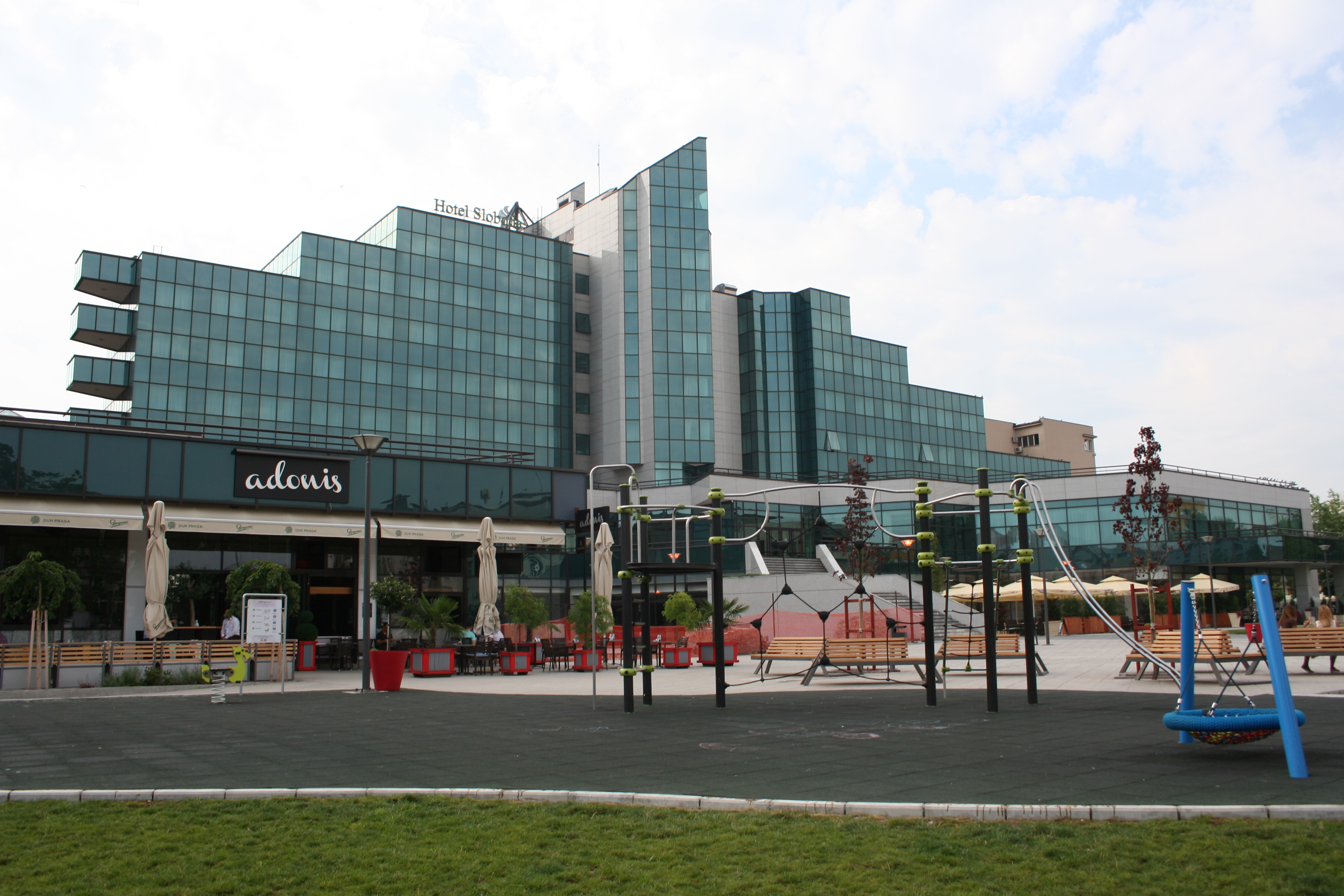
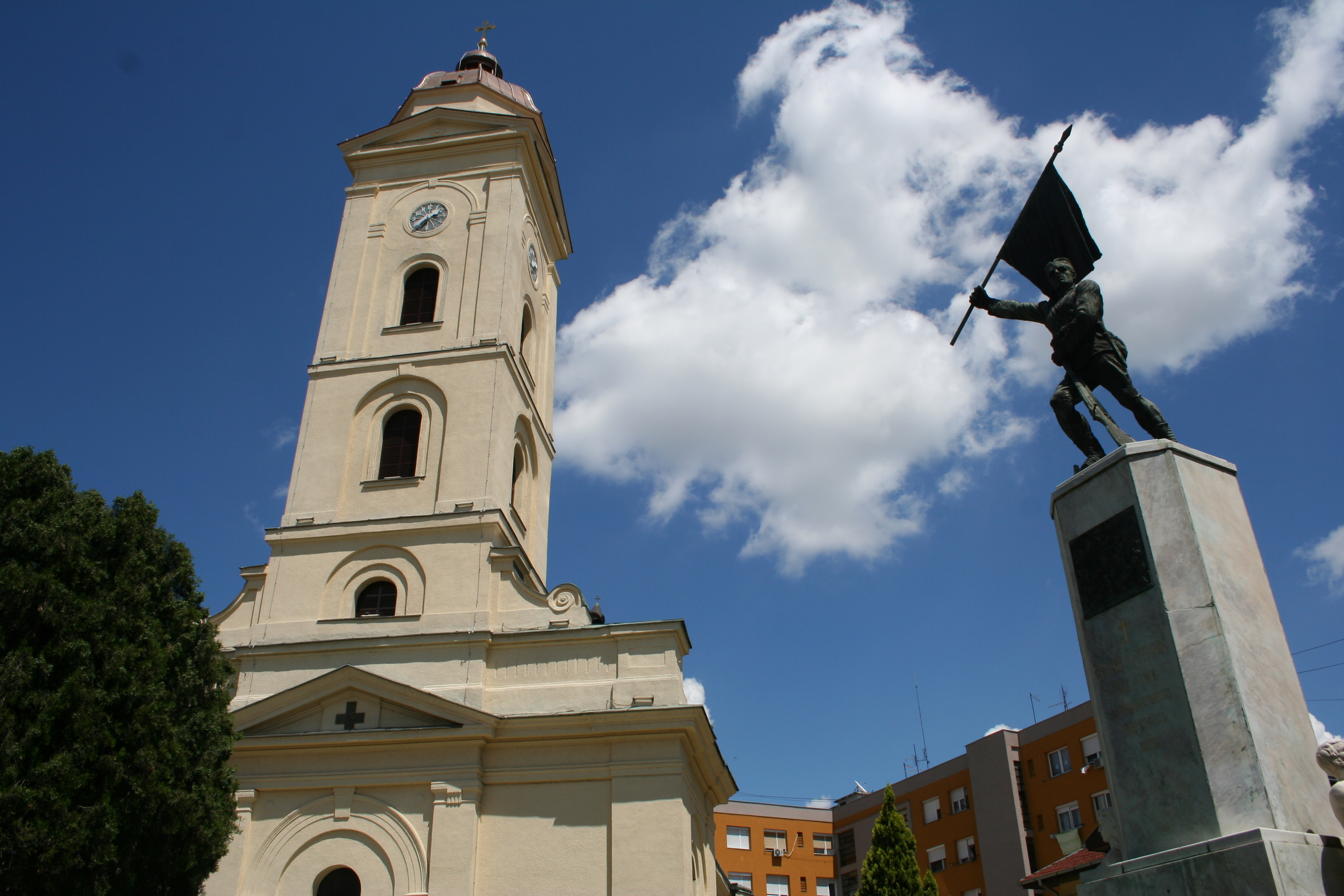
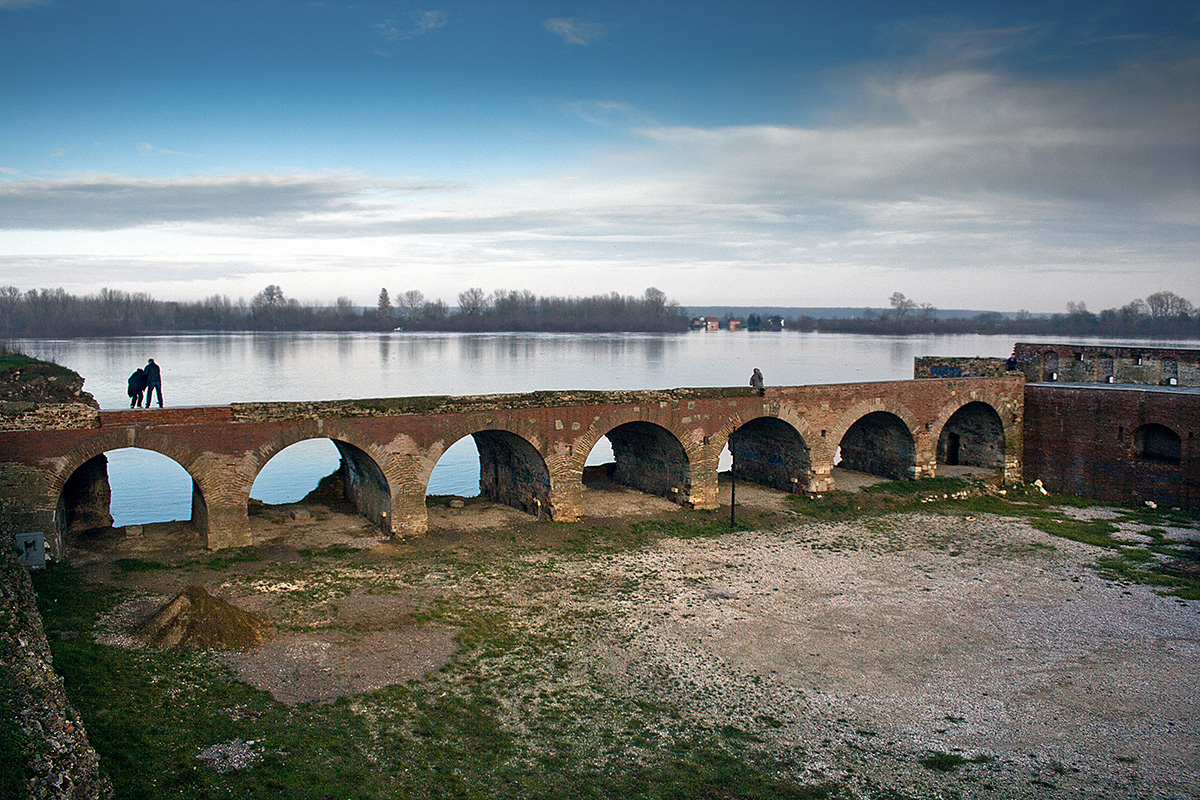
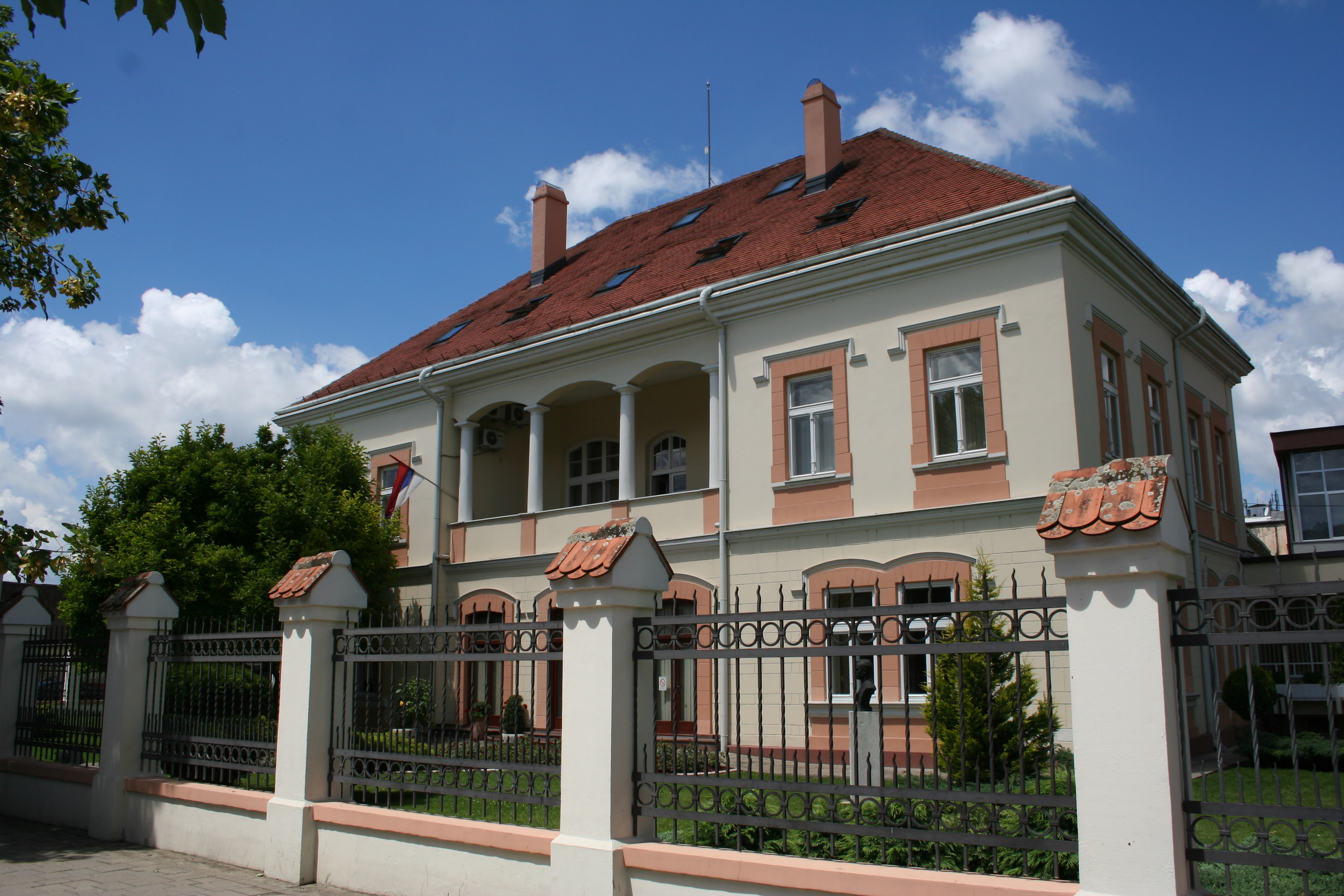
- Šabac City Square Šabac Courthouse Šabac Cultural Centre Hotel "Sloboda" Church of St. Peter and St. Paul Šabac Fortress Šabac Library

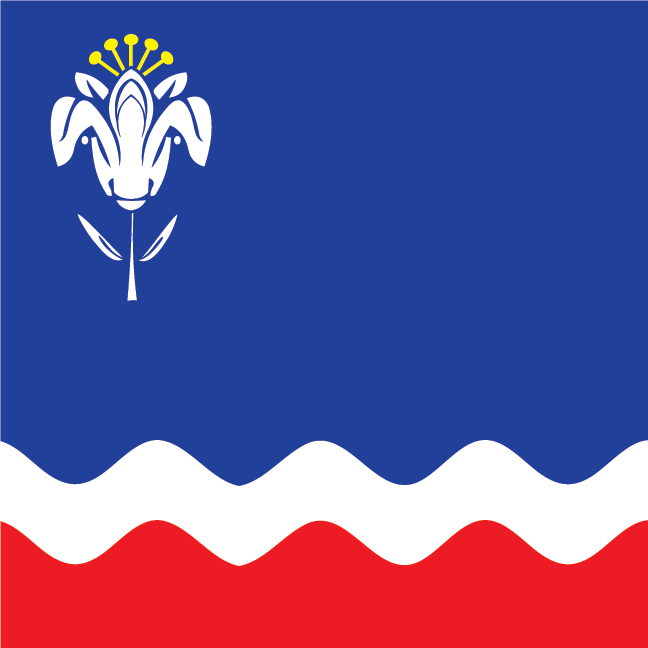
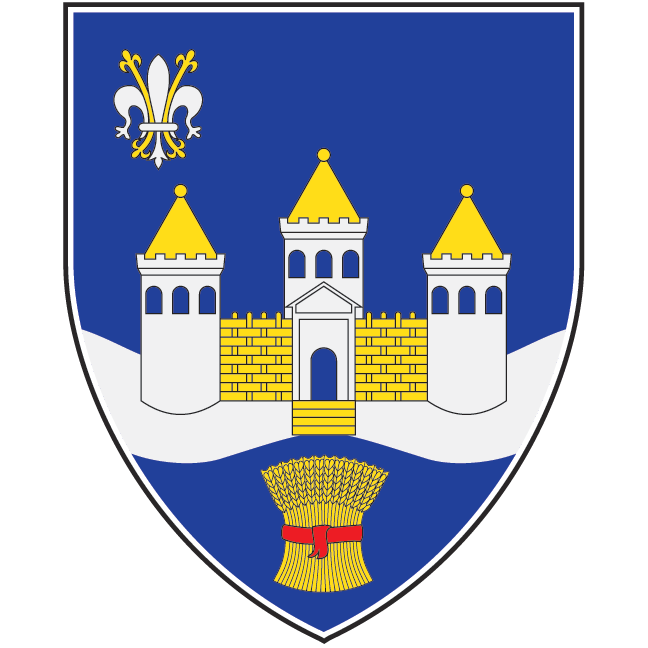
- Flag Coat of arms

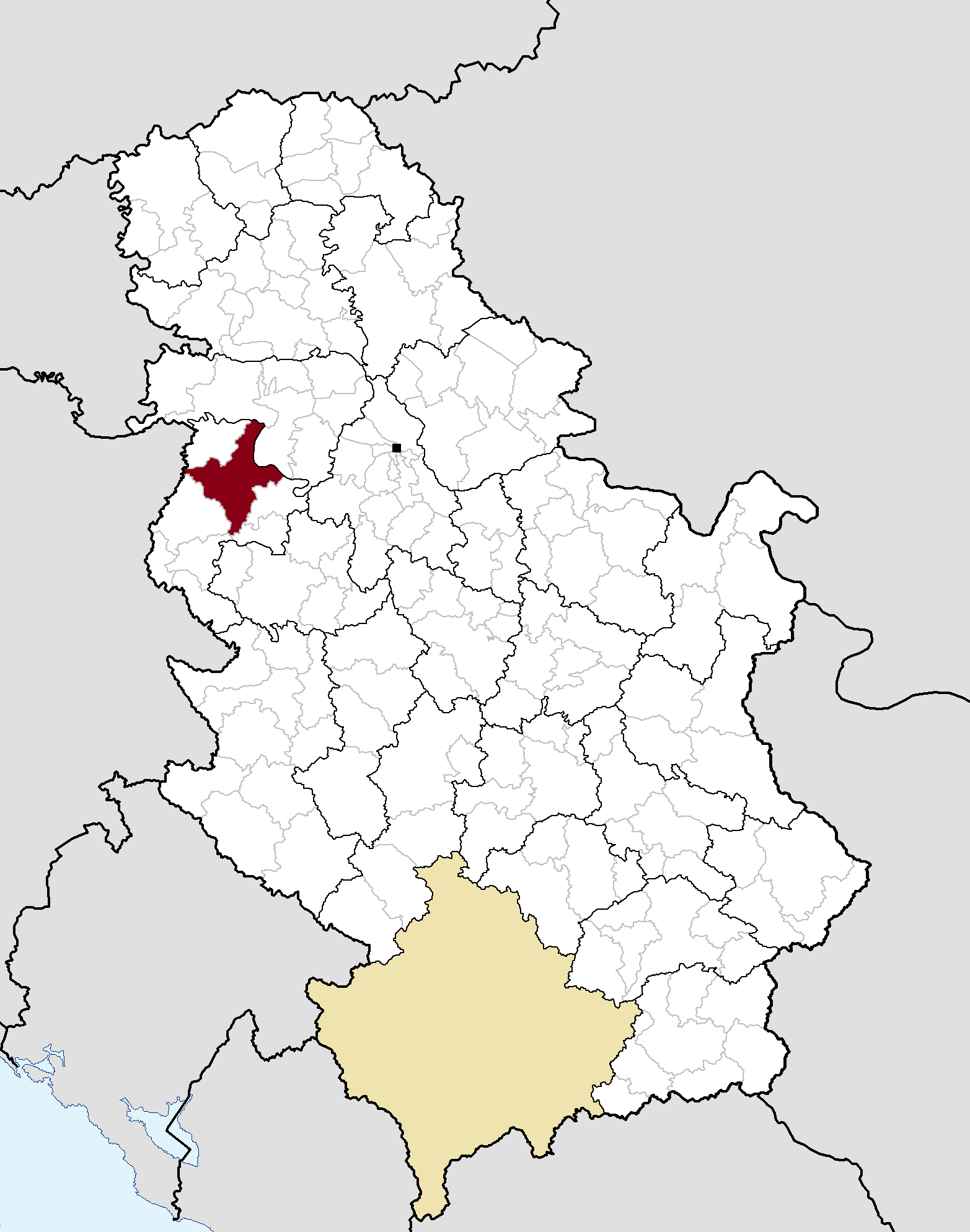
- Location of the city of Šabac within Serbia
- Coordinates: 44°45′N 19°42′E
- Country: Serbia
- Statistical Region: Šumadija and Western Serbia
- Region: Mačva
- District: Mačva District
- Municipality: Šabac
- Settlements: 52

Government
  - Mayor: Aleksandar Pajić (SNS)
  - Deputy Mayor: Milan Mačvan (Ind.)
  - Ruling parties: SNS/ZS/ZS

Area
  - Rank: 25th in Serbia
  - Urban: 30.89 km^{2} (11.93 sq mi)
  - Administrative: 795 km^{2} (307 sq mi)
- Elevation: 83 m (272 ft)

Population (2022 census)
  - Rank: 13th in Serbia
  - Urban: 51,163
  - Urban density: 1,656/km^{2} (4,290/sq mi)
  - Administrative: 105,432
  - Administrative density: 133/km^{2} (343/sq mi)
- Time zone: UTC+1 (CET)
  - Summer (DST): UTC+2 (CEST)
- Postal code: 15000
- Area code: +381(0)15
- Vehicle registration: ŠA
- Official languages: Serbian
- Climate: Cfb
- Website: www.sabac.org

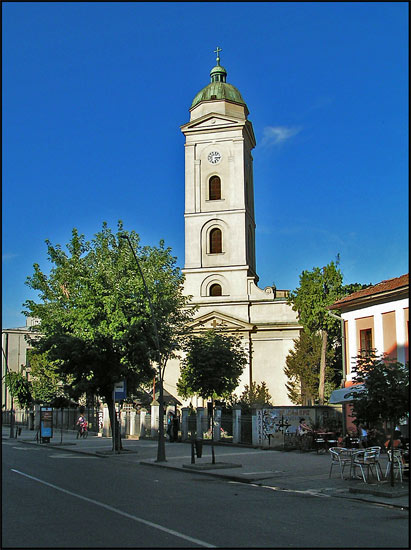
Serbian Orthodox church, Central Šabac

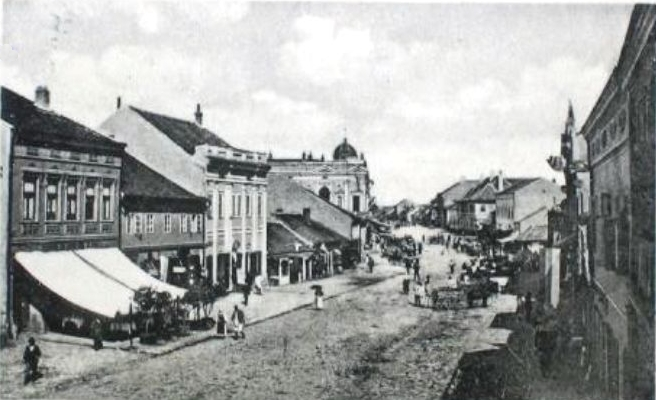
Šabac, Kingdom of Serbia, 1904

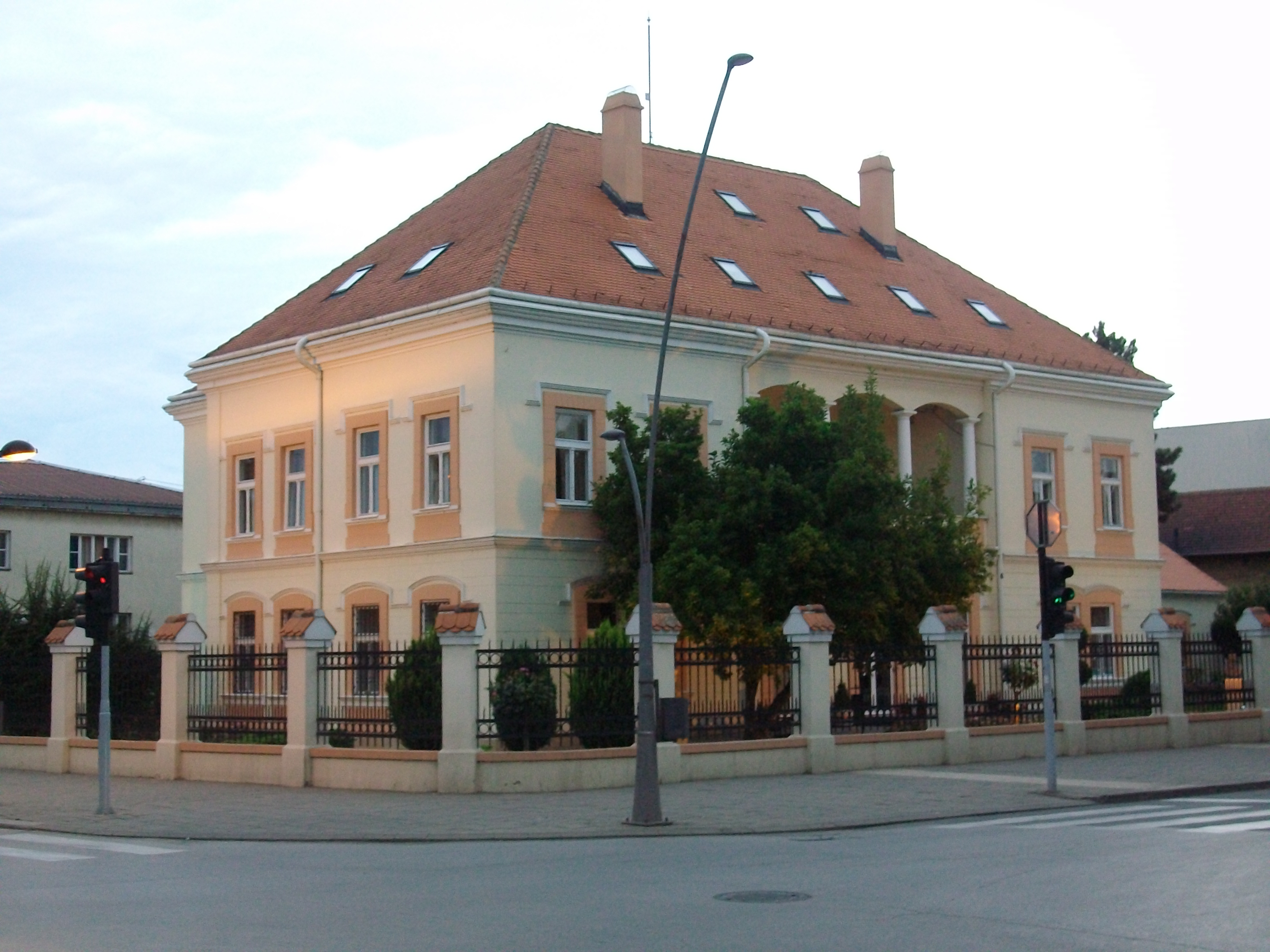
Šabac library

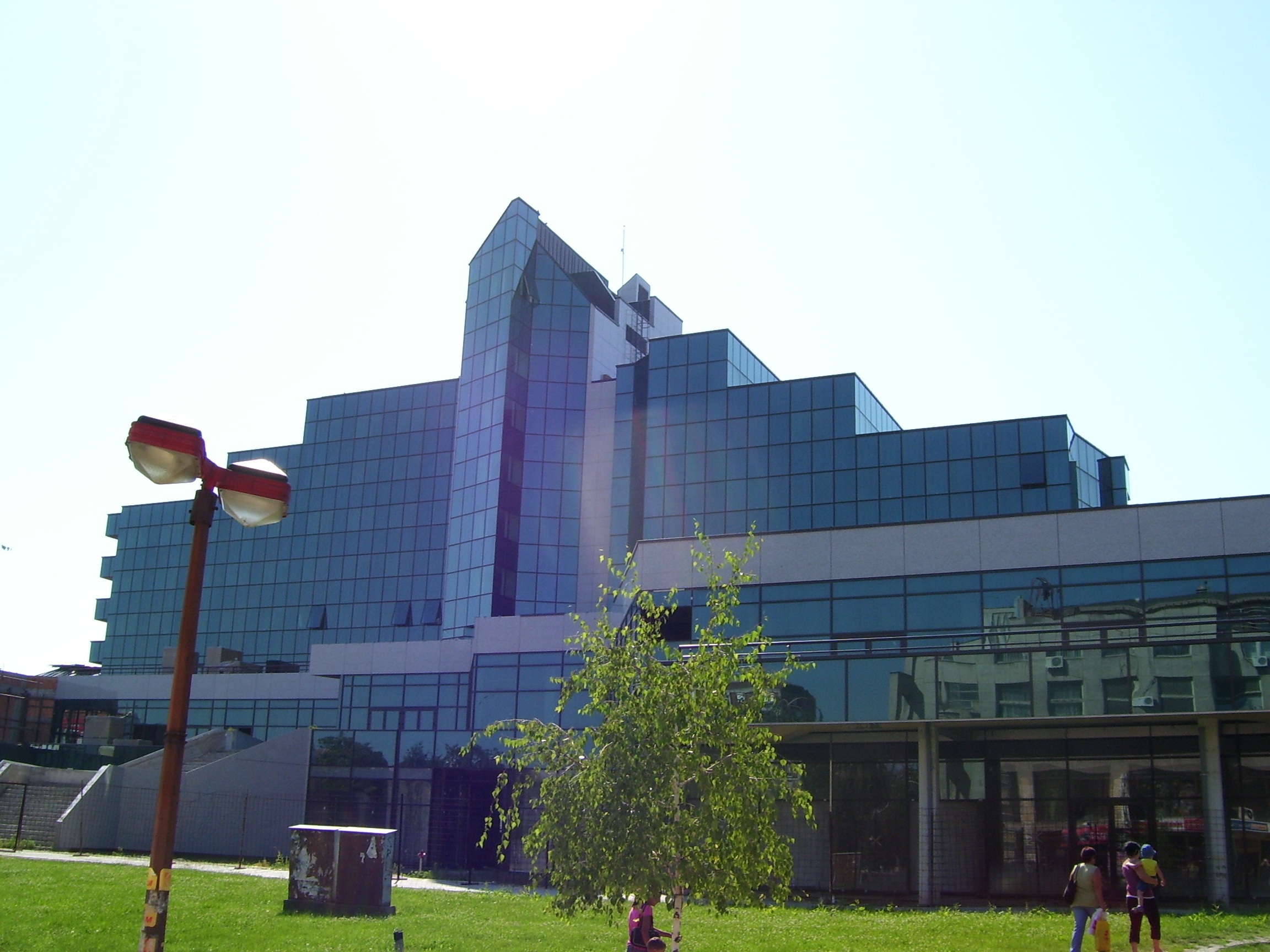
Hotel in Šabac

Šabac (Serbian Cyrillic: Шабац, pronounced [ʃâbat͡s]) is a city and the administrative centre of the Mačva District in western Serbia. The traditional centre of the fertile Mačva region, Šabac is located on the right bank of the river Sava. According to the 2022 census, the city proper has a population of 51,163, while its administrative area comprises 105,432 inhabitants.

== Name ==
The name Šabac was first mentioned in Ragusan documents dating to 1454. The origin of the city's name is uncertain; it is possible its name comes from the name of the city's main river, the Sava. The city is known by a variety of different names: Zaslon in medieval Serbian, Szabács in Hungarian, Böğürdelen in Turkish, and Schabatz in German.

== History ==
Archaeological evidence attests to more permanent settlement in the area from the Neolithic. In the Middle Ages, a Slavic settlement named Zaslon existed at the current location of Šabac. The settlement was part of the Serbian Despotate until it fell to the Ottoman Empire in 1459.

In 1470, the Ottomans built the first fortress in the town and named it Beyerdelen (Böğürdelen, meaning "side-striker"). In 1476 the Hungarian king Matthias Corvinus captured the fort; it remained under administration of the Kingdom of Hungary until 1521, when it was again captured by the Ottomans. Under Hungarian administration, the town was part of the Banate of Macsó, whereas under Ottoman administration it was firstly part of the Sanjak of Zvornik within the Province of Bosnia, and later part of the Sanjak of Smederevo. Šabac was the administrative centre of the nahiye of Šabac, a local Ottoman administrative unit. During the Ottoman period, Šabac was a typical oriental town with tiny streets, small shops and several mosques. The population was composed of both Muslims and Serbs, along with smaller numbers of Hungarians and Croats.

Until the 19th century, Šabac was mostly under Ottoman administration, but control of the town changed hands several times between the Ottoman Empire and the Habsburg monarchy during the Ottoman-Habsburg wars. The first period of Habsburg rule began in 1718, when Šabac was incorporated into the Habsburg Kingdom of Serbia. After the Treaty of Belgrade (1739), Šabac reverted to Ottoman control and, straddling the boundary between the two empires, it gained importance as a market town. A second period of Habsburg control of the area followed starting in 1789. The storming of the city was one of the early experiences of the renowned military leader Józef Poniatowski. Ottoman control over the area was restored a few years later.

Šabac became a site of importance in Serbian history in the First Serbian Uprising when, in 1806, Karađorđe led the Serbian insurgents into one of the first victories over the Ottoman army near the nearby village of Mišar. Until 1813, the town was part of Revolutionary Serbia. A brief period of restored Ottoman control followed, but after the Second Serbian Uprising in 1815, Šabac was included into the now-autonomous Principality of Serbia under the Obrenović dynasty. This first ruling family of modern Serbia left its mark on the town; knez Miloš Obrenović's brother, the enlightened Jevrem Obrenović, built a personal residence and helped modernise the town: the period from 1820 to 1850 saw the establishment of a hospital, a pharmacy, a Serbian grammar school, a gymnasium, a theatre, and a musical society.

The Ottoman army evacuated the fort of Šabac in 1867, marking the end of the Ottoman presence in the area. The first newspaper in the Kingdom of Serbia was printed in Šabac in 1883, and the town was also the first in Serbia where women started visiting kafanas (pubs) on Sunday afternoons, as was customary for men.

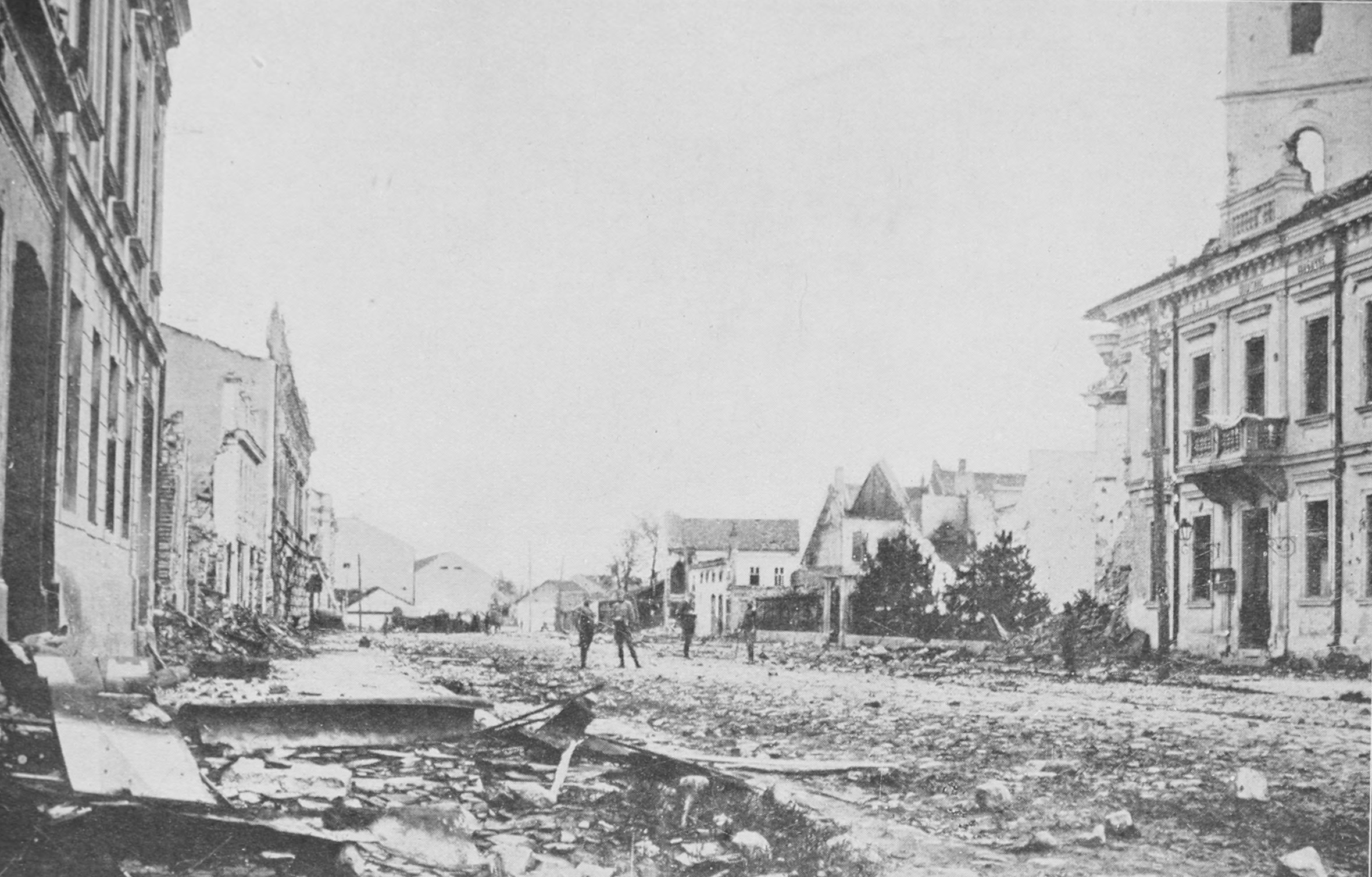
Šabac, on the river Sava, which was the then northern border of Serbia with Austria-Hungary, was badly damaged by Austro-Hungarian bombardment and street fighting in 1914

The town prospered until the First World War, when it was occupied and devastated by the Austro-Hungarian army and had its population halved (from cca. 14,000 to 7,000) on the orders of Kasimir von Lütgendorf, despite the fact that the Royal Serbian Army evacuated the town without resistance. Lütgendorf later ordered three of his own soldiers to be publicly executed by bayonet in the town square for drunkenly discharging their rifles despite orders from his superior Karl Tersztyánszky von Nádas to stop, leading to him being court-martialed and convicted for murder after the war in 1920. World War I is also remembered for the battle on nearby Cer mountain where the Serbian army under general Stepa Stepanović won an early victory against Austria-Hungary in August 1914, the first Allied victory in the war. After the war, Šabac was decorated with the French War Cross with Palm (1920), the Czechoslovak War Cross (1925), and the Order of the Karađorđe's Star with Swords (1934).

In 1918, the town became a part of the newly formed Kingdom of Serbs, Croats and Slovenes (later renamed to Yugoslavia). From 1918 to 1922, it was the administrative seat of Podrinje District, from 1922 to 1929 the administrative seat of Podrinje Oblast, and from 1929 to 1941 it was a part of the Drina Banovina. An early milestone in the Yugoslav era of the town's history was the opening of the Zorka chemical plant in 1938. The city's renewal was interrupted by World War II and occupation by German troops (from 1941 to 1944). During the Axis occupation of Yugoslavia, Šabac was part of the area governed by the Military Administration in Serbia. Its population of 1,200 Jews were arrested and ended in the ill-fated Kladovo transport. During the Uprising in Serbia the united rebel forces of the Yugoslav Army in the Fatherland, forces of the Communist Party of Yugoslavia and Pećanac Chetniks attacked German garrison in Šabac in an event known as Attack on Šabac, but failed to capture the town. In the German and Croatian Ustaše retributions 1,130 civilians were executed, 21,500 imprisoned and most of the populated places in Mačva were completely burned down. Eventually, 7,000 inmates were killed. The city was liberated from occupation by the Yugoslav Partisans in 1944. After the war, it was included into People's Republic of Serbia within the new socialist Yugoslavia. Since then, it grew into a modern industrial city with the aforementioned Zorka chemical plant and an expanded population. The 1970s saw the construction of the first modern sports hall. The swamp at the city's outskirts, Benska Bara, was drained and turned into a residential neighborhood, and a new bridge was built over the Sava river. By 2010, the population of the city and its suburbs had risen to 75,000.

== Demographics ==
Historical population
Year	Pop.	±%
1948	16,243	—
1953	19,894	+22.5%
1961	30,352	+52.6%
1971	42,075	+38.6%
1981	52,177	+24.0%
1991	54,637	+4.7%
2002	55,163	+1.0%
2011	53,919	−2.3%
2022	51,163	−5.1%

According to the 2022 census results, the city of Šabac has a population of 105,432 inhabitants.

=== Ethnic groups ===
The ethnic composition of the city of Šabac (as of 2011 census):

Ethnic group	Population	%
Serbs	110,642	95.48%
Roma	1,902	1.64%
Muslims	393	0.34%
Croats	165	0.14%
Yugoslavs	123	0.11%
Others	2,659	2.29%
Total	115,884	

== Local communities ==
=== Rural local communities ===
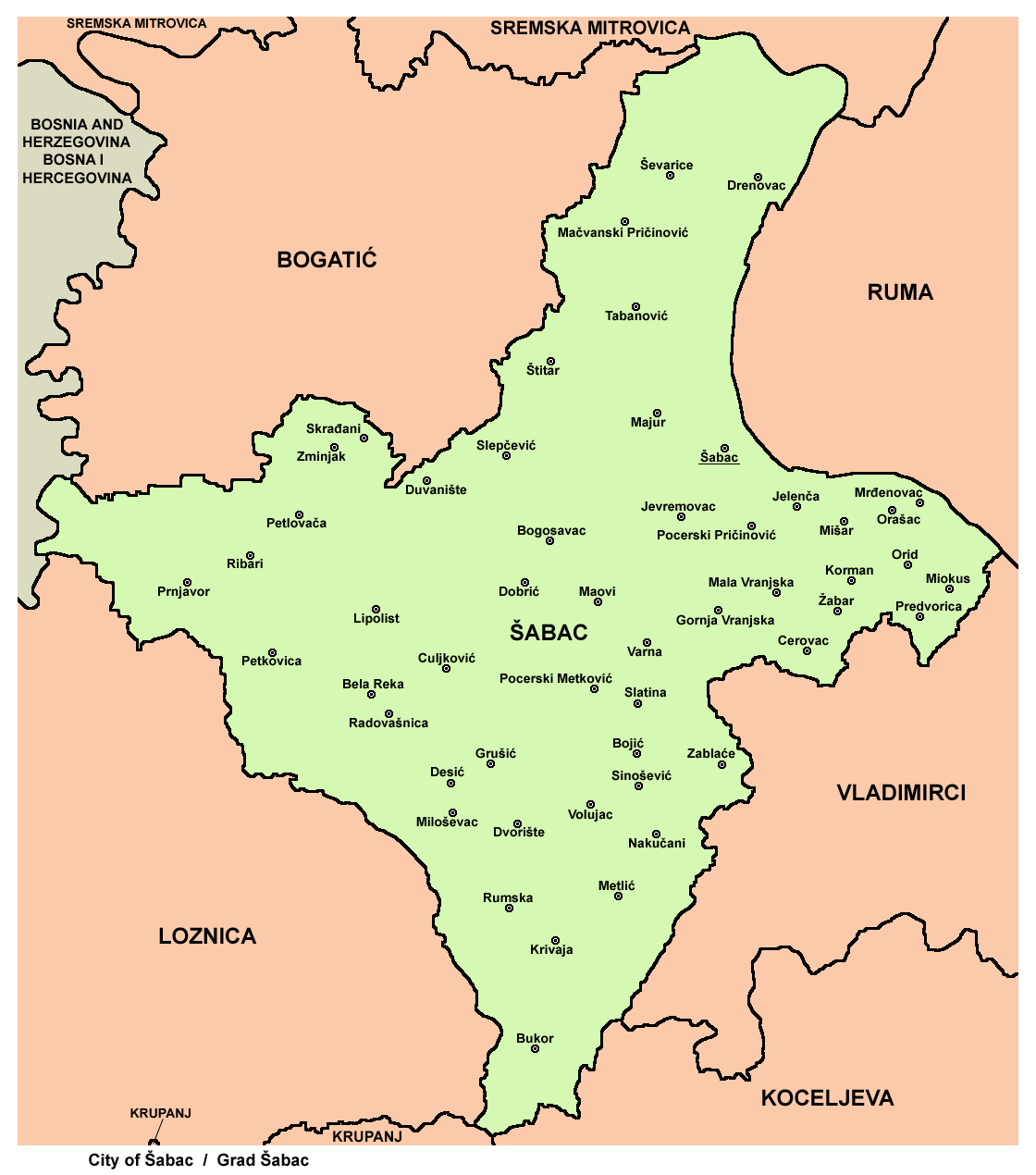
Map of the city of Šabac

- Bela Reka
- Bogatić
- Bogosavac
- Bojić
- Bukor
- Varna
- Volujac
- Gornja Vranjska
- Gornja Rumska
- Grušić
- Dvorište
- Desić
- Dobrić
- Drenovac
- Duvanište
- Žabar
- Zablaće
- Zminjak
- Jevremovac
- Jelenča
- Korman
- Krivaja
- Lipolist
- Majur
- Mala Vranjska
- Maovi
- Mačvanski Pričinović
- Metlić
- Miloševac
- Miokus
- Mišar
- Mrđenovac
- Nakučani
- Orašac
- Orid
- Petkovica
- Petlovača
- Pocerski Metković
- Pocerski Pričinović
- Predvorica
- Prnjavor
- Radovašnica
- Ribari
- Rumska
- Sinošević
- Skrađani
- Slatina
- Slepčević
- Tabanović
- Cerovac
- Culjković
- Ševarice
- Štitar

== Economy ==
Prior to 1990, Šabac had one of the best developed economies among cities in Yugoslavia. However, international sanctions against Yugoslavia during the Bosnian War provoked the shutdown of the Zorka plant, which was the main enterprise in Šabac. Many other major local firms like "Šapčanka", "Izgradnja", and "Nama" also shut down during this period.

The main industries of Šabac today are agriculture, transportation and food production. Since 2000, some of the more important companies are dairy plant Mlekara Šabac, Elixir Group, Zorka Pharma, and Hesteel Serbia Iron & Steel - Tin mill. Production of raspberry is also highly developed in Šabac area. As of September 2017, Šabac has one of 14 free economic zones established in Serbia.

The following table gives a preview of total number of registered people employed in legal entities per their core activity (as of 2022):

Activity	Total
Agriculture, forestry and fishing	217
Mining and quarrying	27
Manufacturing	10,969
Electricity, gas, steam and air conditioning supply	230
Water supply; sewerage, waste management and remediation activities	472
Construction	2,122
Wholesale and retail trade, repair of motor vehicles and motorcycles	6,105
Transportation and storage	2,413
Accommodation and food services	855
Information and communication	369
Financial and insurance activities	502
Real estate activities	87
Professional, scientific and technical activities	1,230
Administrative and support service activities	591
Public administration and defense; compulsory social security	1,499
Education	2,198
Human health and social work activities	2,232
Arts, entertainment and recreation	450
Other service activities	677
Individual agricultural workers	2,300
Total	35,545

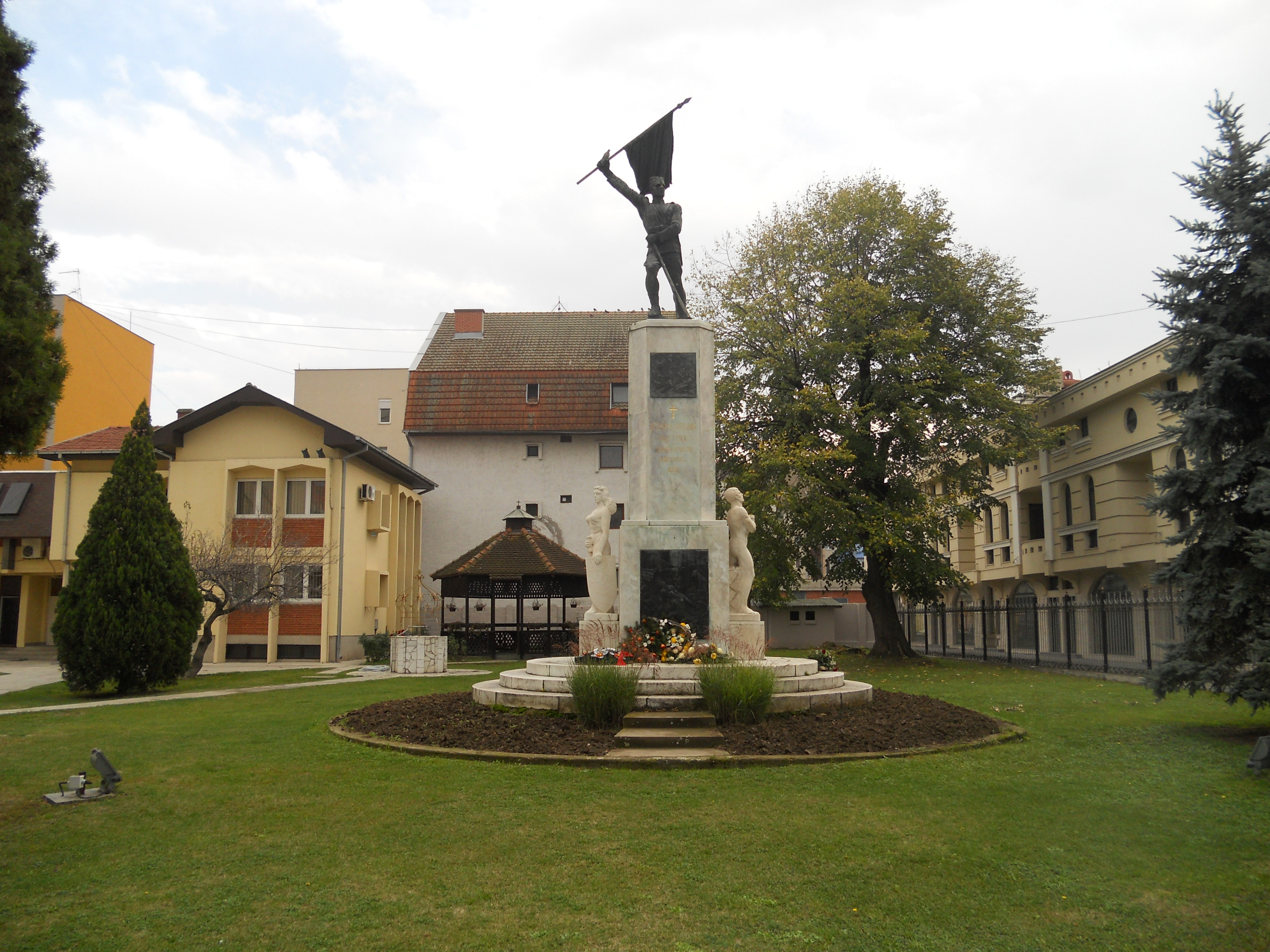
Monument dedicated to the victims of the Balkan Wars and World War I

== Sports ==
There are several sports societies in Šabac:

- FK Mačva Šabac
- RK Metaloplastika
- VK Šabac
- Basketball club Šabac
- Football club Borac
- Boxing club Šabac
- Female handball club Medicinar
- Kayak club "Zorka color" Šabac
- Wrestling club Knight Šabac

== Local media ==
=== Radio stations ===
- Radio Kruna (98.0 MHz)
- Radio AS
- Radio Roda
- Skala Radio (106.8)
- Radio Čivija
- Radio Vikom

=== TV stations ===
- RTV Šabac
- TV AS
- TV Vikom
- TV Čivija

=== Newspapers ===
- Glas Podrinja
- Podrinske novine
- Sport u Podrinju

== Education ==
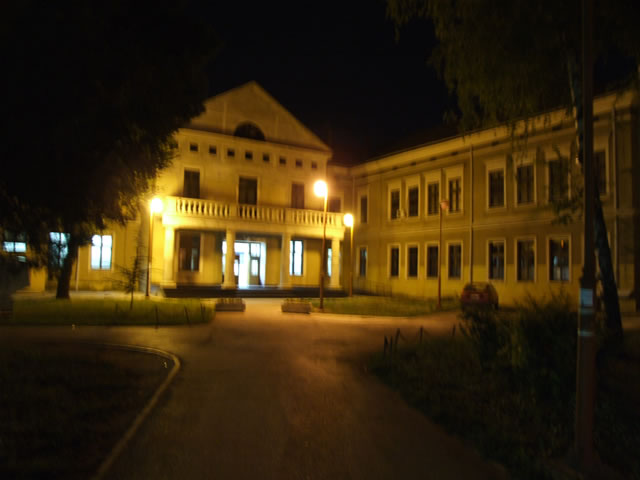
Šabac Grammar School

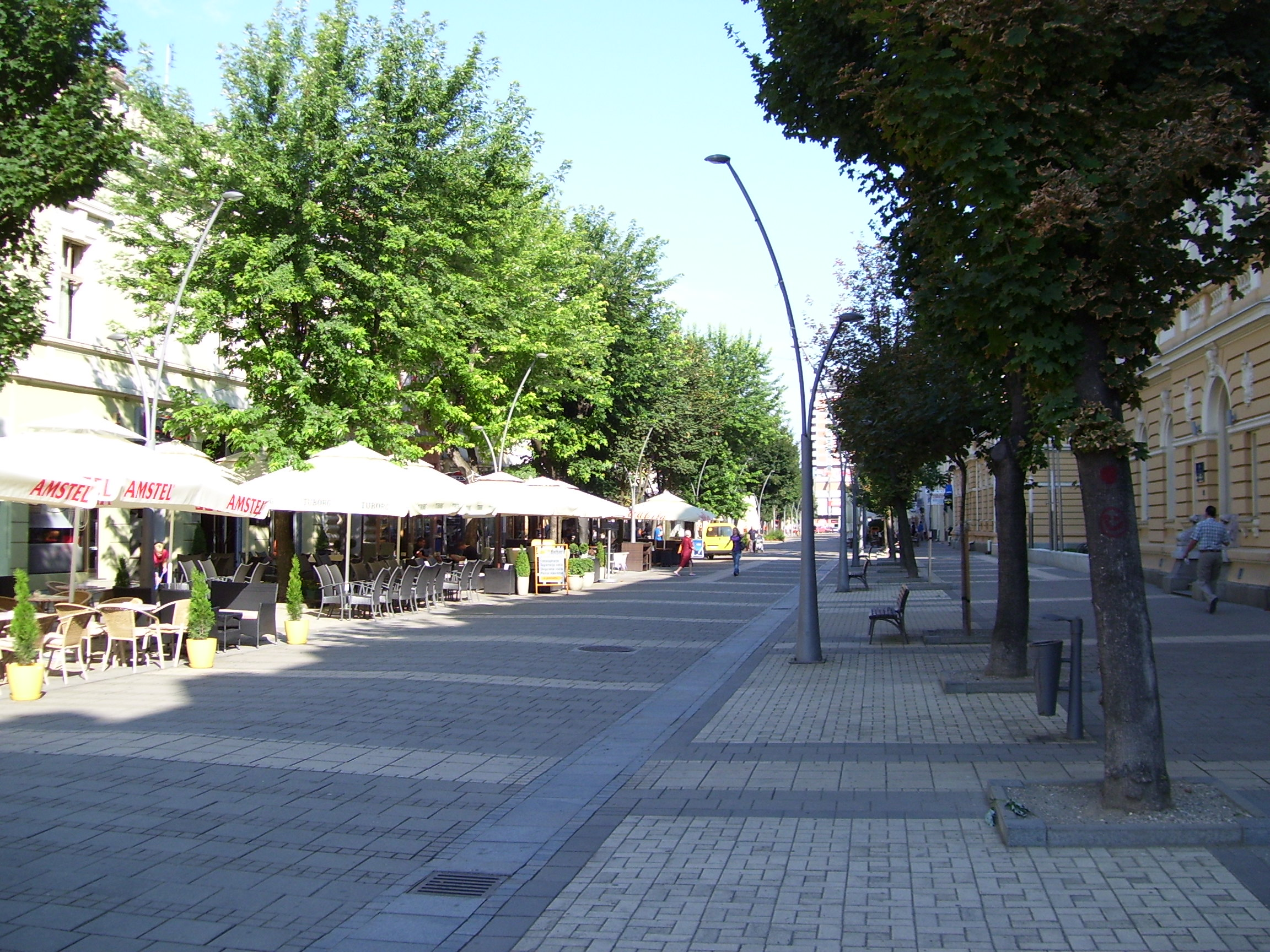
Gospodar Jevremova Street in Šabac

=== Elementary schools ===
- OŠ "Sele Jovanović"
- OŠ "Nikolaj Velimirović"
- OŠ "Vuk Karadzić"
- OŠ "Stojan Novaković"
- OŠ "Nata Jeličić"
- OŠ "Janko Veselinović"
- OŠ "Laza Lazarević"

=== High schools ===
- Šabačka gimnazija (Šabac Grammar School)
- High agriculture school
- High medicine school "Dr Andra Jovanović"
- High economical-commercial school
- High chemical and textile school
- High technical school
- High music school Mihailo Vukdragović
- High art school

=== Private centres of education ===
- King's College
- Premier
- Pygmalion
- Interlink

== Transportation ==
=== Roads ===
The length and status of roads in the city are:

- Main roads 59.9 km (37.2 mi) (all asphalt)
- Regional roads 111.4 km (69.2 mi) (all asphalt)
- Local roads 304.2 km (189.0 mi) (187.8 km (116.7 mi) asphalt)
- Unconventional roads 2,700 km (1,678 mi) (only 20 km (12 mi) asphalt)
- City streets 10 km (6 mi)

The Ruma-Šabac motorway, with a new 1,300-metre bridge on the Sava River, connects Srem and Mačva and was completed on time. The freeway from Ruma to Šabac is 24.6 kilometres long, including the Sava bridge and its related parts. This includes 440 meters connected to the Fruška Gora Corridor, 22.08 kilometers of road, the 1.335-kilometer-long Sava Bridge, and 700 meters of section 3 leading to the Drenovac Interchange.

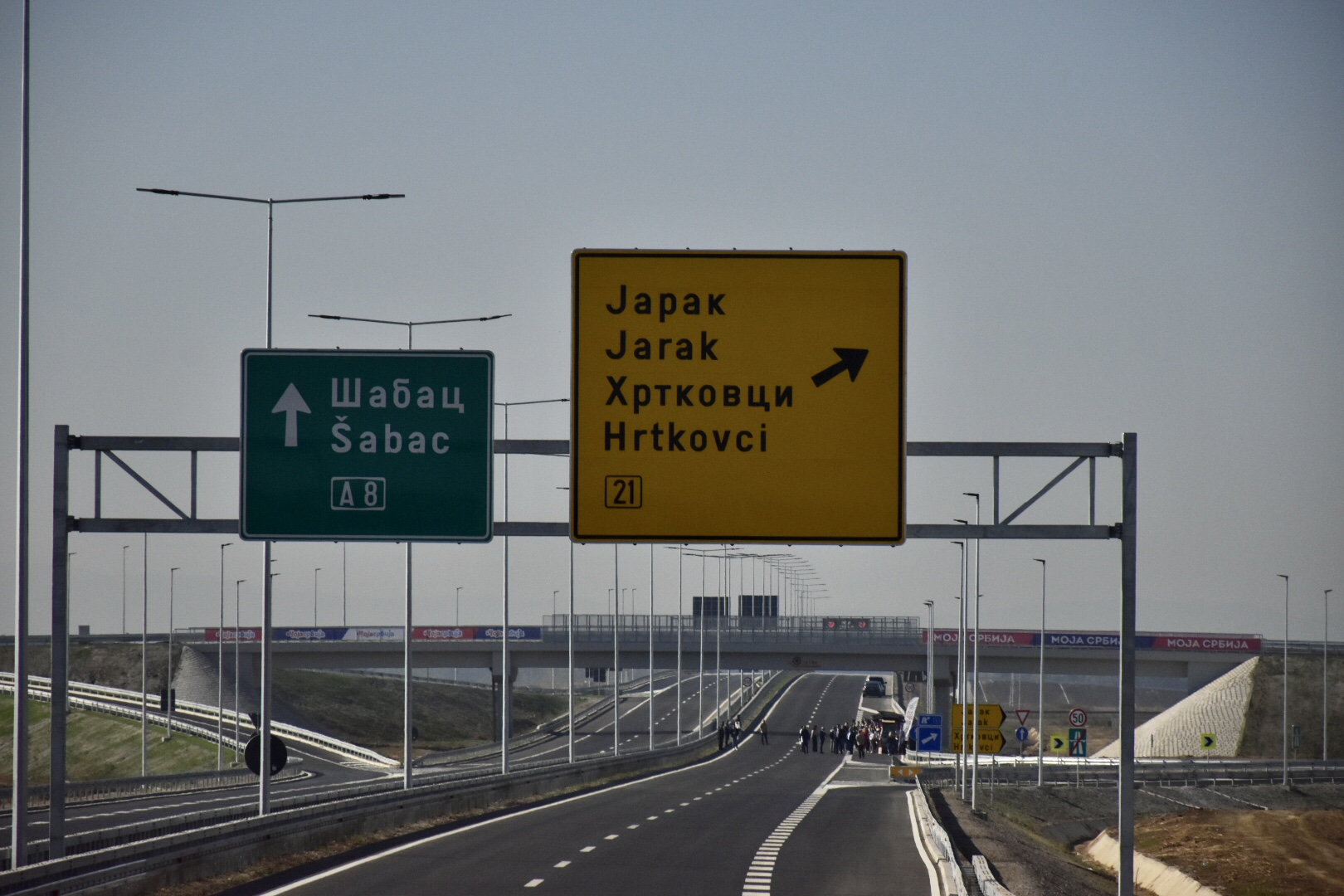
Ruma-Šabac motorway

=== Railway ===
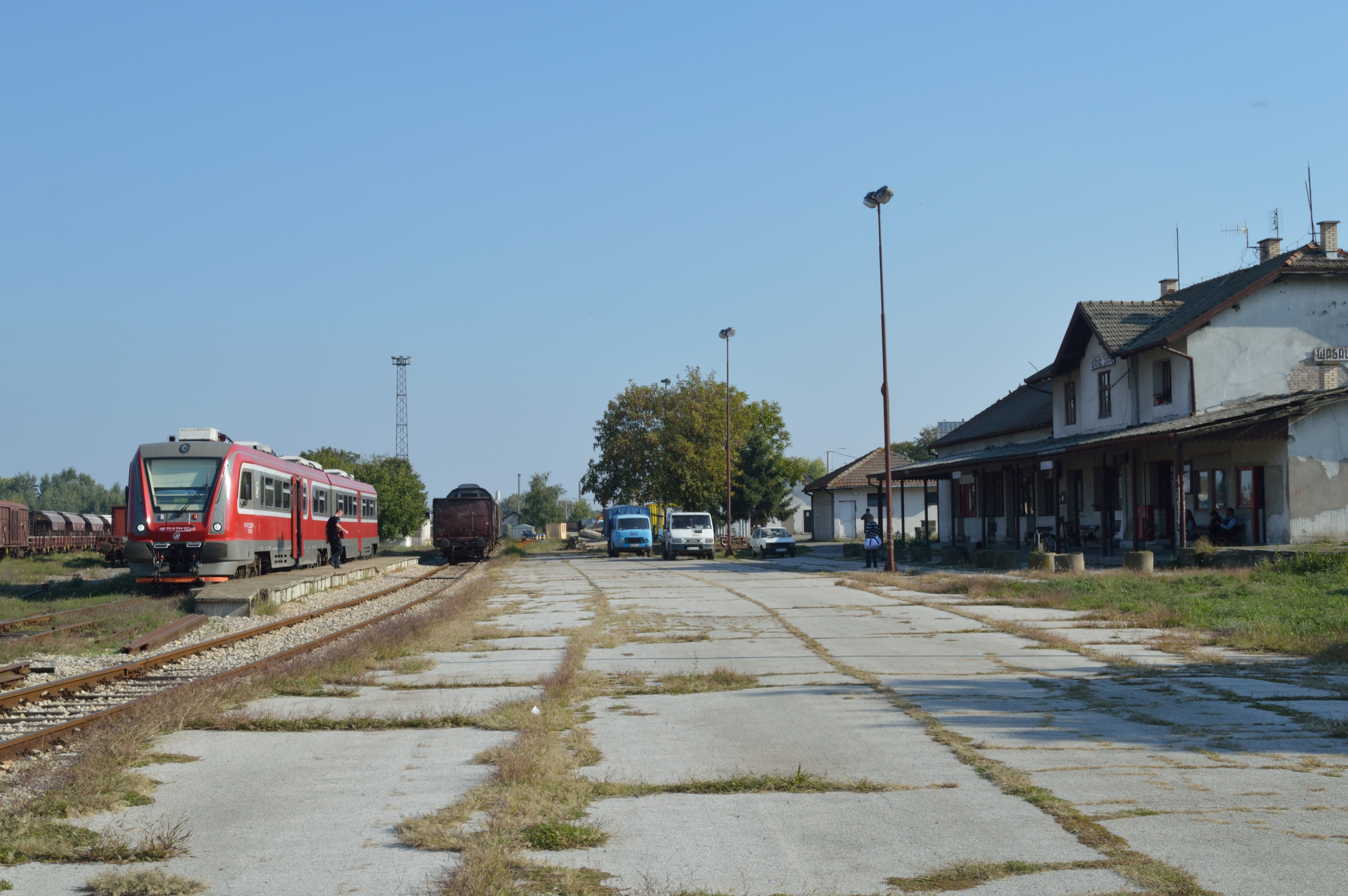
Serbian Railways class 711 diesel multiple unit on Šabac-Ruma local passenger train at Šabac.

Šabac railway station is served by a Serbian Railways' branch line connecting to the main Croatia to Belgrade railway at Ruma. A former line continued from the station to connect Serbia with Bosnia and Herzegovina. A branch which connected this line with Bogatić (Petlovača - Bogatić) is locked out. The railway is used for the transport of goods and raw materials for the Zorka factory and passenger transport to Ruma.

== Politics ==
Incumbent Šabac mayor Aleksandar Pajić resigned on 30 October 2023 in order to prompt a new election and was appointed as leader of a provisional authority.

The results of the election were as follows:

Party	Votes	%	Seats
Aleksandar Vučić–Šabac Must Not Stop (Serbian Progressive Party, PUPS – Solidarity and Justice, Movement of Socialists)	28,808	45.45	35
Šabac Against Violence–Nebojša Zelenović (Together, Party of Freedom and Justice, Democratic Party, Civic Democratic Party, Serbian Renewal Movement, Movement for the Restoration of the Kingdom of Serbia, Movement for Reversal)	15,600	24.61	18
Citizens' Group: Nemanja Pajić–Western Serbia–Always Šabac	6,807	10.74	8
United We Win–Miroslav Aleksić–Zdravko Ponoš–Miloš Parandilović–Tatjana Marković Topalović (Serbia Centre, People's Movement of Serbia, New Face of Serbia)	2,307	3.64	2
Ivica Dačić–Prime Minister of Serbia (Socialist Party of Serbia)	2,210	3.49	2
Dr. Miloš Jovanović–Hope for Šabac–Serbian Coalition NADA–National Democratic Alternative–New Democratic Party of Serbia (New DSS)–For the Kingdom of Serbia	1,969	3.11	2
Citizens' Group: A Clean Slate for a Different Šabac–Vladimir Terzić–Dušan Tufegdžić	1,698	2.68	–
Dr. Dejan Pavlović–European Green Party	1,321	2.08	2
Citizens' Group: At Home for the Village and the City–We Know It–Dragan Stanković	898	1.42	–
Dr. Vojislav Šešelj–Serbian Radical Party	872	1.38	–
It Is Time for Action–Dr. Saša Filipović (Green Party of Serbia)	492	0.78	–
Russian Party–Slobodan Nikolić	408	0.64	–
Total	63,390	100.00	69
Valid votes	63,390	97.29	
Invalid/blank votes	1,768	2.71	
Total votes	65,158	100.00	
Registered voters/turnout	100,051	65.12	

Aleksandar Pajić was chosen for another term as mayor after the election. The local government is supported by the Serbian Progressive Party's alliance, Western Serbia, the European Green Party, and the Socialist Party of Serbia.

Tatjana Marković Topalović was elected to the city assembly from the lead position on the United We Win list.

== Non-government organizations in Šabac ==
According to unofficial data, in the city of Šabac, there are over 300 registered non-government organizations, with wide variety of activities and different primary goals. Traditionally, the most active are those organizations whose primary goals are humanitarian, protection of the rights of persons with disabilities, protection of the rights of ethnic minorities, protection of the vulnerable social categories, ecology, etc.

Beside traditionally active organizations in Šabac, there are non-government organizations which unites young people in purpose of protecting their own rights. Under the social category of youth (young people) are those who are not older than 30, and not younger than 15 years, according to Ministry (Department) of youth and sports, of the Republic of Serbia.

Some of the most active organizations in Šabac are: Youth Umbrella (Omladinski Kišobran), Caritas - Šabac, Roma for Roma, Human heart of Šabac (Humano srce Šapca), NGO Light, NGO Ecos.

== Notable people ==
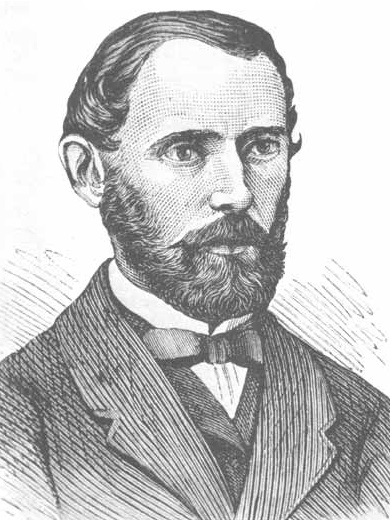
Vladimir Jovanović

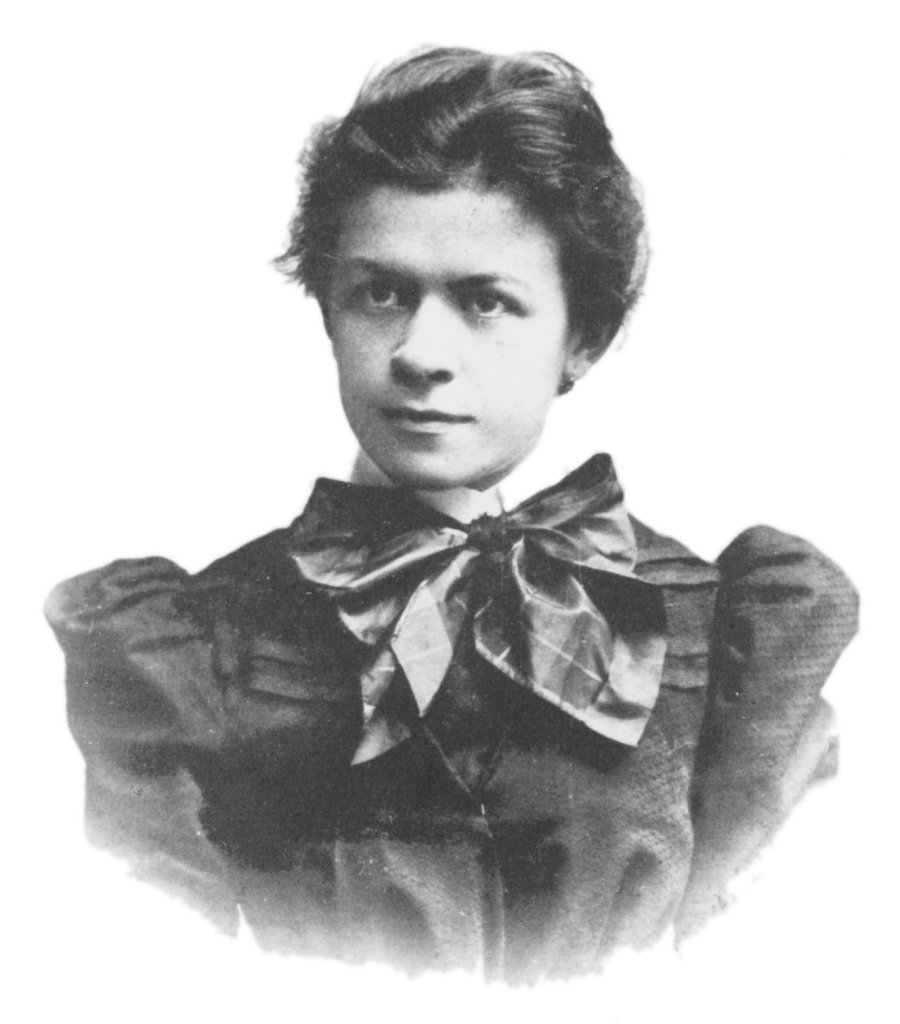
Mileva Marić-Einstein

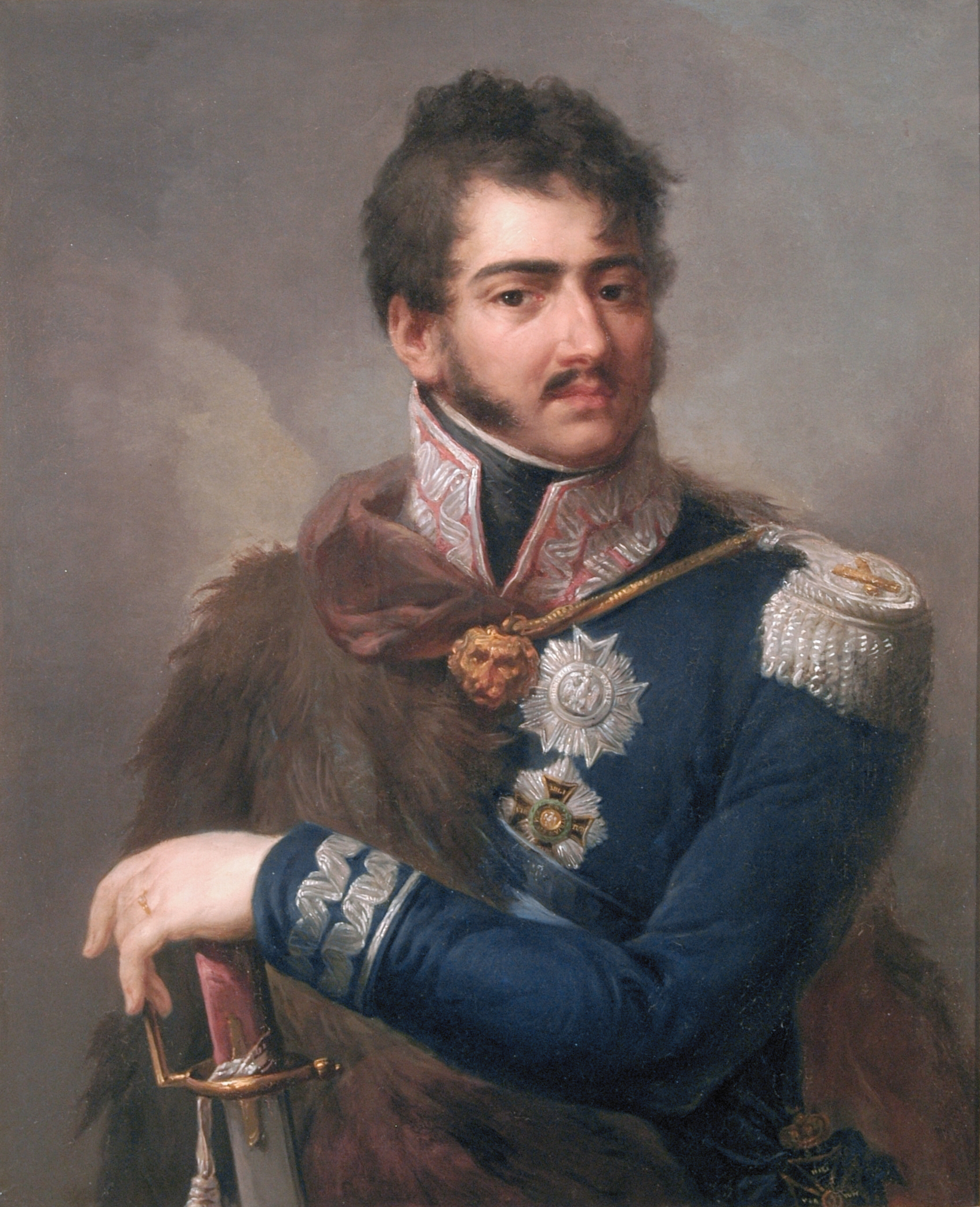
Józef Poniatowski

=== Artists ===
- Branimir Ćosić, writer and journalist
- Branislav Lečić, actor
- Dušan Ninić, novelist
- Isidora Sekulić, writer
- Janko Veselinović, writer
- Jela Spiridonović-Savić, poet
- Kosta Abrašević, poet
- Ljubiša Jovanović, actor
- Milić Stanković, painter
- Milorad Popović Šapčanin, poet, writer, dramatist, pedagogue and educational reformer
- Sasha Knezev, Serbian American filmmaker and author
- Stanislav Vinaver, avant-garde writer
- Šaban Šaulić, folk singer
- Vladislav Lalicki, production designer, costume designer, painter
- Živojin Pavlović, film director, writer
- Alex Lifeson, guitarist of Canadian rock band Rush born to ethnic Serbian parents from Šabac
- Nela Vidaković, pop-folk singer

=== Politicians ===
- Jevrem Obrenović, younger brother of Prince Miloš Obrenović, governor of the Šabac nahija (district)
- Dragiša Lapčević, politician, journalist, historian
- Józef Poniatowski, Polish leader, general
- Slobodan Jovanović, historian, lawyer, literary critic and politician
- Lyenko Urbanchich (1922–2006), Australian politician

=== Academics ===
- Draga Ljočić, the first female doctor in Serbia
- Mileva Marić, Serbian physicist and wife of Albert Einstein
- Laza Lazarević, doctor, writer
- Stojan Novaković, historian, scholar, writer, literary critic, translator, politician and diplomat
- Jasmina Vujic, nuclear engineering professor at Berkeley, 1st female nuclear engineering department chair in the US
- Vladimir Jovanović, philosopher, political theorist, economist, politician, political writer
- Jovan Cvijić, geographer, president of the Serbian Royal Academy, rector of the Belgrade University
- Sava Petrović, botanist

=== Sports people ===
- Mile Isaković, handballer
- Milutin Dragićević, handballer
- Miroslav Đukić, footballer
- Nemanja Matić, footballer
- Aleksa Purić, footballer
- Veselin Vujović, handball player

== Coat of arms of Šabac and armorial flag ==
There are three versions of the coat of arms of Šabac: the Primary, Middle, and Large.

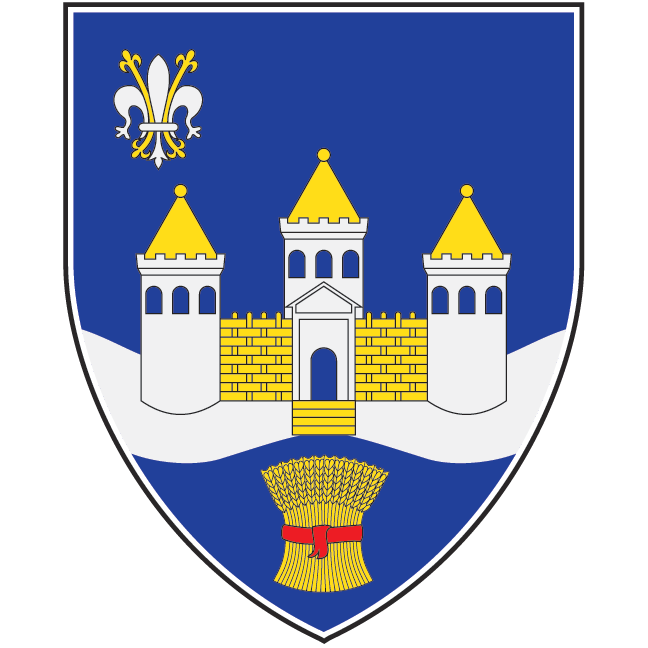
Primary coat of arms

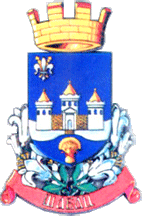
Middle coat of arms

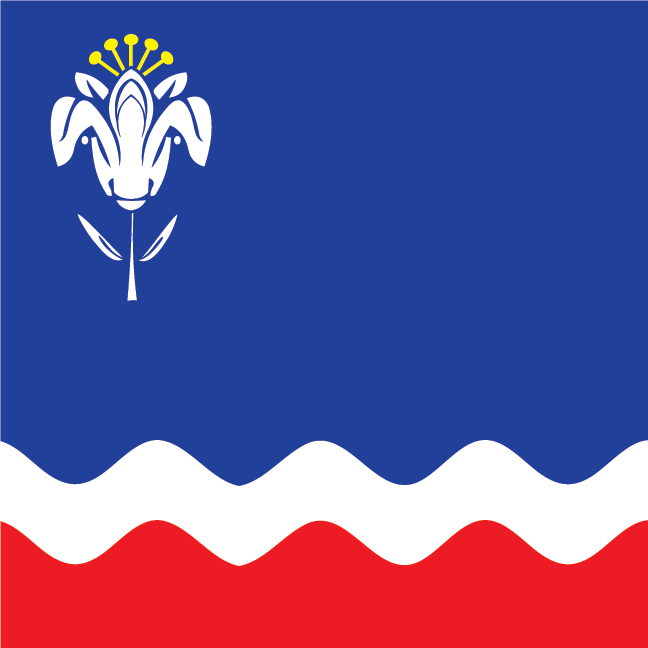
Šabac Armorial flag

== Twin towns – sister cities ==
Šabac is twinned with:

- Argostoli, Greece
- Fujimi, Japan
- Kiryat Ata, Israel
- Kralupy nad Vltavou, Czech Republic
