= Orid =

Orid Орид (Serbian)
- Village (Selo)
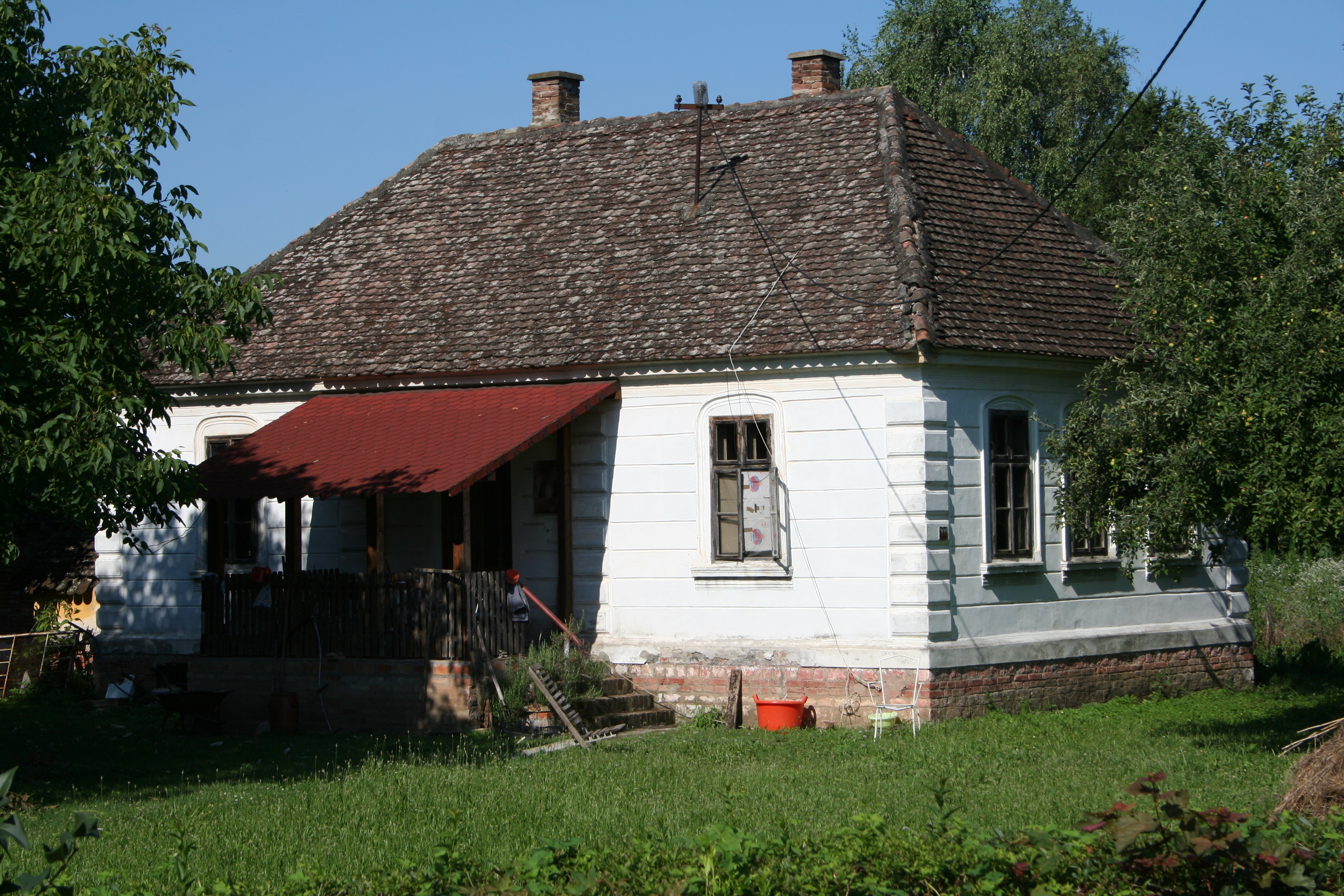

- Location within Serbia
- Coordinates: 44°42′29″N 19°48′05″E
- Country: Serbia
- District: Mačva District
- Municipality: Šabac

Population (2002)
  - Total: 192
- Time zone: UTC+1 (CET)
  - Summer (DST): UTC+2 (CEST)

Orid is a village in the municipality of Šabac, Serbia. According to the 2002 census, the village has a population of 192 people.
