= Rumska =

Rumska Румска (Serbian)
- Village (Selo)
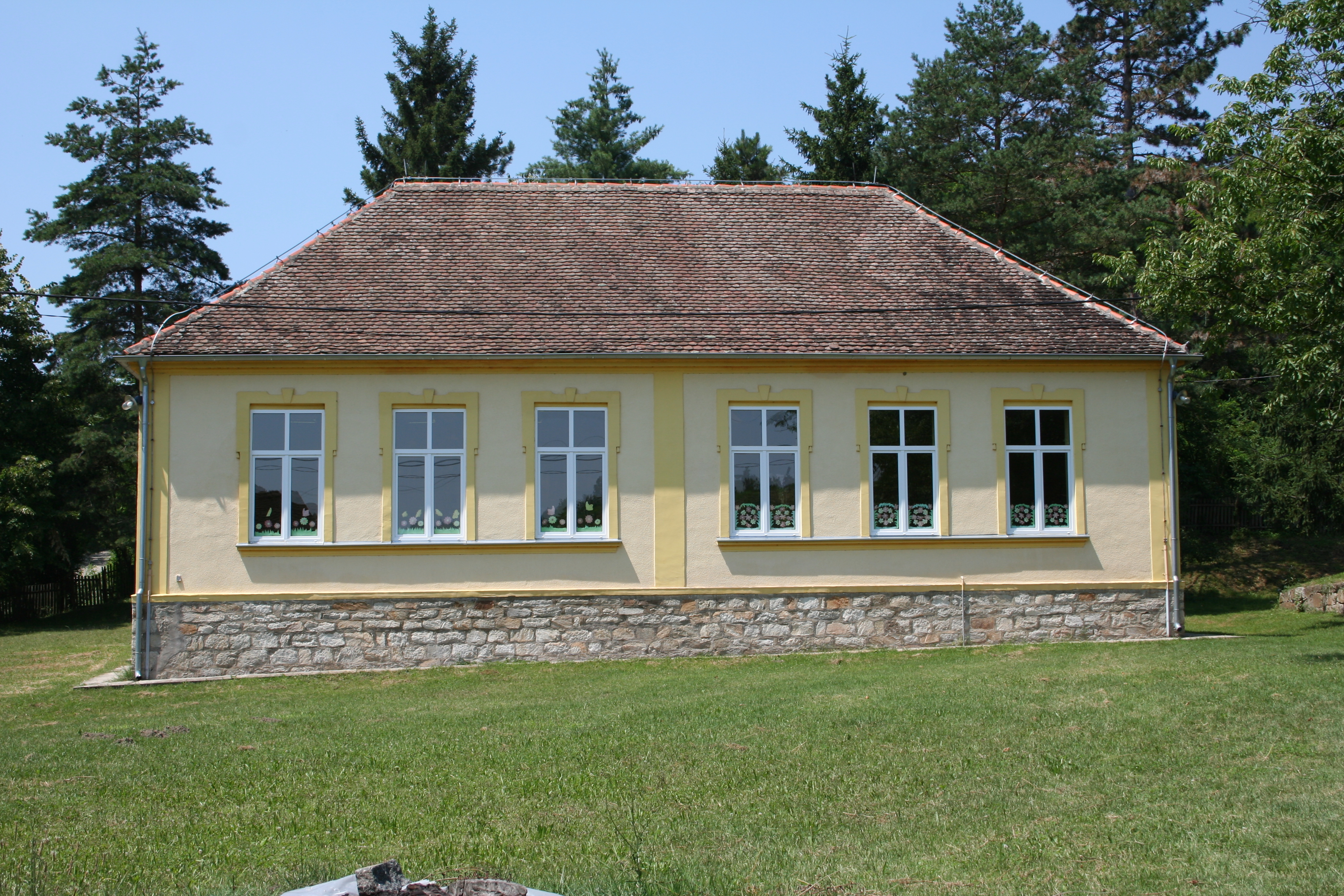

- Location within Serbia
- Coordinates: 44°34′06″N 19°34′39″E
- Country: Serbia
- District: Mačva District
- Municipality: Šabac

Population (2002)
  - Total: 911
- Time zone: UTC+1 (CET)
  - Summer (DST): UTC+2 (CEST)

Rumska (Serbian Cyrillic: Румска) is a village in the municipality of Šabac, Serbia. According to the 2002 census, the village has a population of 911 people.
