= Petkovica (Šabac) =

Petkovica Петковица (Serbian)
- Village (Selo)
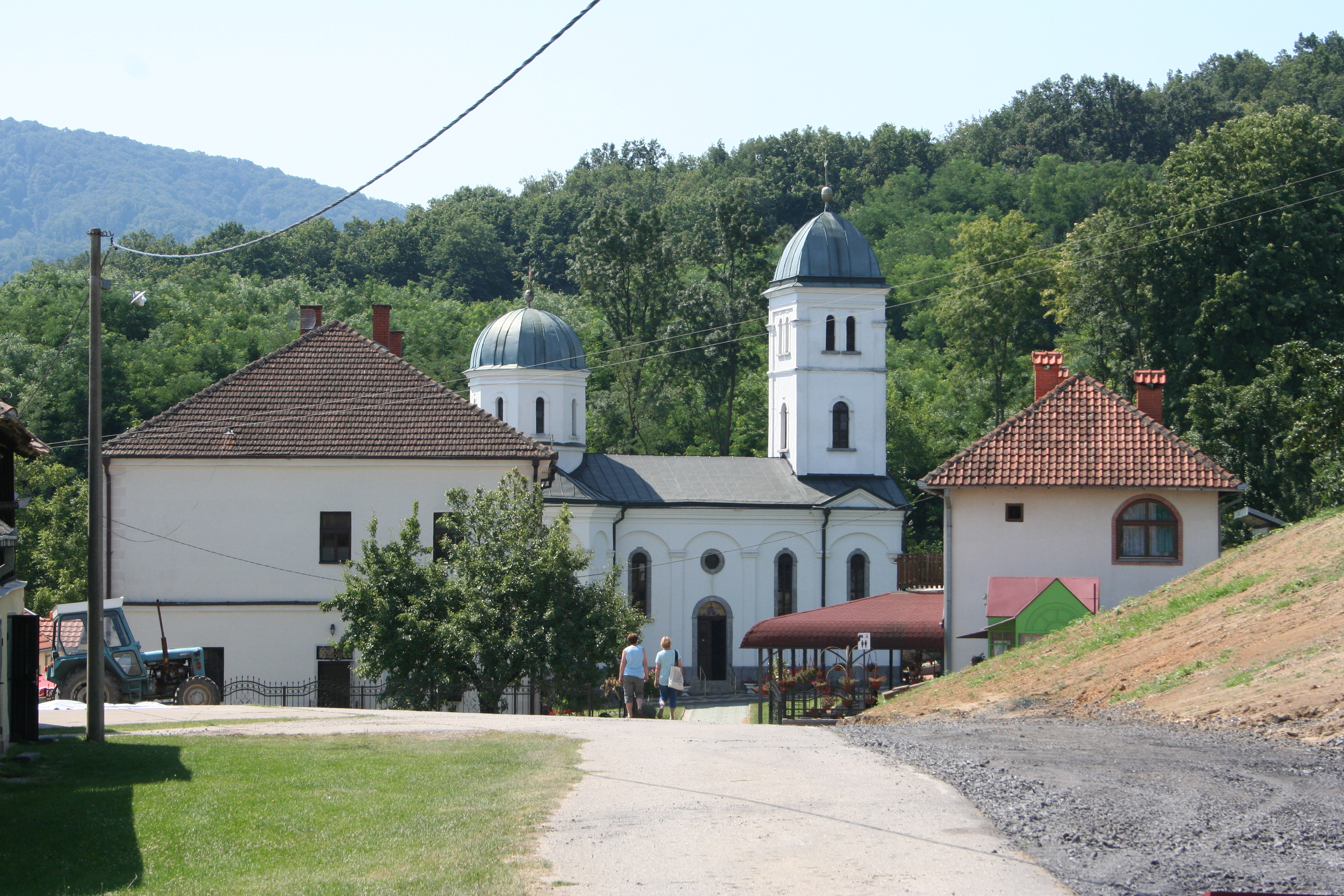

- Location within Serbia
- Coordinates: 44°39′56.16″N 19°26′21.12″E
- Country: Serbia
- District: Mačva District
- Municipality: Šabac

Population (2002)
  - Total: 967
- Time zone: UTC+1 (CET)
  - Summer (DST): UTC+2 (CEST)

Petkovica is a village in the municipality of Šabac, Serbia. According to the 2002 census, the village has a population of 967 people.
