= Nela Vidaković =

Serbian pop-folk singer (born 1981)

Nela Vidaković Нелa Видaковић
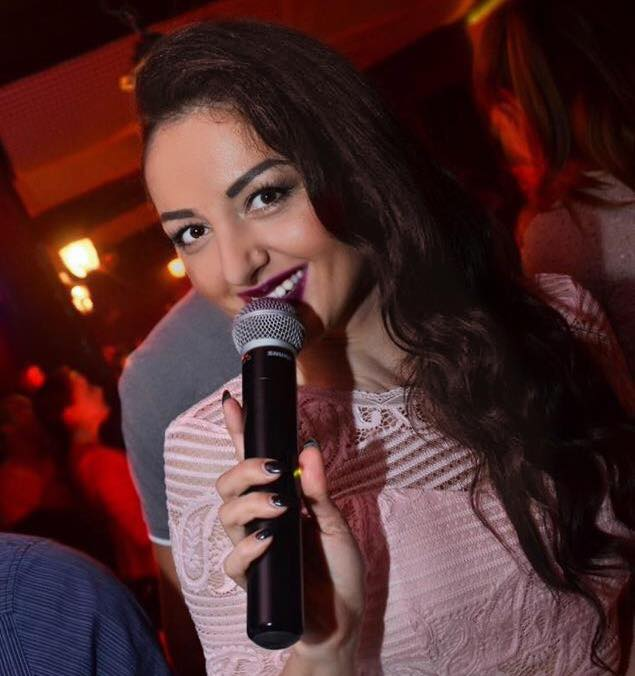

Background information
- Also known as: Nella
- Born: Nela Vidaković; 18 December 1981 (age 44); Šabac, SR Serbia, SFR Yugoslavia
- Genres: Pop folk
- Occupation: Singer
- Years active: 2007–present
- Label: Grand Production

Nela "Nella" Vidaković (Serbian Cyrillic: Нелa Видaковић, born 18 December 1981) is a Serbian pop-folk singer.

== Personal life ==
Nela Vidakovic was born in Šabac, Serbia. At eight she began to attend music school to learn flute, and later enrolled at the Faculty of Music Arts in Belgrade. She graduated in 2006 and became B.Sc. Musician (professor of music and flute).

After graduation, she was employed at the State Music School in Loznica (Serbia) as a professor of the flute, and remains little more than a year. In 2007 she published her first studio solo album. 2011 two of her singer-songwriter songs were used in the movie "White lions" whose director, screenwriter and actor was Lazar Ristovski. In 2015 she participated in the VIP Reality PAROVI on national television "Happy".

== Discography ==
Studio albums

- Crveni bmw (2007)
- Policija (2009)
- Beograd Luduje (2013)

Singles

- Navika (2008)
- Bubašvaba (2011)
- Martini (2015)
- General (2016)
- Emirati (2017)
- Meni se ne udaje (2020)
- ‘’ ORAS ‘’ (2024)
- ‘’ Komšinica i Sneško ‘’ (2025)
- ‘’ IMAM JEDNU ĆERKU ‘’ (2025)
- ‘’ ČUVAJ MI SE KRVI MOJA ‘’ (2025)
- ‘’ DOĐI KUĆI BRATE ‘’ (2025)
