= Budišić =

Budišić may refer to:

- Budišić, Mali Zvornik, a village in Serbia
- Nikola Budišić (born 1947), Serbian football player
