= Čitluk, Mali Zvornik =

Coordinates: 44.3117°N 19.1606°E

Čitluk Читлук
- Village (Selo)
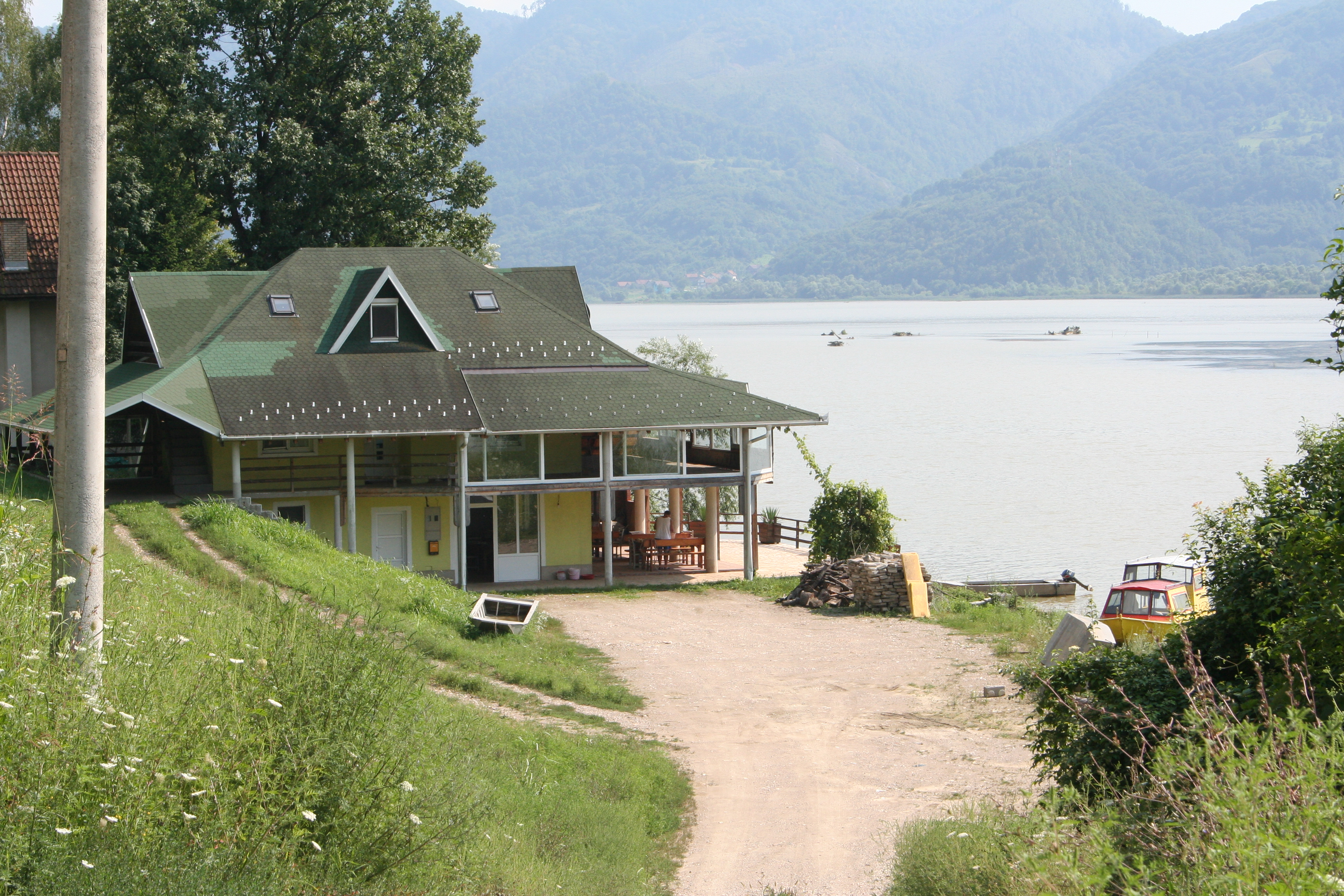
- Interactive map of Čitluk
- Country: Serbia
- Municipality: Mali Zvornik
- Time zone: UTC+1 (CET)
  - Summer (DST): UTC+2 (CEST)

Čitluk (Serbian Cyrillic: Читлук) is a village in Serbia. It is situated in the Mali Zvornik municipality, in the Mačva District of Central Serbia. The population of the village is 238 (2002 census), all of which are Serbs.

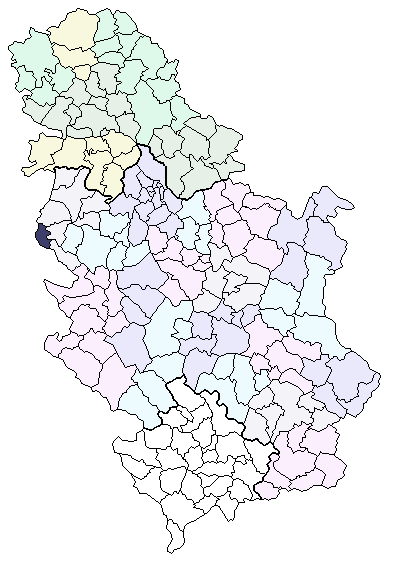
Location of the Mali Zvornik municipality in Serbia

== Historical population ==
- 1948: 371
- 1953: 412
- 1961: 370
- 1971: 333
- 1981: 285
- 1991: 277
- 2002: 238

Historical population
Year	Pop.	±%
1948	371	—
1953	412	+11.1%
1961	370	−10.2%
1971	333	−10.0%
1981	285	−14.4%
1991	277	−2.8%
2002	238	−14.1%
2011	179	−24.8%

== See also ==
- List of places in Serbia
