= Donja Trešnjica =

Coordinates: 44°20′41″N 19°10′53″E

Donja Trešnjica Доња Трешњица
- Village (Selo)
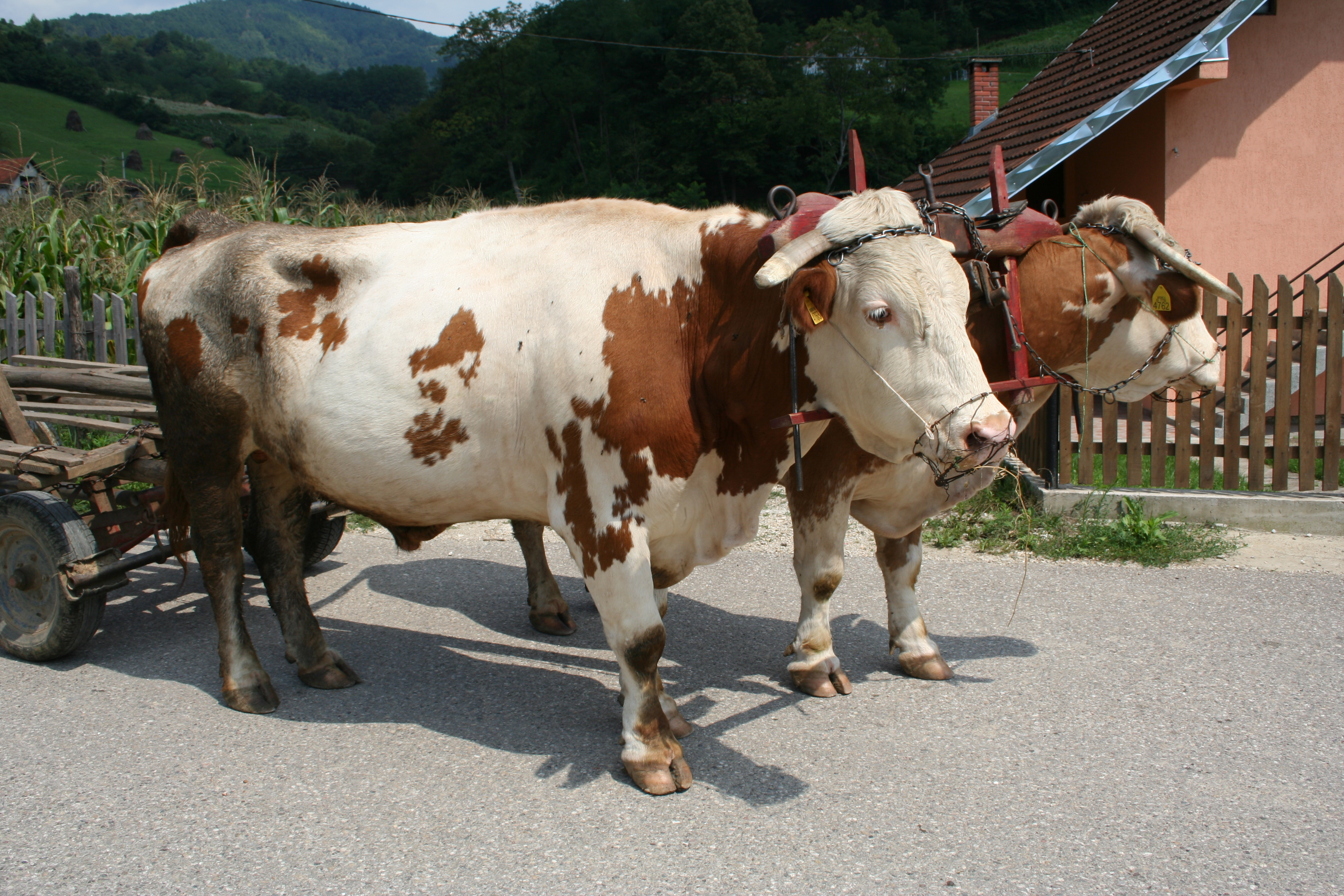
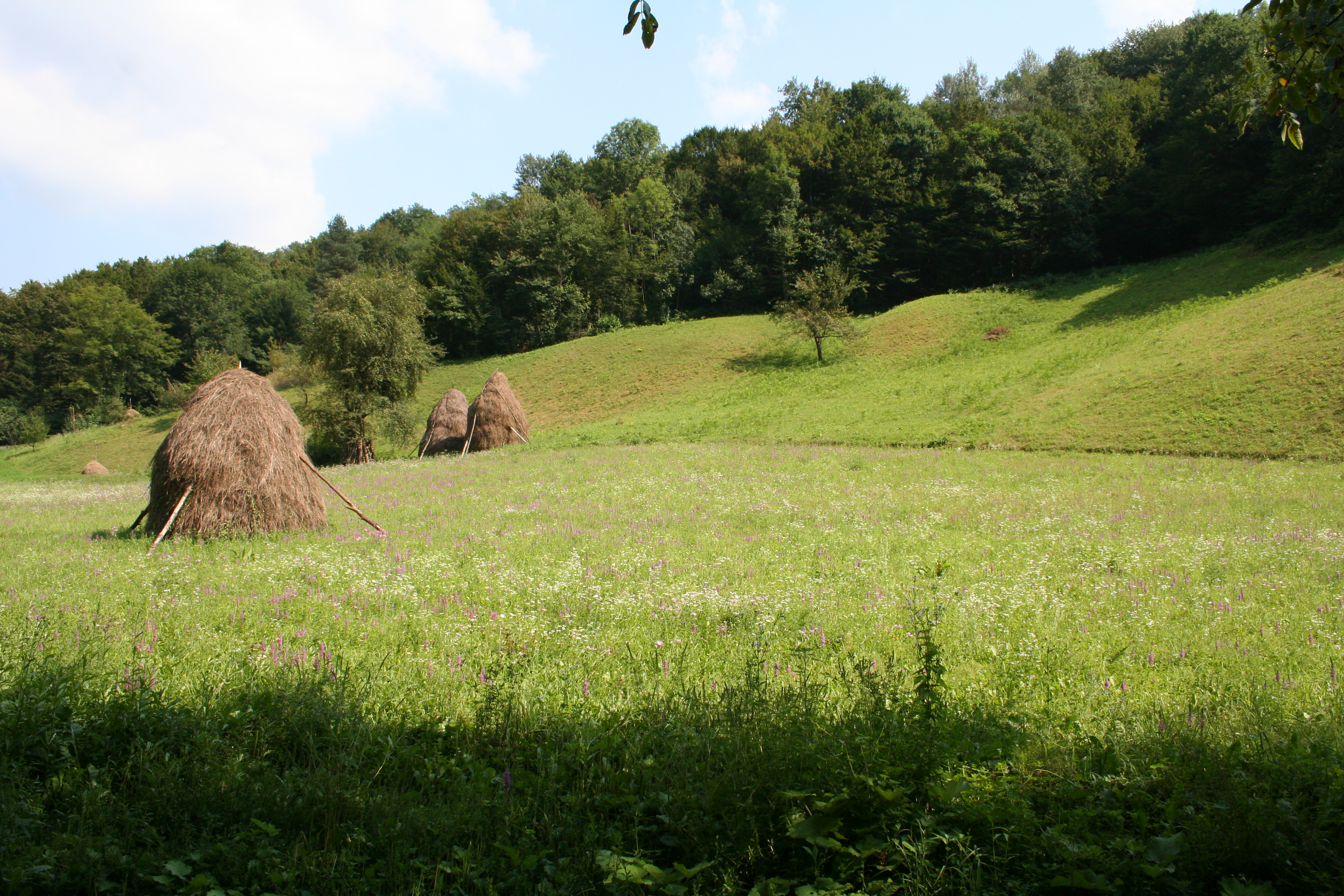
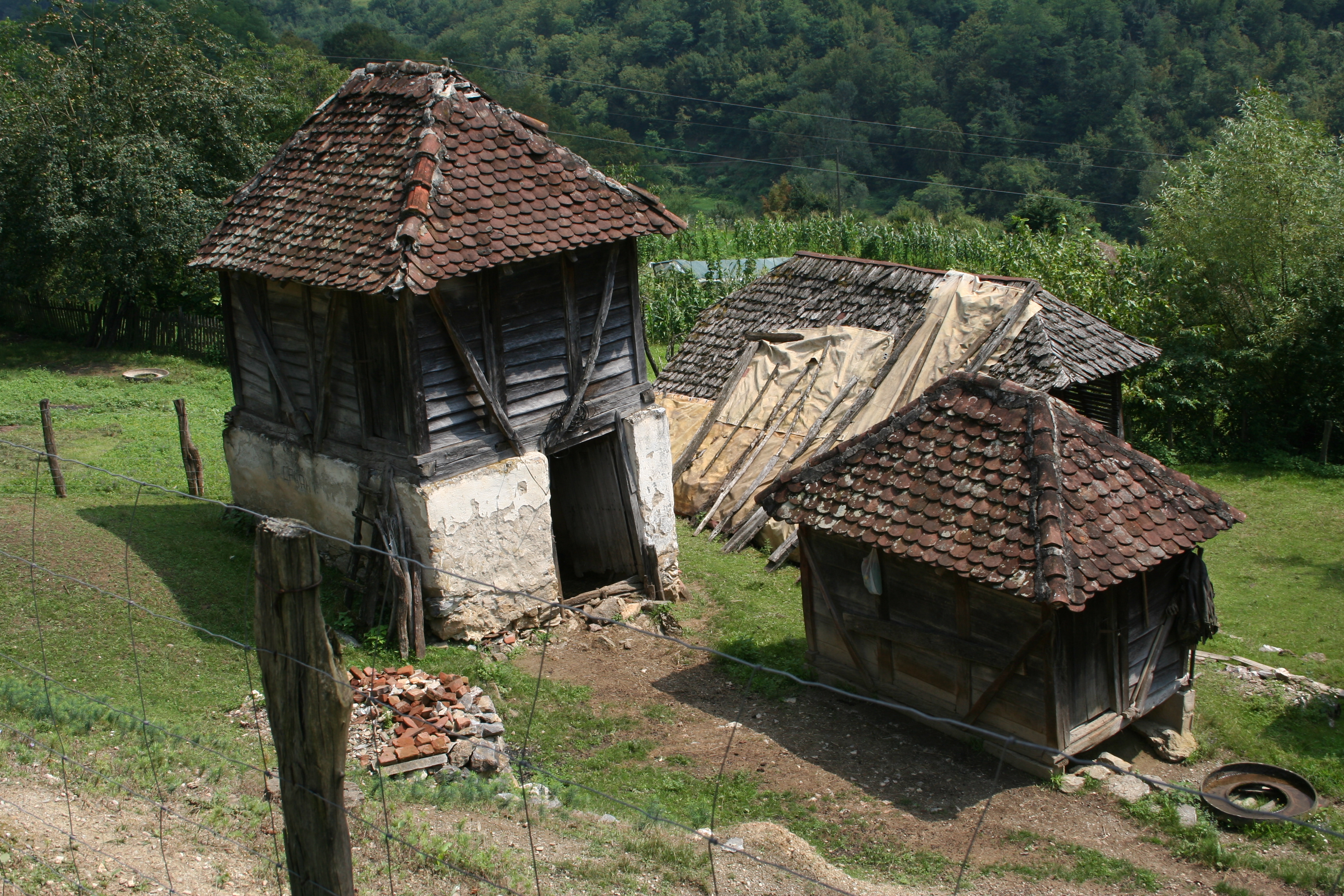
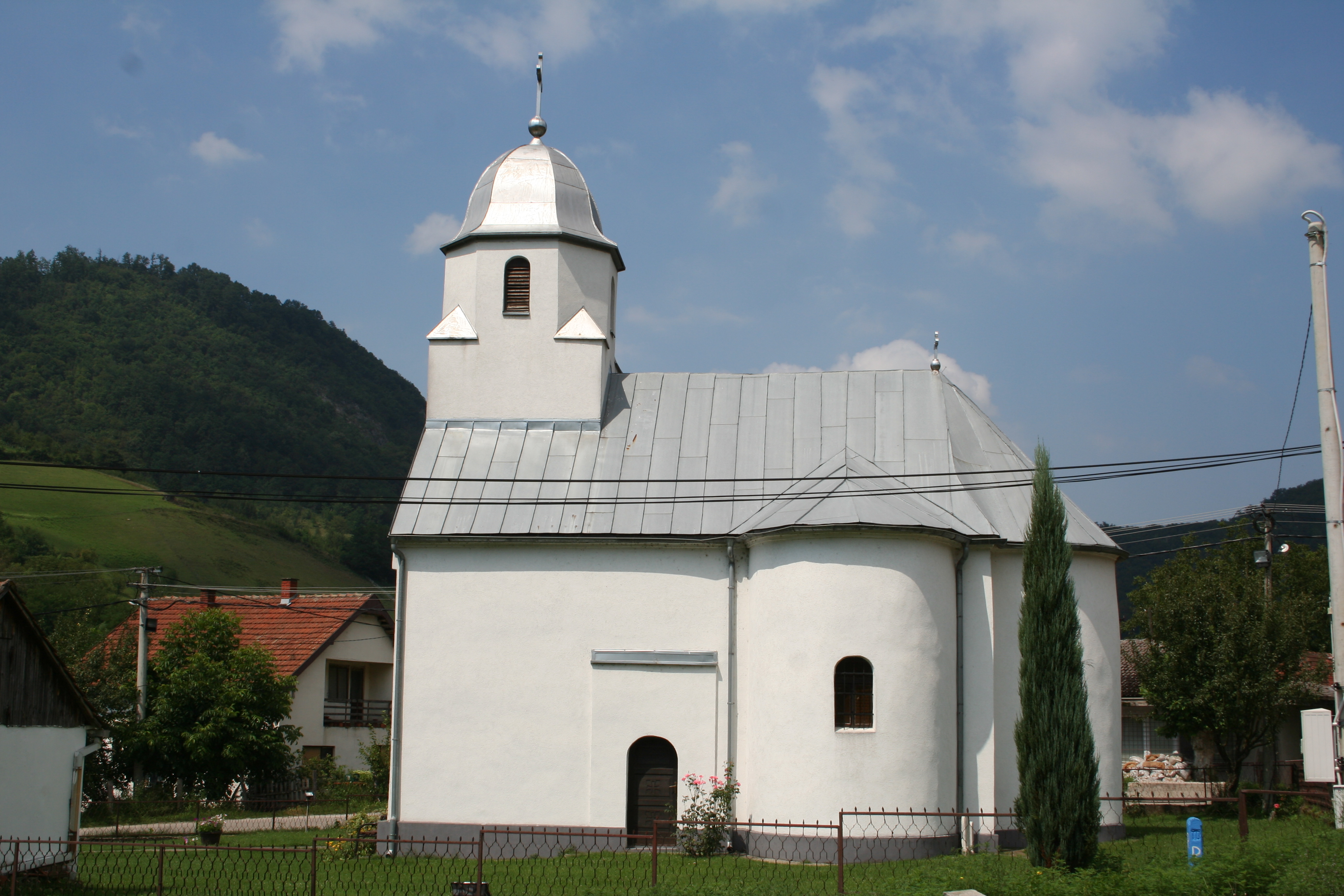
- Interactive map of Donja Trešnjica
- Country: Serbia
- Municipality: Mali Zvornik
- Time zone: UTC+1 (CET)
  - Summer (DST): UTC+2 (CEST)

Donja Trešnjica (Serbian Cyrillic: Доња Трешњица) is a village in Serbia. It is situated in the Mali Zvornik municipality, in the Mačva District of Central Serbia. The population of the village is 688 (2002 census) with 682 people comprising the Serb ethnic majority.

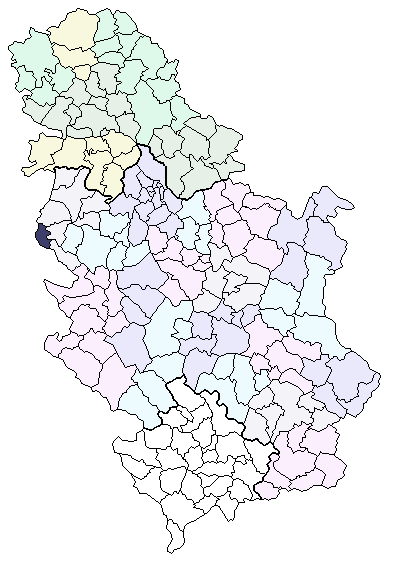
Location of the Mali Zvornik municipality in Serbia

== Historical population ==
- 1948: 886
- 1953: 968
- 1961: 1,044
- 1971: 959
- 1981: 749
- 1991: 730
- 2002: 688

Historical population
Year	Pop.	±%
1948	886	—
1953	968	+9.3%
1961	1,044	+7.9%
1971	959	−8.1%
1981	749	−21.9%
1991	730	−2.5%
2002	688	−5.8%
2011	575	−16.4%

== See also ==
- List of places in Serbia
