= Sakar, Mali Zvornik =

Sakar Сакар (Serbian)
- Village (Selo)
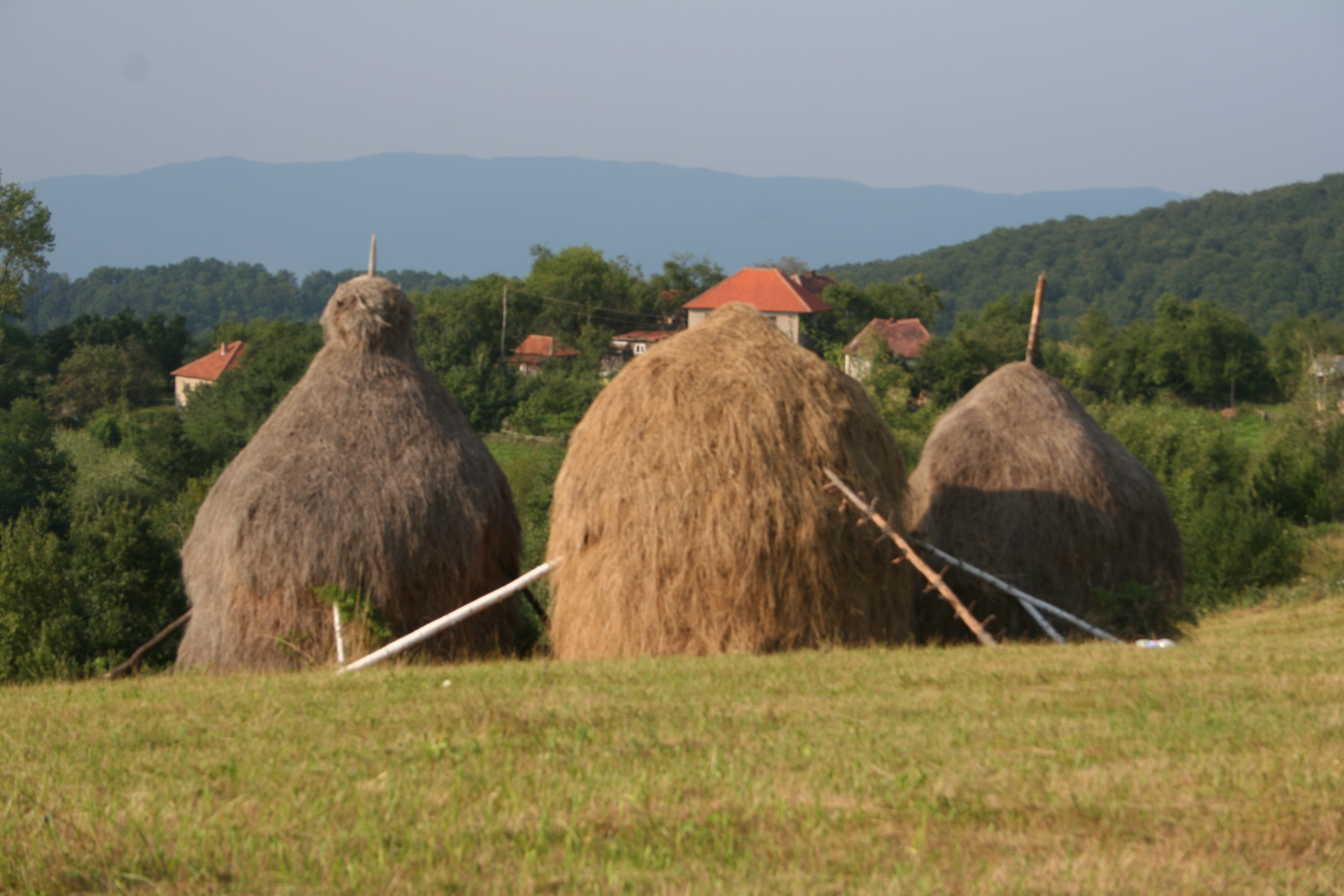

- Location within Serbia
- Coordinates: 44°22′0″N 19°8′00″E
- Country: Serbia
- Municipality: Mali Zvornik

Population (2011)
  - Total: 452
- Time zone: UTC+1 (CET)
  - Summer (DST): UTC+2 (CEST)

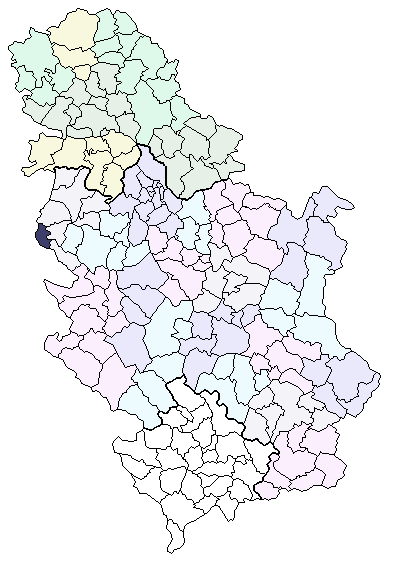
Location of the Mali Zvornik municipality in Serbia

Sakar (Сакар (Serbian)) is a small village next to Mali Zvornik in the Mačva District of Serbia. It has a population of 504 people. The village is on Lake Zvornik (Зворничко језеро (Serbian)). It is near a hydroelectric power station.

== History ==
There were only two Muslim villages on the right side of the Drina river in 1862: Mali Zvornik and Sakar. Sakar came under the administration of the Principality of Serbia when it became internationally recognized as a condition of the Treaty of Berlin. After this event, Serbian families began to move into the village. The nearby hydroelectric power station was completed in 1954, and the resulting inundation of farmland depleted the traditional Muslim population of the village.

== Historical population ==
- 1948: 451
- 1953: 423
- 1961: 499
- 1971: 508
- 1981: 587
- 1991: 633
- 2002: 504

Historical population
Year	Pop.	±%
1948	451	—
1953	423	−6.2%
1961	499	+18.0%
1971	508	+1.8%
1981	587	+15.6%
1991	633	+7.8%
2002	504	−20.4%
2011	452	−10.3%

=== Ethnic groups in Sakar (2002) ===
Nationality	Number	%
Serbs	320	63.49
ethnic Muslims	120	23.80
Bosniaks	56	11.11
Yugoslavs	4	0.79
Unknown/Others	4	0.79

== See also ==
- List of places in Serbia
