= Culine =

Coordinates: 44°17′58″N 19°11′22″E

Culine Цулине
- Village (Selo)
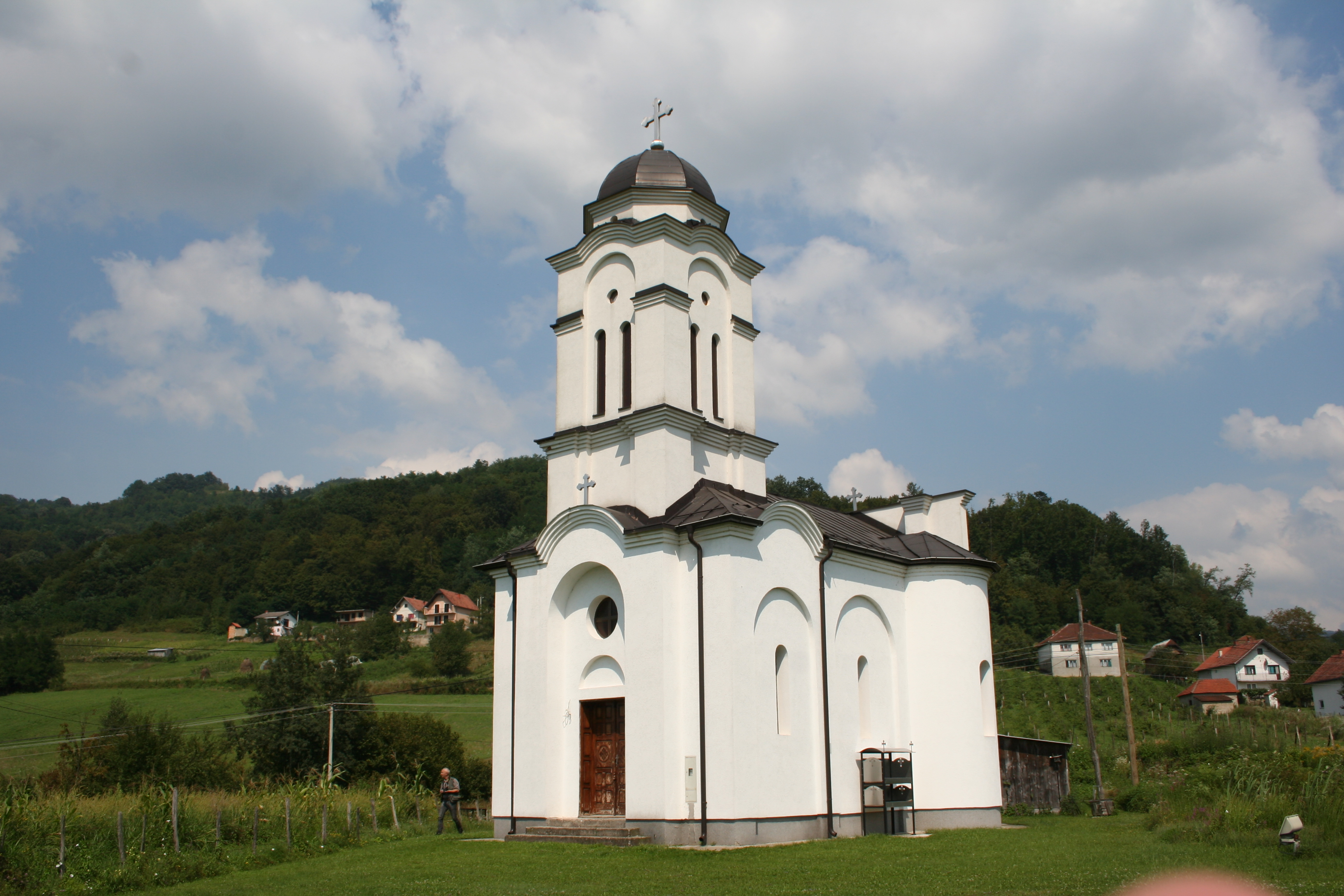
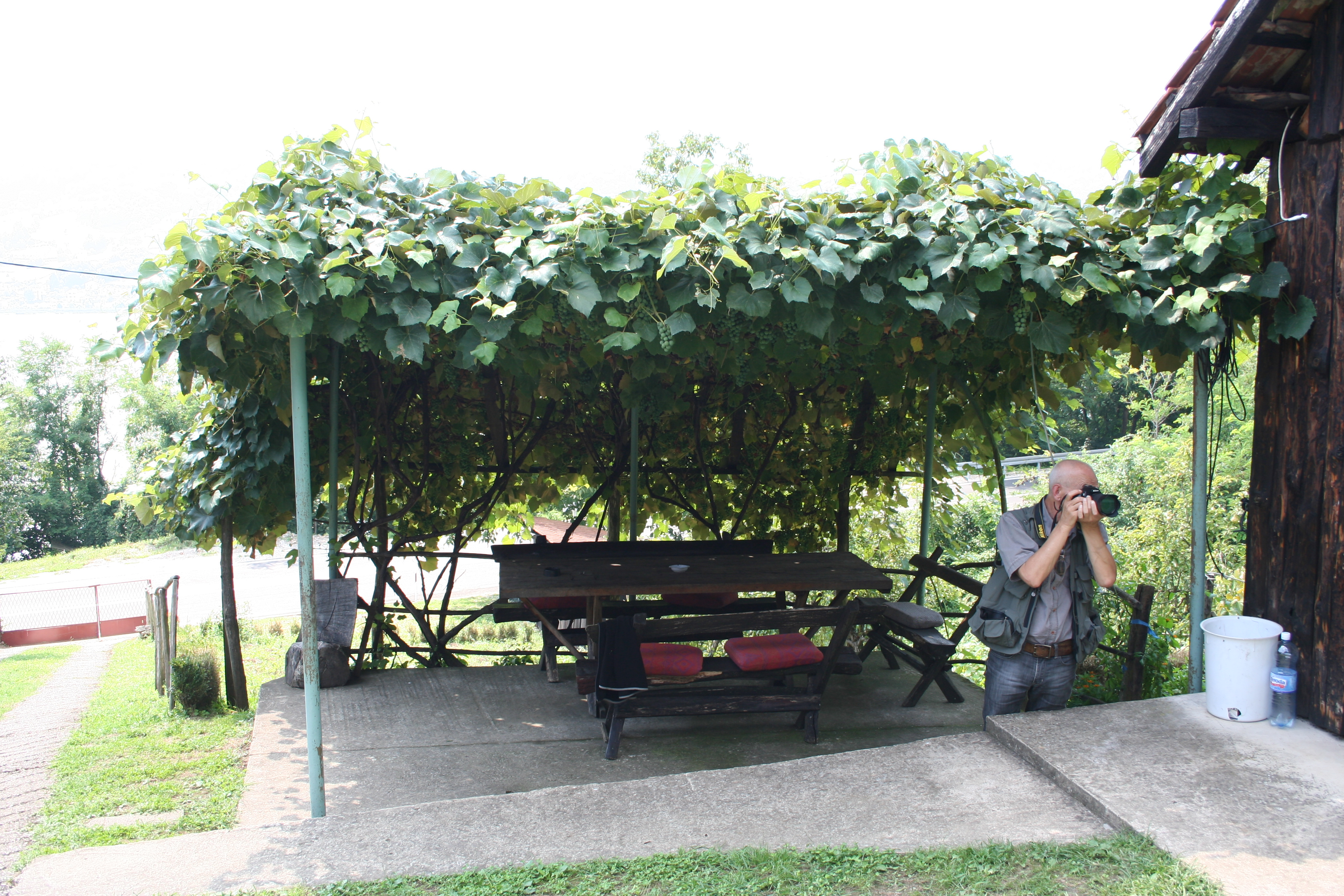
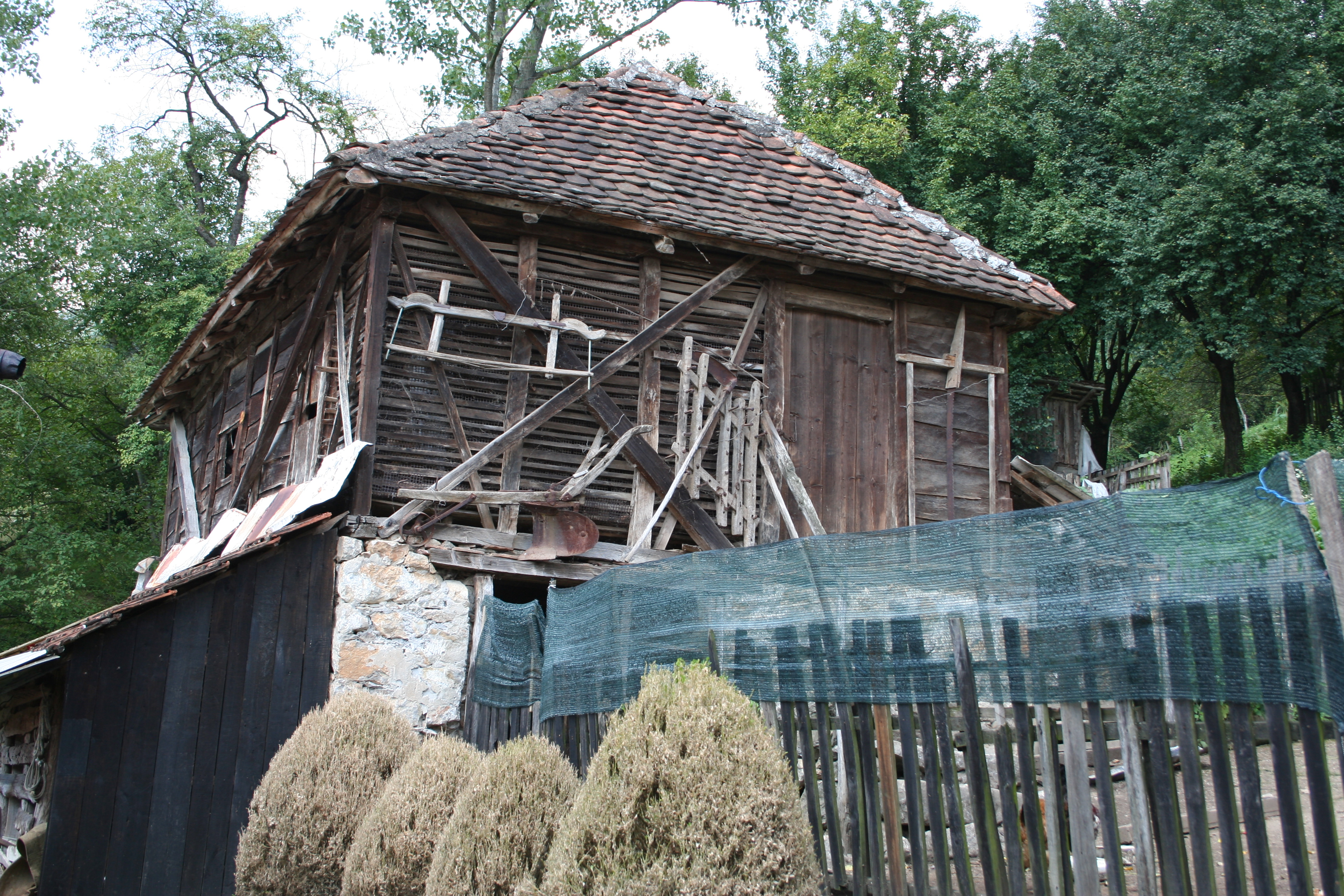
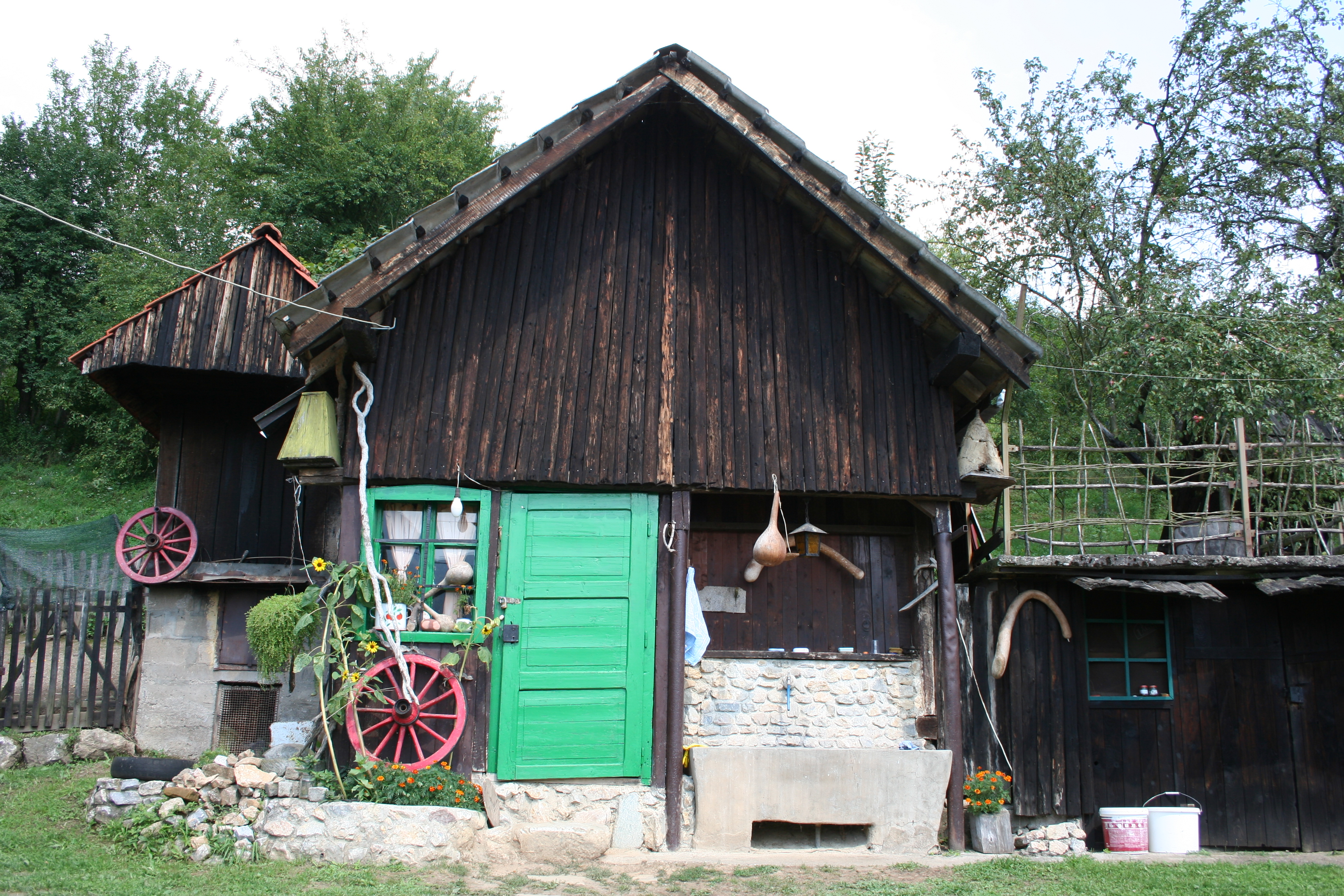
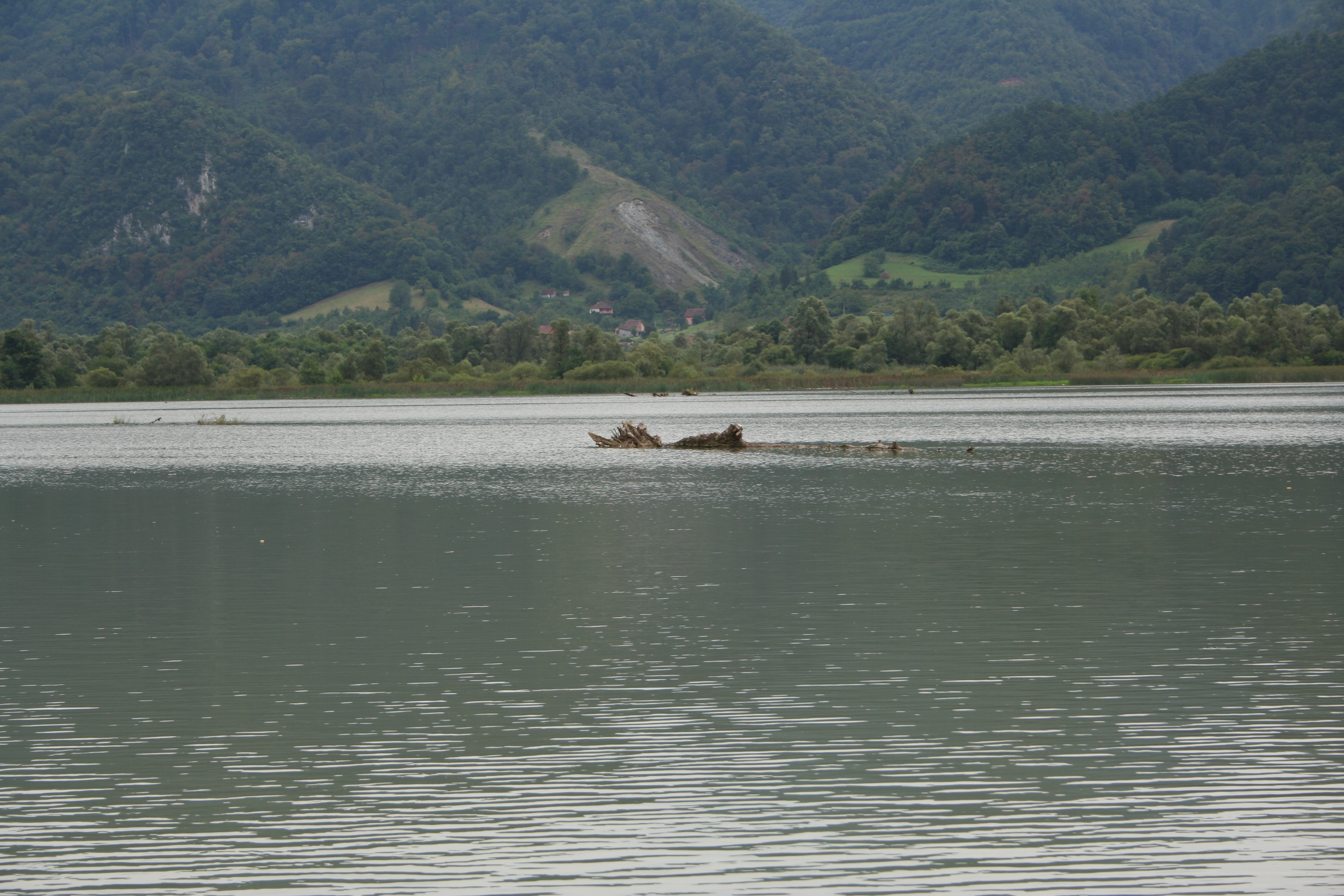
- Interactive map of Culine
- Country: Serbia
- Municipality: Mali Zvornik
- Time zone: UTC+1 (CET)
  - Summer (DST): UTC+2 (CEST)

Culine (Serbian Cyrillic: Цулине) is a village in Serbia. It is situated in the Mali Zvornik municipality, in the Mačva District of Central Serbia. The village has a Serb ethnic majority and its population was 389 in 2002.

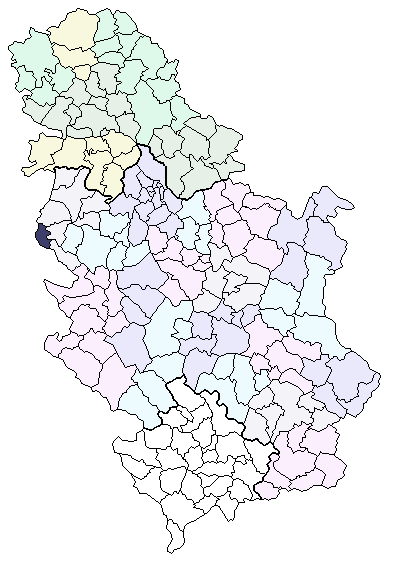
Location of the Mali Zvornik municipality in Serbia

== Historical population ==
- 1948: 688
- 1953: 711
- 1961: 544
- 1971: 516
- 1981: 495
- 1991: 429
- 2002: 389

Historical population
Year	Pop.	±%
1948	688	—
1953	711	+3.3%
1961	544	−23.5%
1971	516	−5.1%
1981	495	−4.1%
1991	429	−13.3%
2002	389	−9.3%
2011	291	−25.2%

== See also ==
- List of places in Serbia
