= Donja Borina =

Donja Borina Доња Борина
- Village (Selo)
- Location within Serbia
- Coordinates: 44°26′N 19°09′E
- Country: Serbia
- Municipality: Mali Zvornik
- Time zone: UTC+1 (CET)
  - Summer (DST): UTC+2 (CEST)

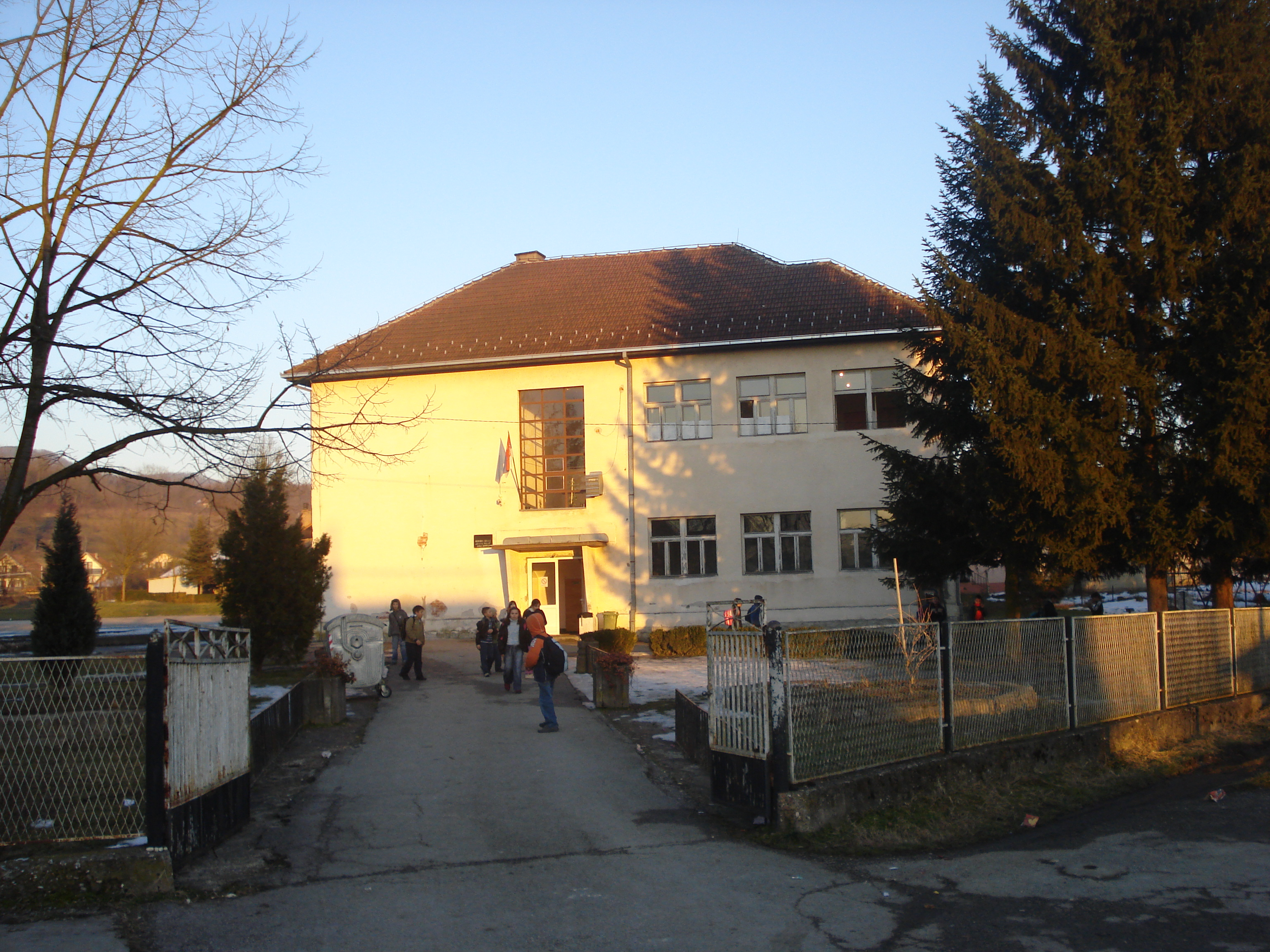
Center of Donja Borina Primary school Braca Ribar

Donja Borina (Serbian Cyrillic: Доња Борина) is a village in Serbia. It is situated in the Mali Zvornik municipality, in the Mačva District of Central Serbia. The village has a Serb ethnic majority and its population was 1,731 in 2002.

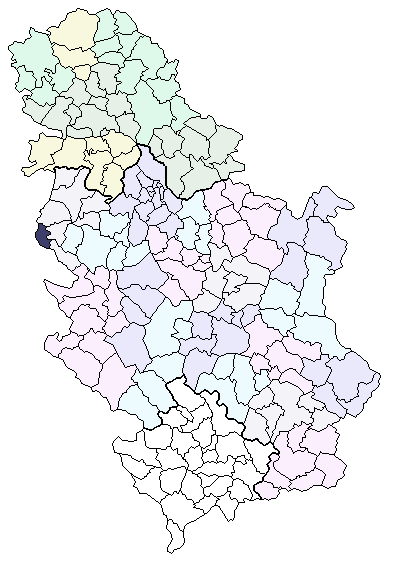
Location of the Mali Zvornik municipality in Serbia

- 1948: 1,187
- 1953: 1,290
- 1961: 1,395
- 1971: 1,446
- 1981: 1,521
- 1991: 1,707
- 2002: 1,731

Historical population
Year	Pop.	±%
1948	1,187	—
1953	1,290	+8.7%
1961	1,395	+8.1%
1971	1,446	+3.7%
1981	1,521	+5.2%
1991	1,707	+12.2%
2002	1,731	+1.4%
2011	1,523	−12.0%

== About village ==
Donja Borina consists of two major settlements Batar and Andraca. For any of them they do not know exactly how they got the name. Batar is much more urban than Andraca, there is a church, primary school, post and cultural center, where is the local administration.

Andraca is a part of the village where people are mostly deal with agriculture, limekiln and selling of timber. Other hamlets are: Dedinje, Stojanovici, Petkovici, Kikanovici, Pavlovici, Filipovici, Lepenica and Gucevo.

== Popular Places ==
Certainly the most attractive part of the village is located near the Drina river, along which there are two restaurants.

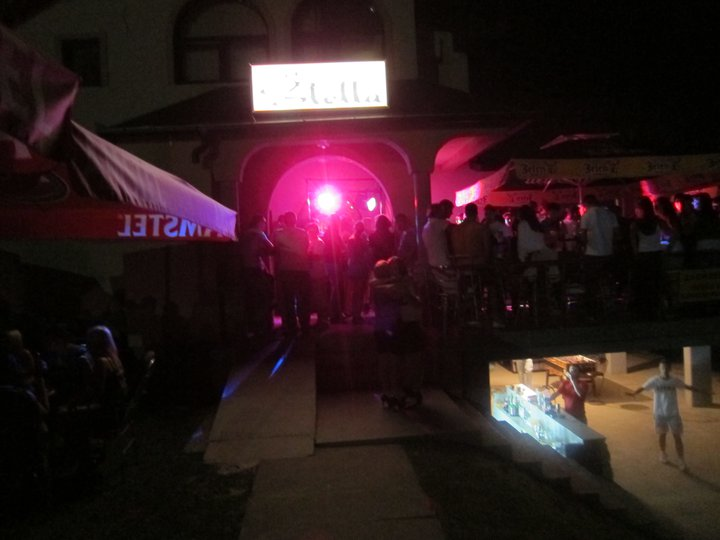
Donja Borina caffe Stella

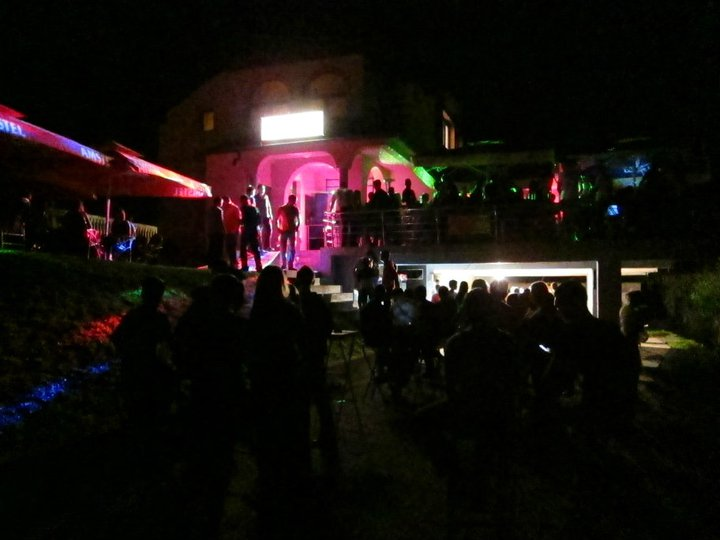
Caffe Stella

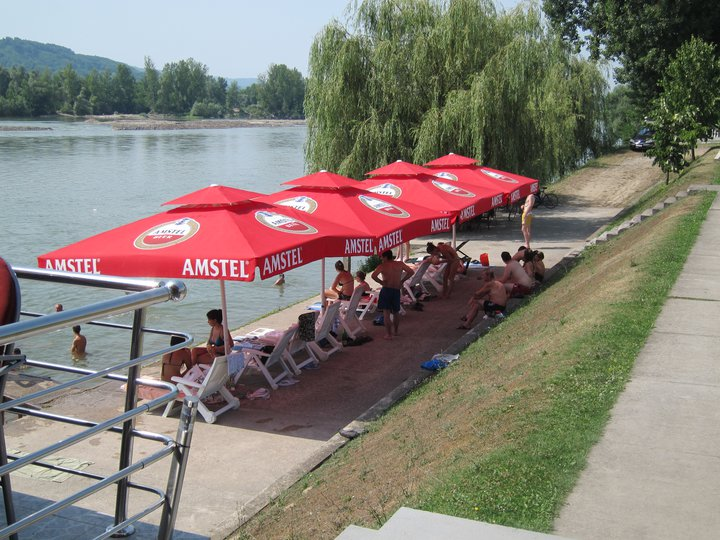
Drina´s beach

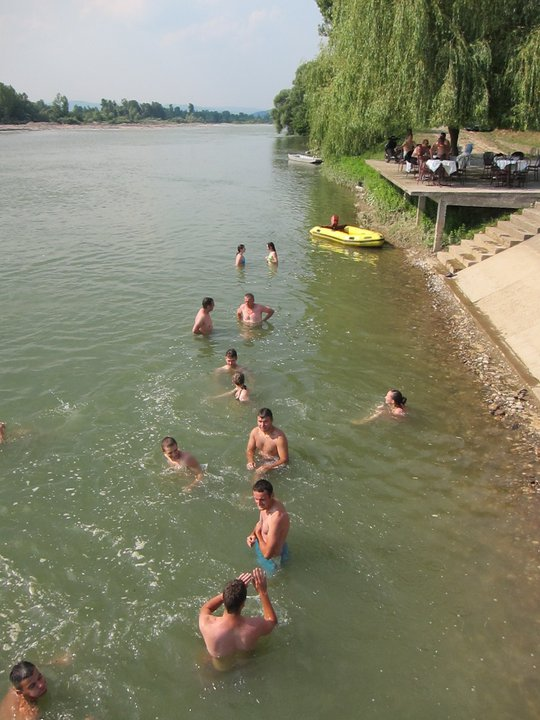
Summer in Donja Borina

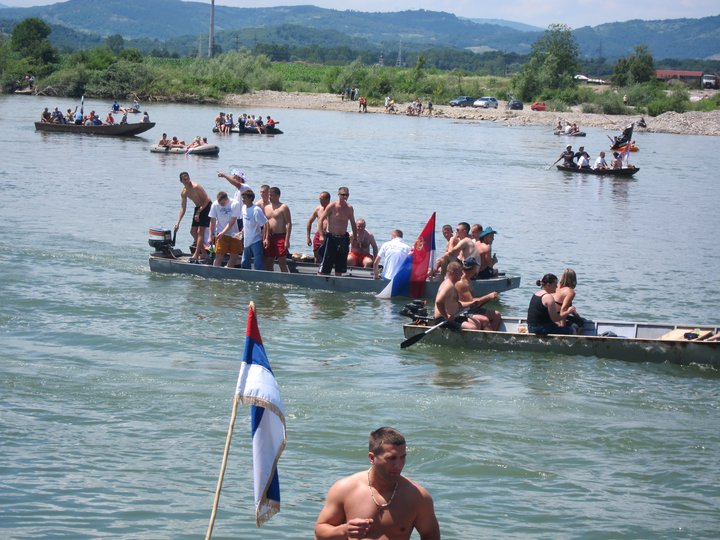
Drina

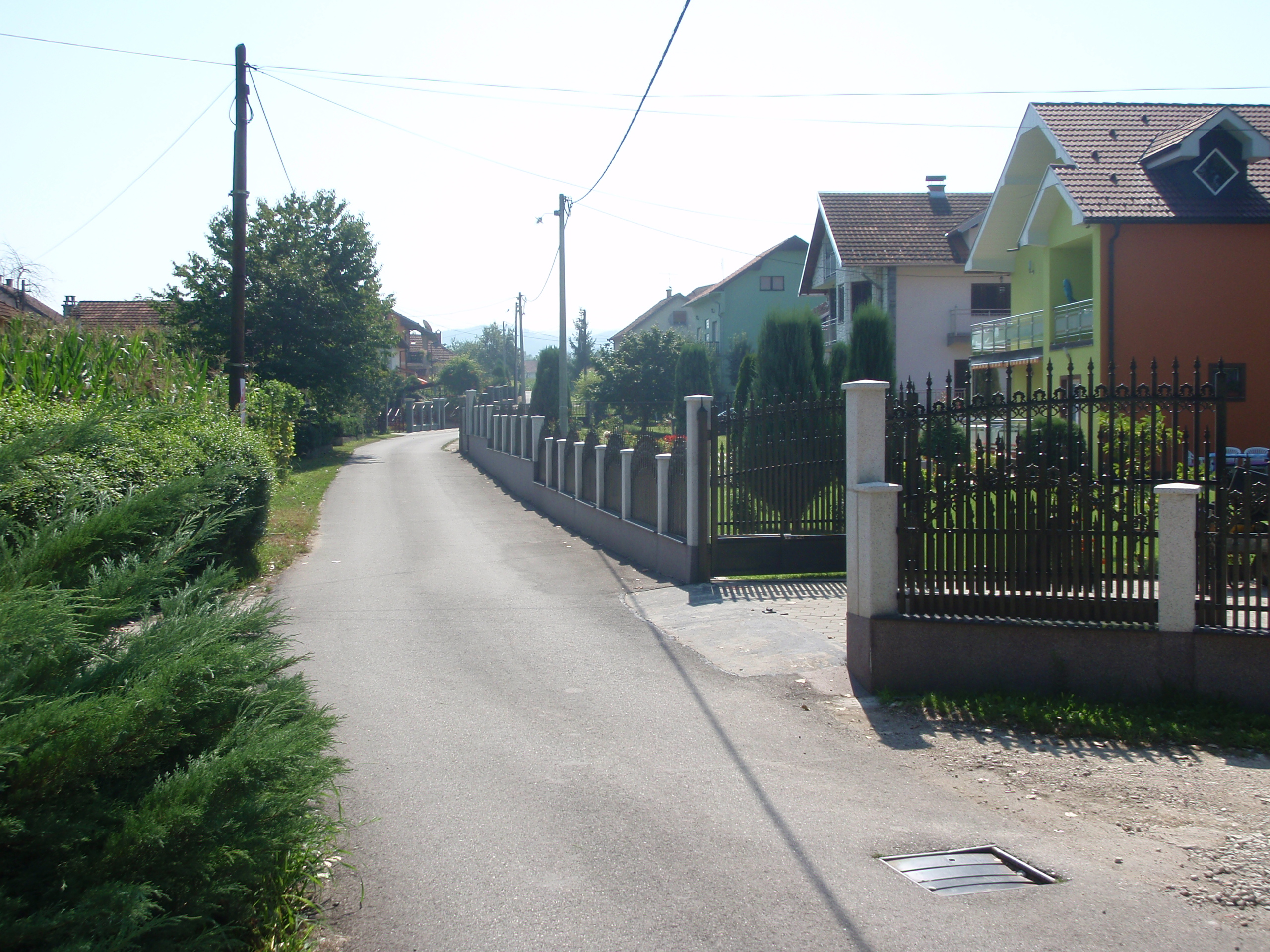
Donja Borina-Street

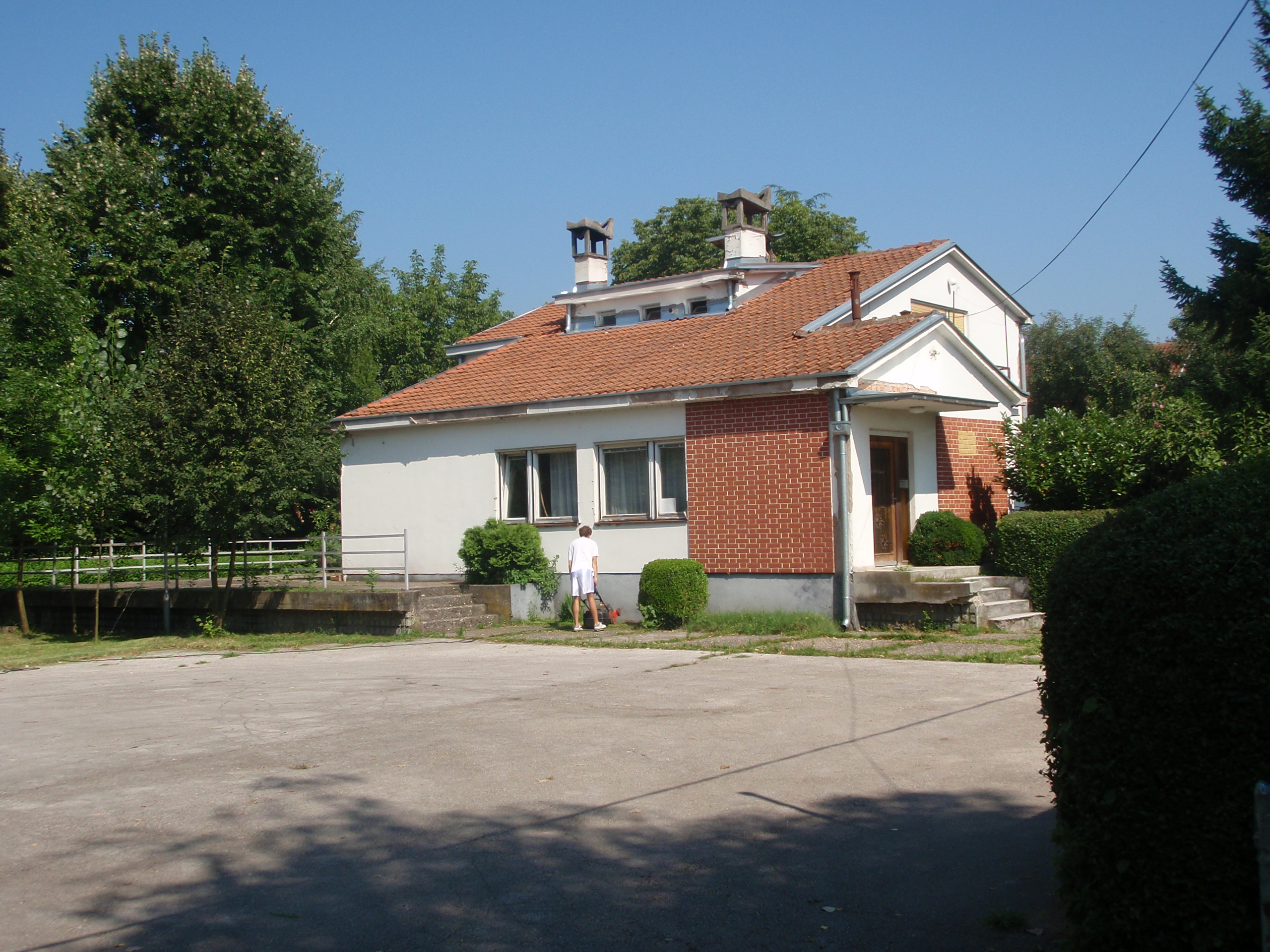
Donja Borina-Restaurant Mladica

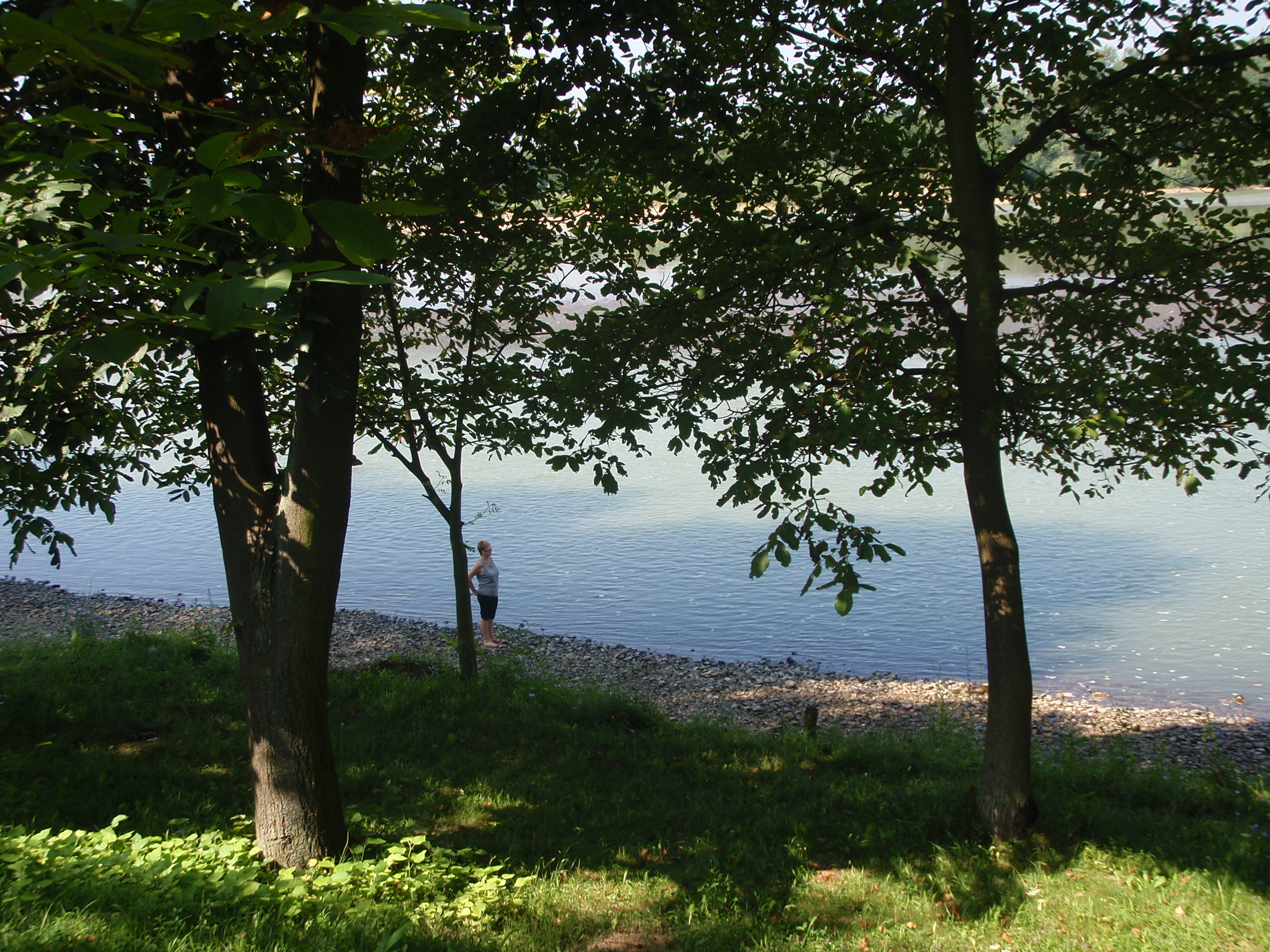
Drina river

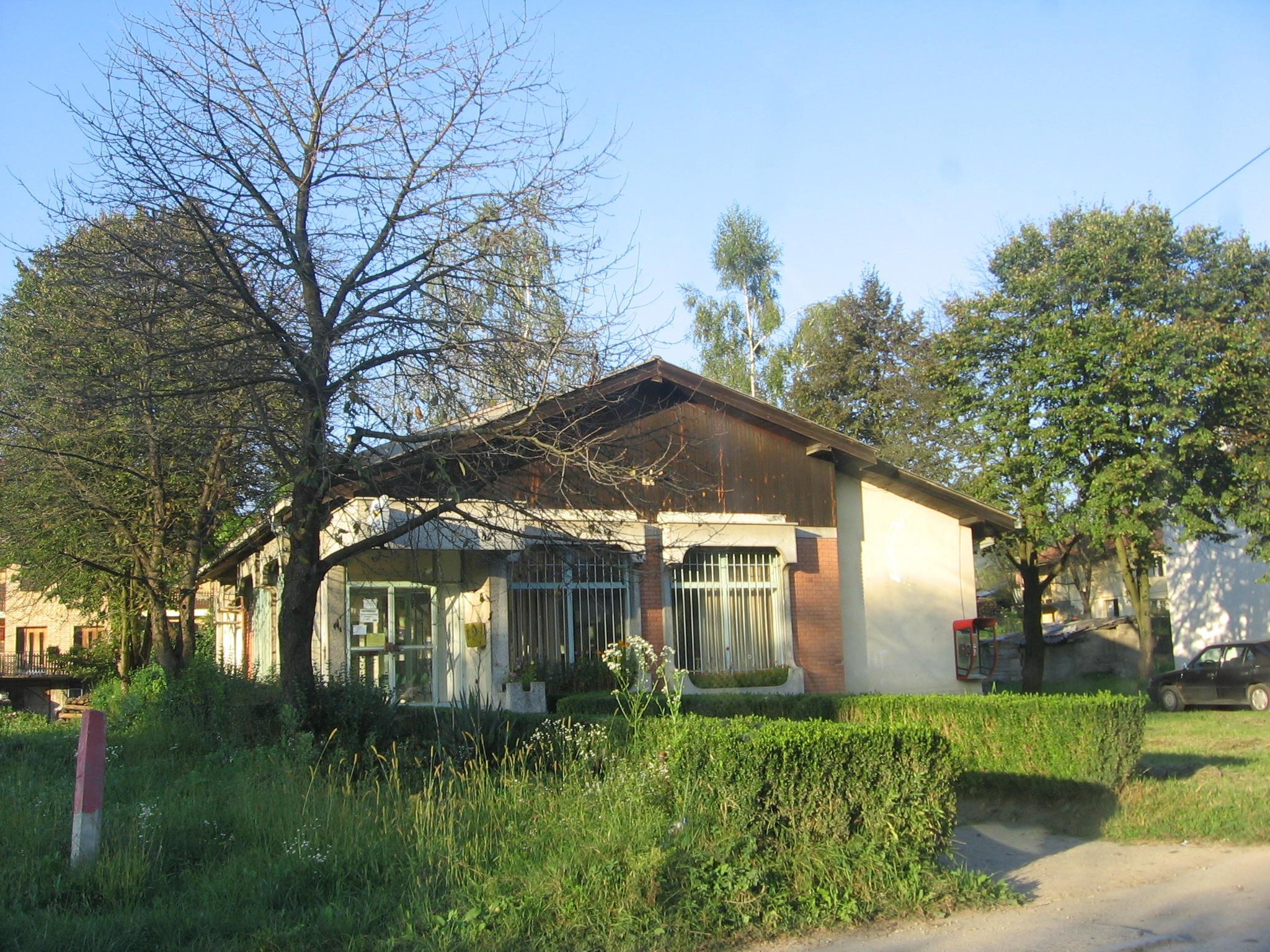
Donja Borina-Post

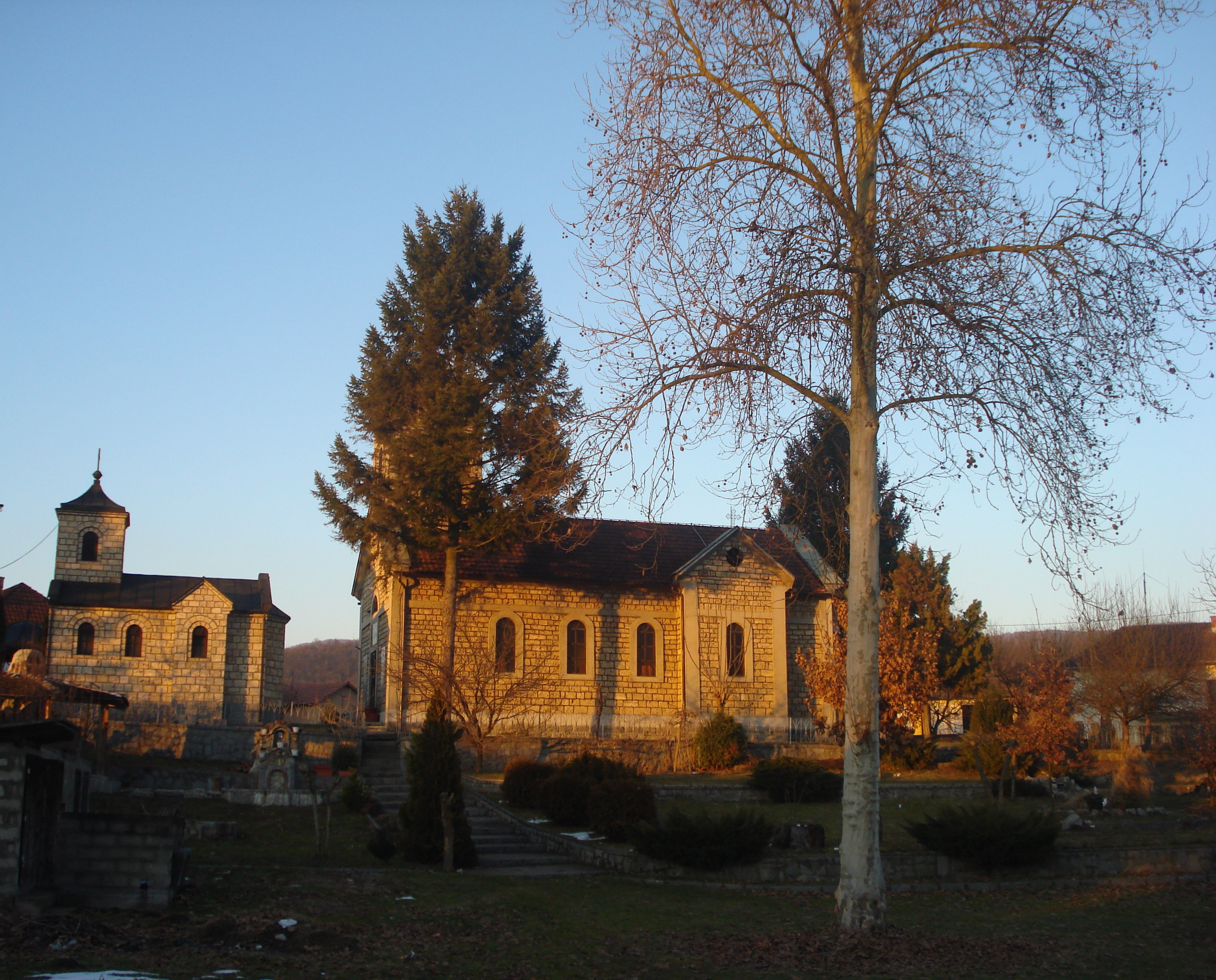
Donja Borina-Church

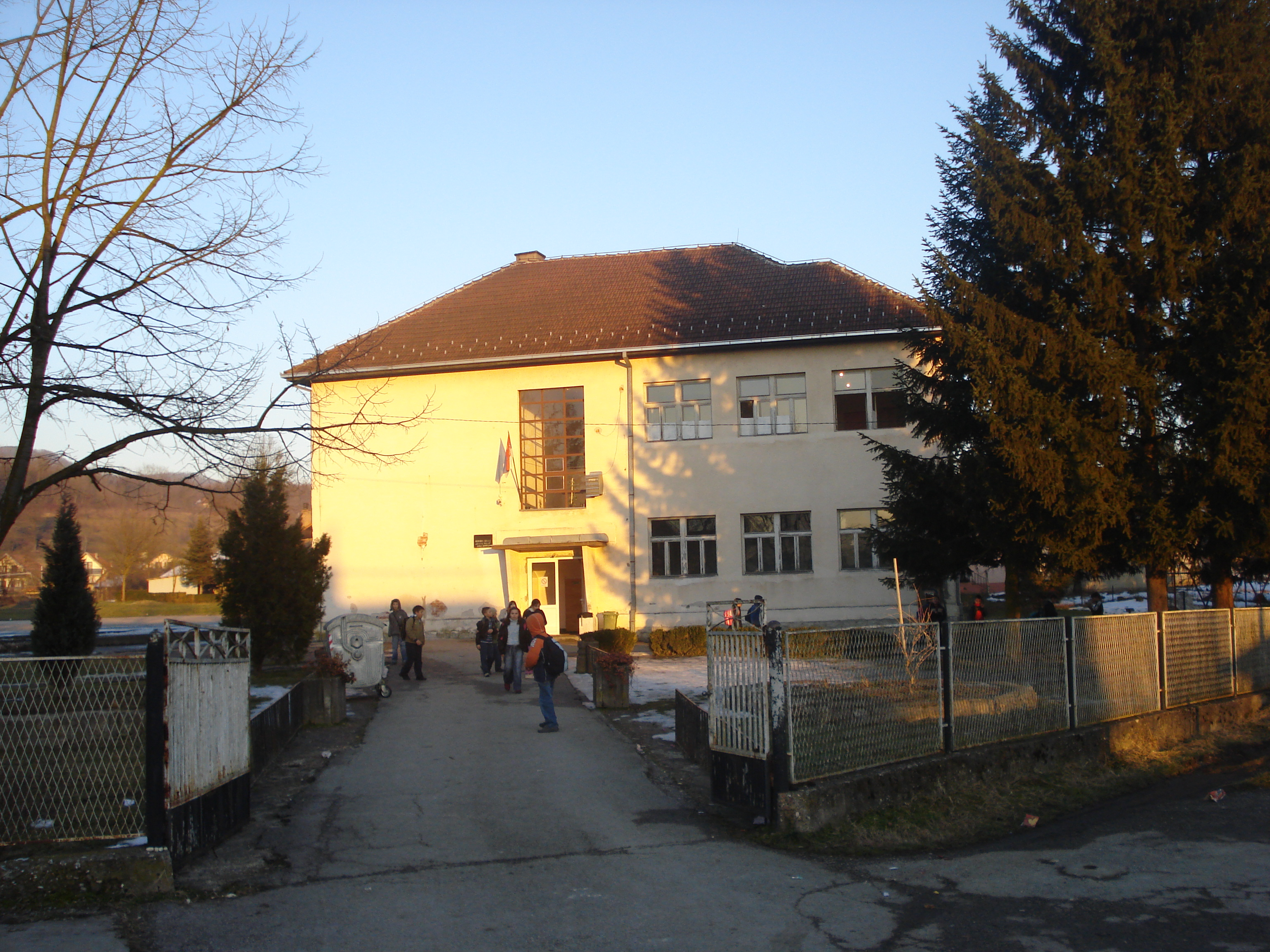
Primary school "Braca Ribar"

== See also ==
- Website Donja i Gornja Borina
- List of places in Serbia
