= Voljevci =

Voljevci Вољевци
- Village (Selo)
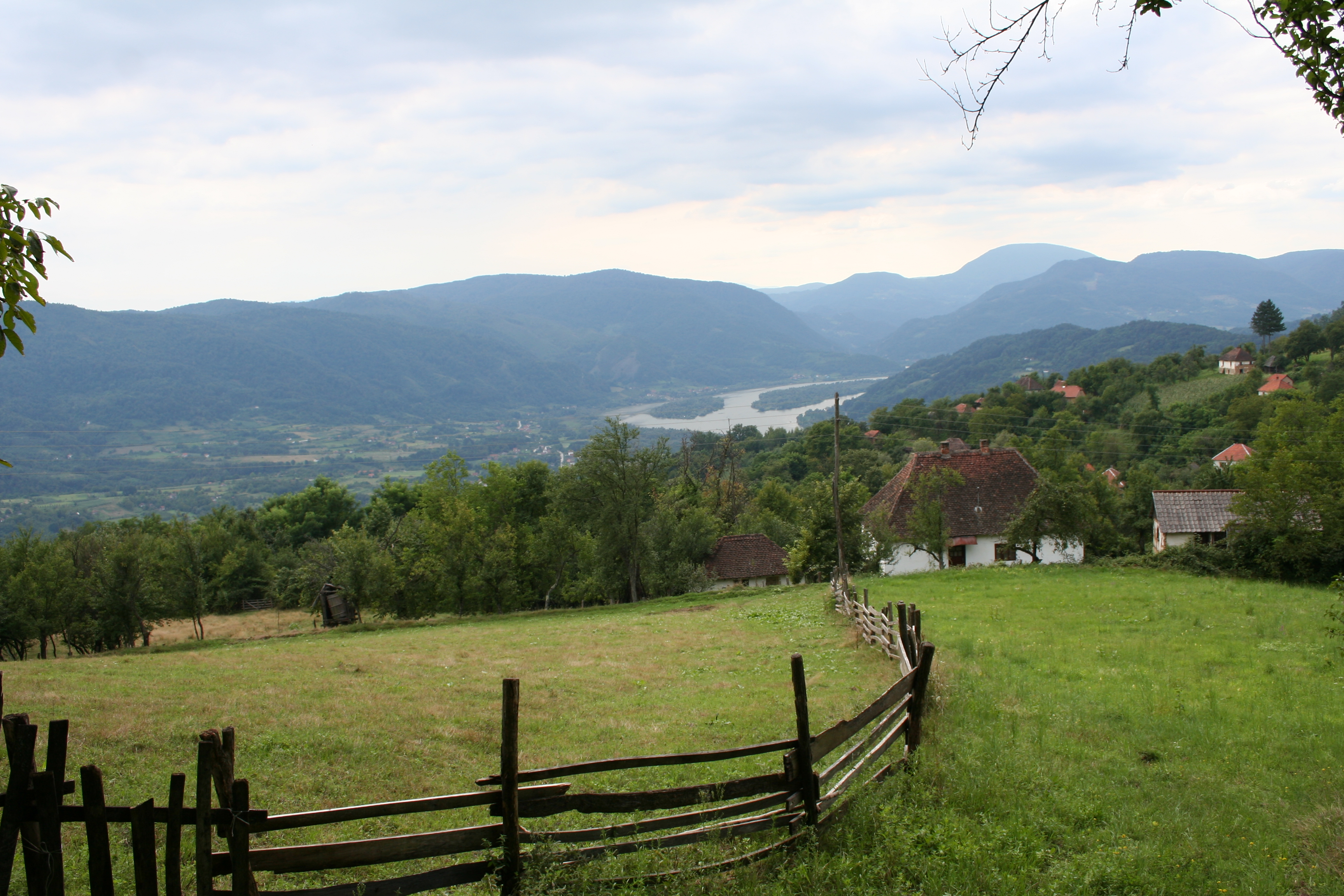

- Location within Serbia
- Coordinates: 44°17′N 19°14′E
- Country: Serbia
- Municipality: Mali Zvornik
- Time zone: UTC+1 (CET)
  - Summer (DST): UTC+2 (CEST)

Voljevci (Serbian Cyrillic: Вољевци) is a village in Serbia. It is situated in the Mali Zvornik municipality, in the Mačva District of Central Serbia. The village has a Serb ethnic majority and its population in 2002 was 719, of whom 702 were Serbs.

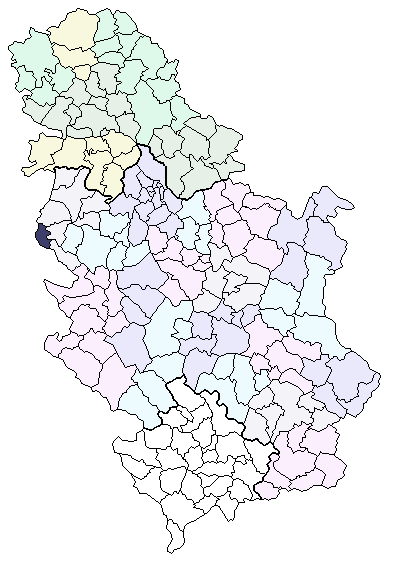
Location of the Mali Zvornik municipality in Serbia

== History ==
The origin of the name Voljevci is rooted in the local mountain history. According to preserved oral accounts, there was a famous miner, Petar Voljevac, of Orthodox faith, who spoke the “western” dialect. He is said to have been a former master in a mine. Having gone beyond the Sava River, where he reportedly found work in other mines, he returned with several families, among them the Voljevci, whom he brought back to the region. At that time, only two Voljevci houses remained, located near Rebelj; they reportedly disappeared by merging with the new arrivals, the Ivanovići, and became extinct without a male heir.

The Todorović are originally from Outre-Drina Popovici, likely from the village of Popovici. Their ancestor is said to have entered the household by alliance (through a daughter), which led to a change of Slava (5 houses; Saint George). Today, only four houses of this family remain in the village, descending from Mladen (vojvoda).

== Historical population ==
- 1948: 677
- 1953: 739
- 1961: 763
- 1971: 730
- 1981: 847
- 1991: 780
- 2002: 719

Historical population
| Year | Pop. | ±% |
|---|---|---|
| 1948 | 677 | — |
| 1953 | 739 | +9.2% |
| 1961 | 763 | +3.2% |
| 1971 | 730 | −4.3% |
| 1981 | 847 | +16.0% |
| 1991 | 780 | −7.9% |
| 2002 | 719 | −7.8% |
| 2011 | 617 | −14.2% |

== See also ==
- List of places in Serbia
