= Mali Zvornik =

Mali Zvornik Мали Зворник (Serbian)
- Town and municipality
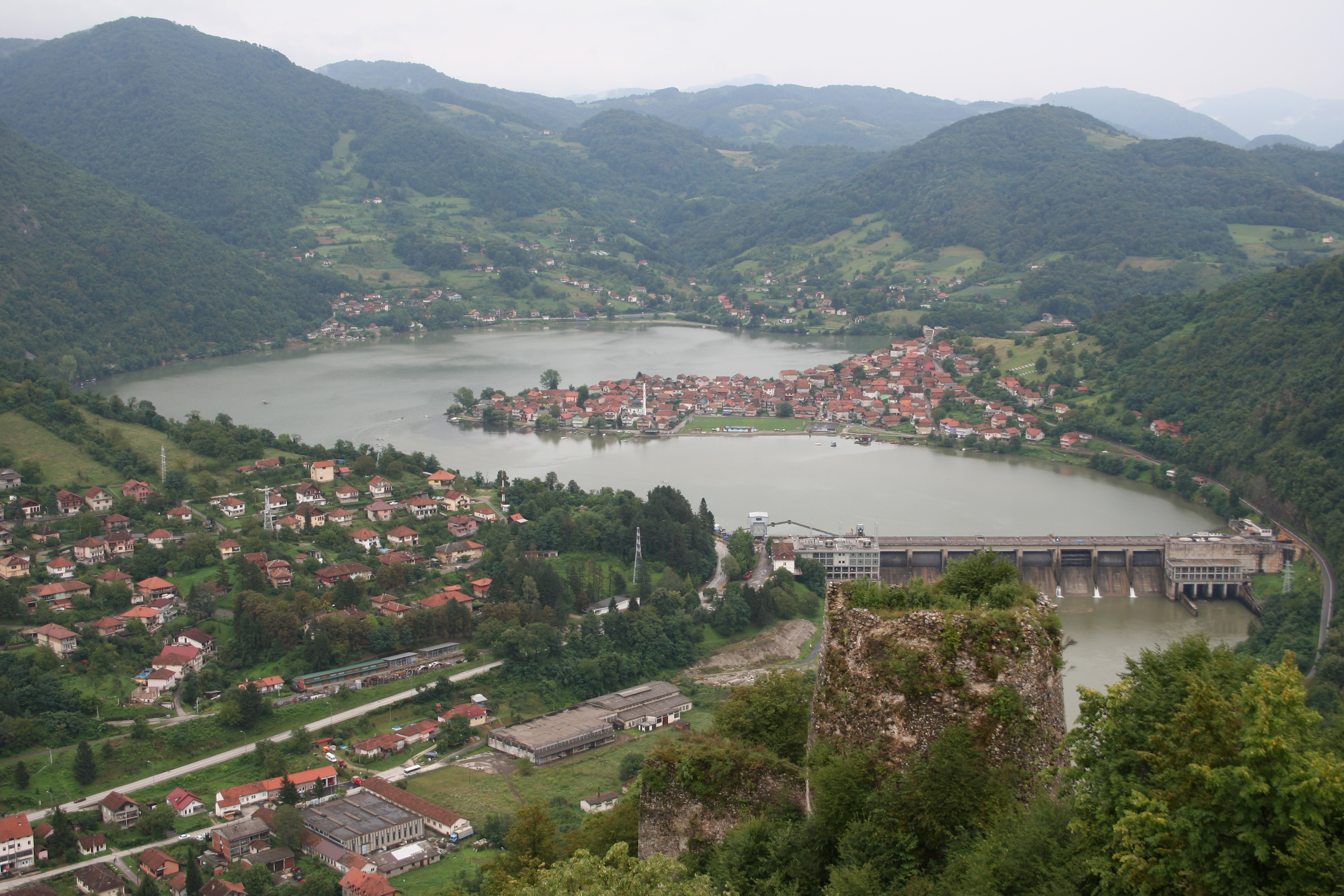
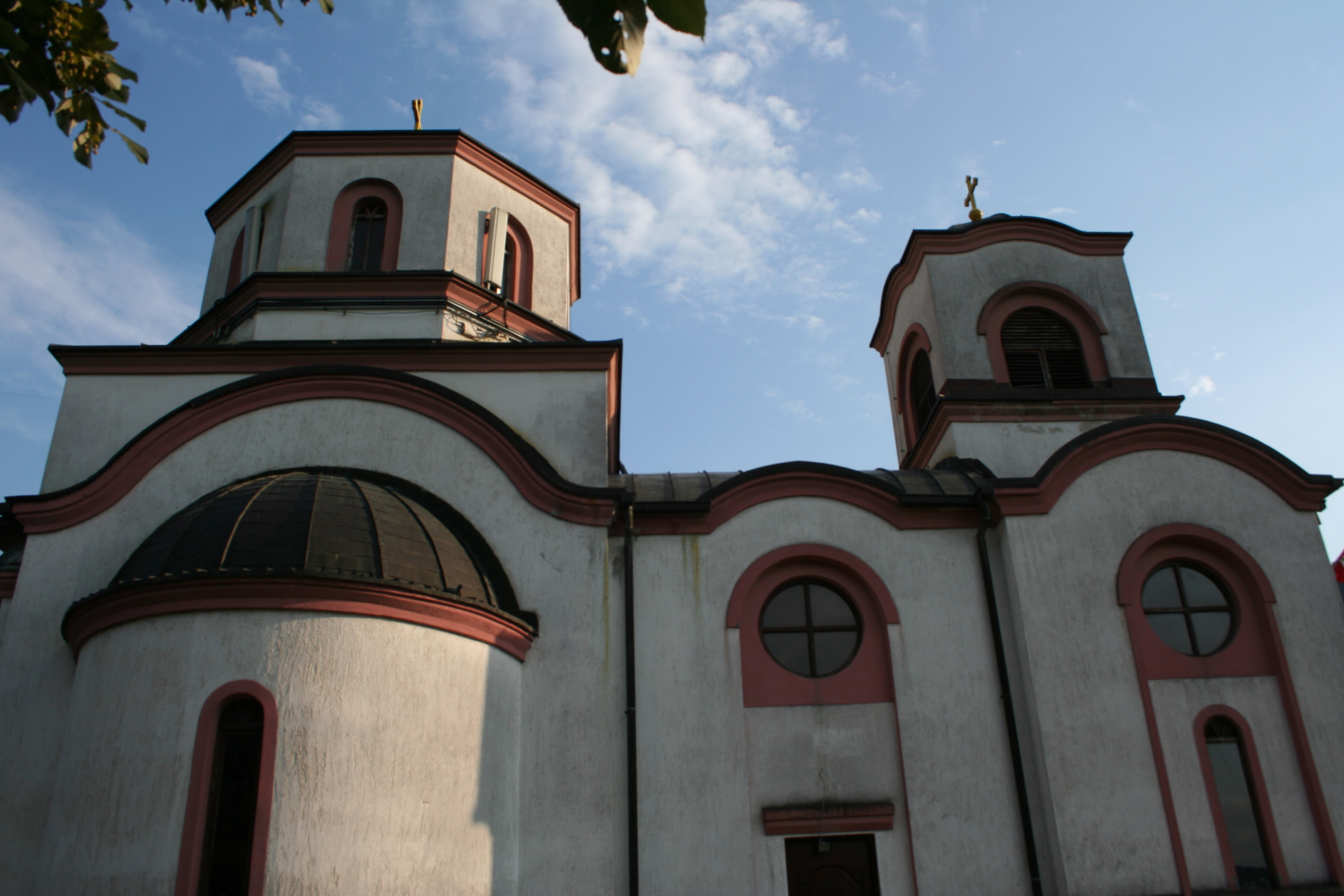
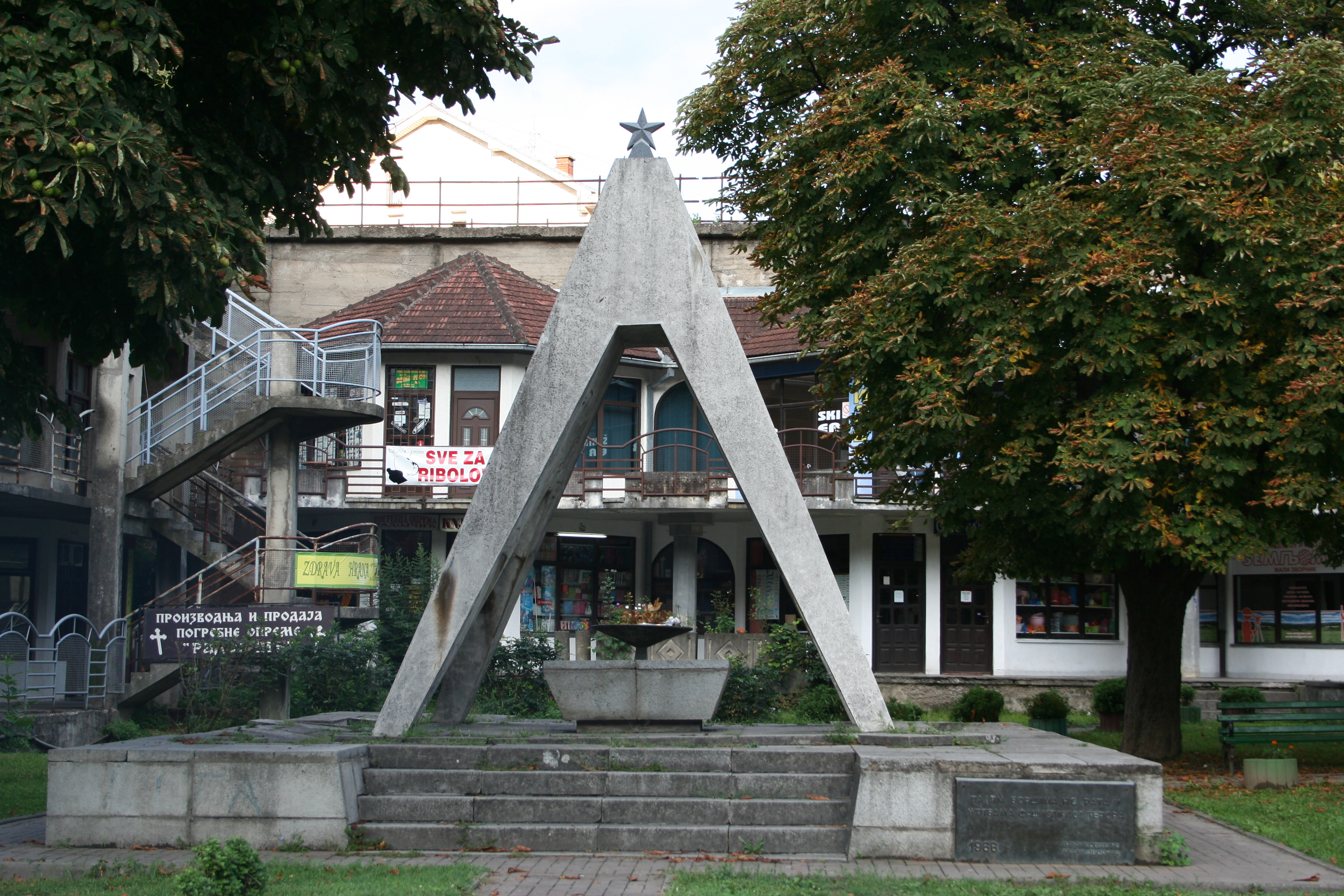
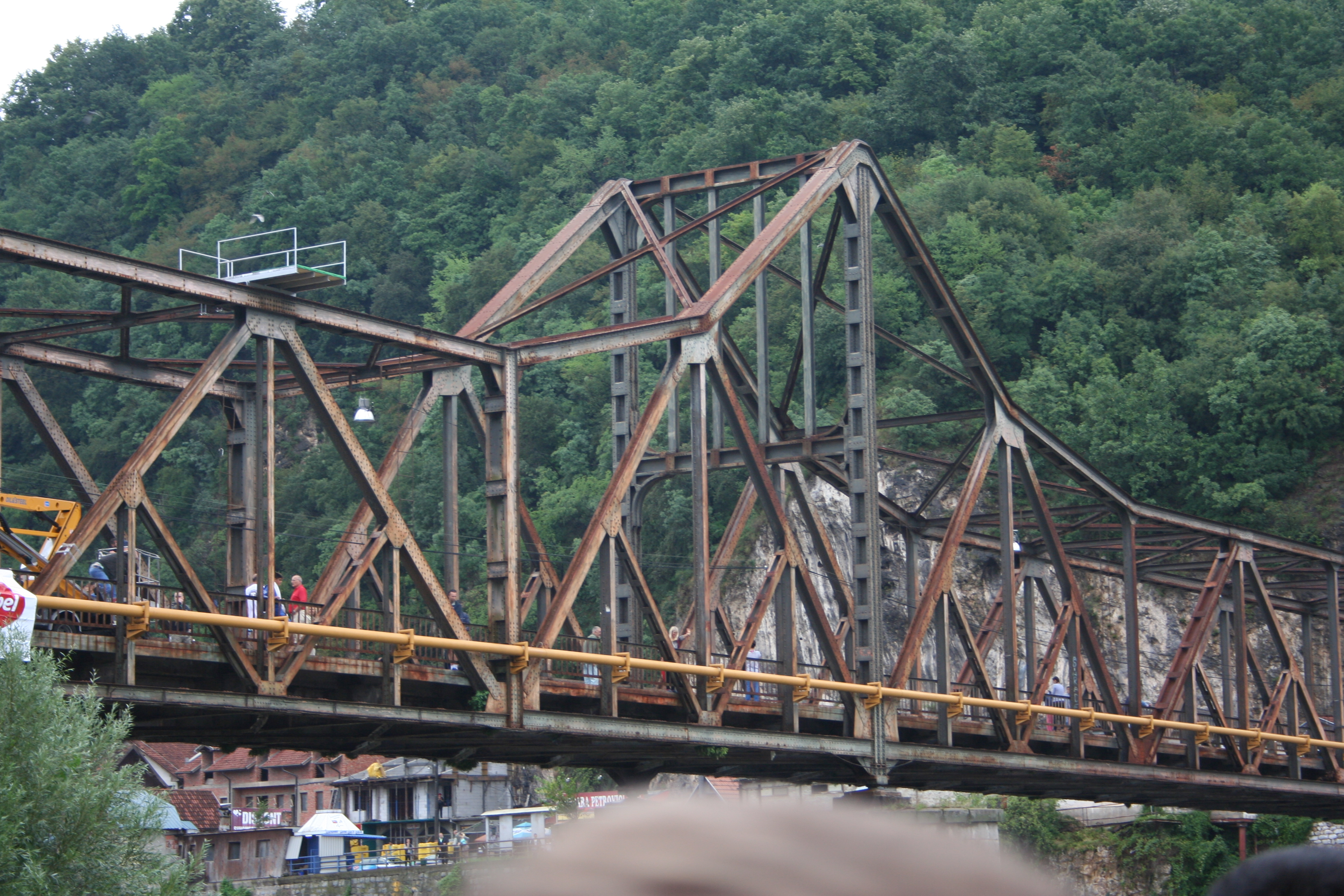
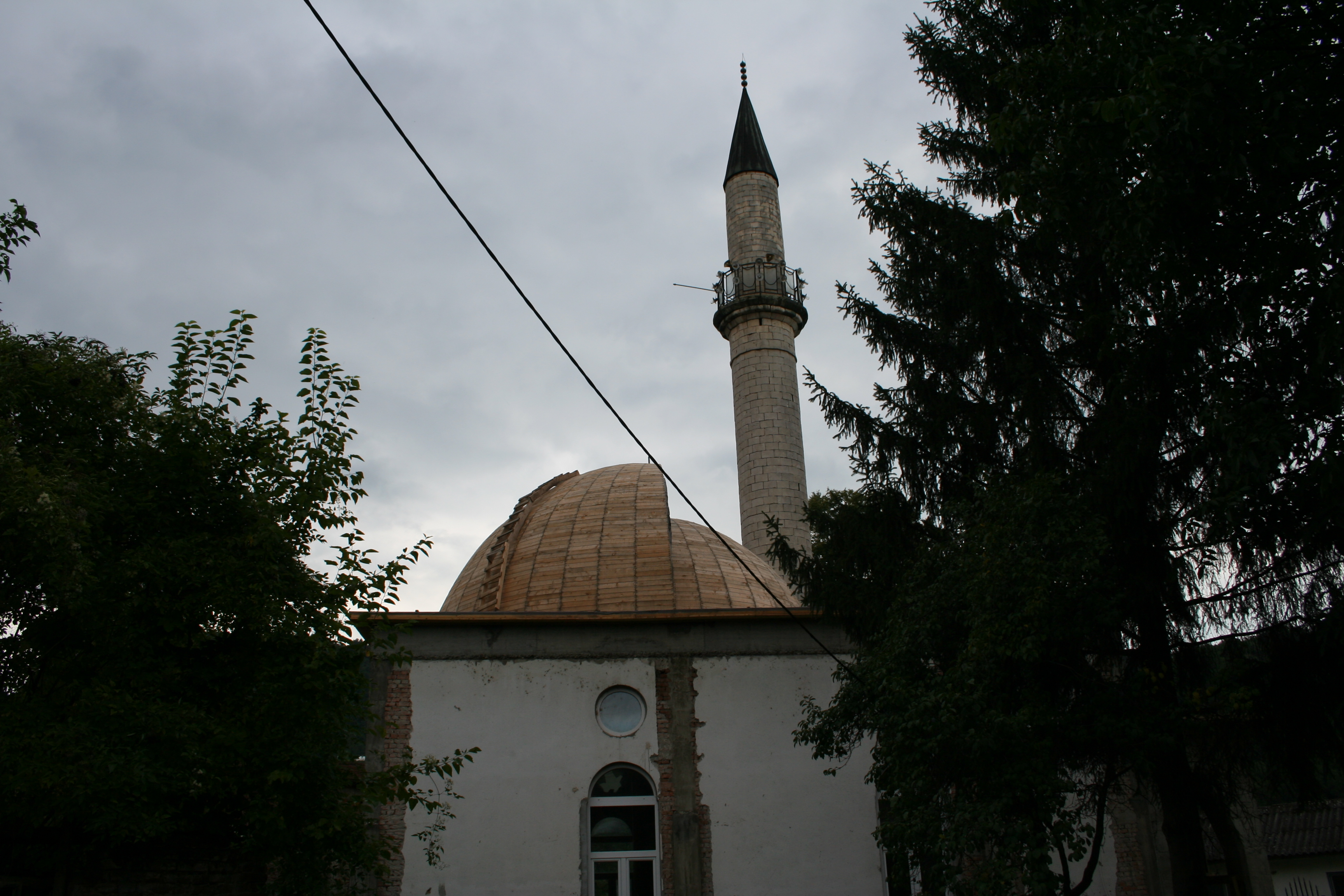
- Mali Zvornik

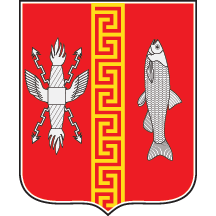
- Coat of arms

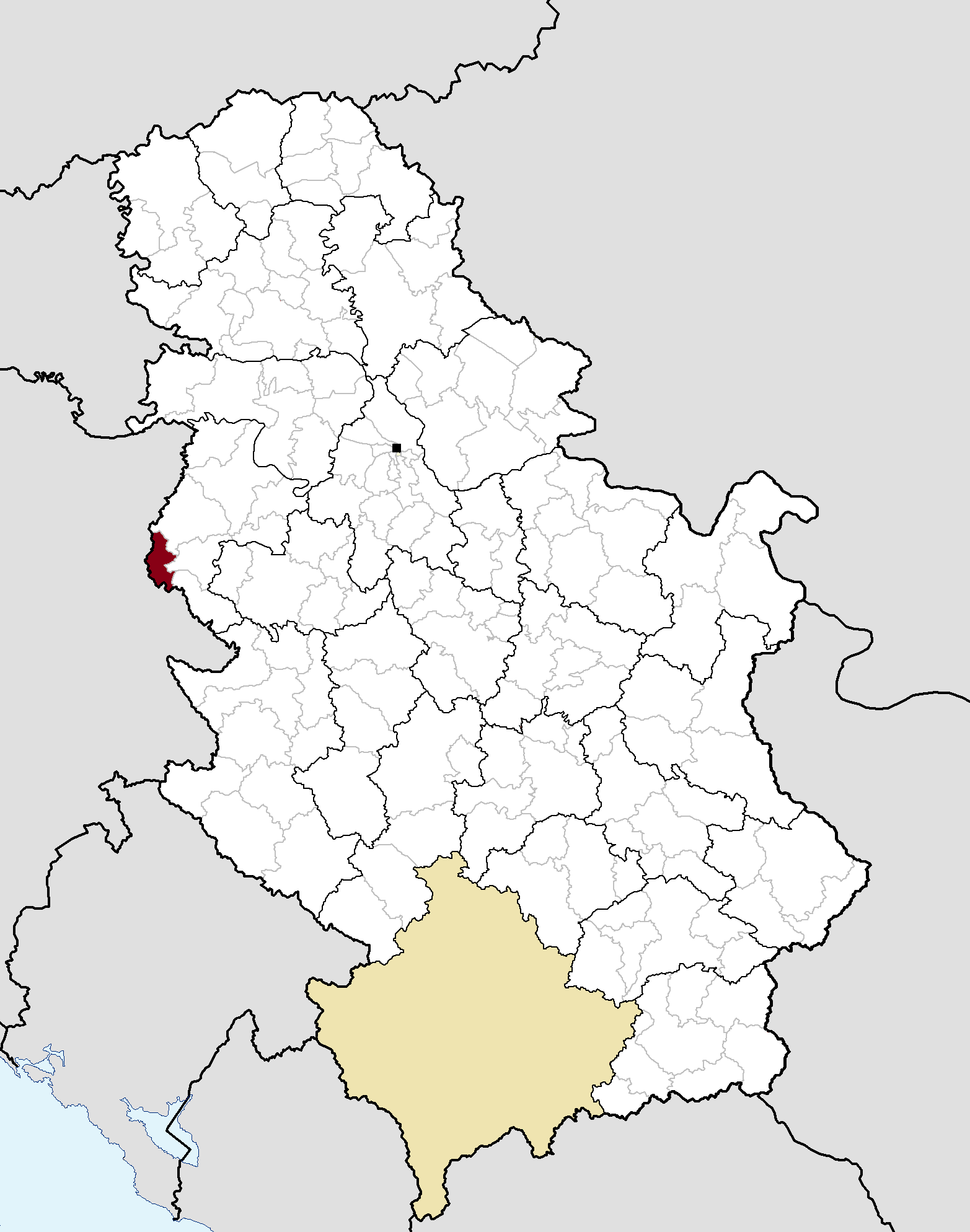
- Location of the municipality of Mali Zvornik within Serbia
- Coordinates: 44°24′N 19°07′E
- Country: Serbia
- Region: Šumadija and Western Serbia
- District: Mačva
- Municipality: 1955; 71 years ago
- Settlements: 12

Government
  - Mayor: Zoran Jevtić (SNS)

Area
  - Town: 9.09 km^{2} (3.51 sq mi)
  - Municipality: 184 km^{2} (71 sq mi)
- Elevation: 149 m (489 ft)

Population (2022 census)
  - Town: 4,297
  - Town density: 473/km^{2} (1,220/sq mi)
  - Municipality: 11,219
  - Municipality density: 61.0/km^{2} (158/sq mi)
- Time zone: UTC+1 (CET)
  - Summer (DST): UTC+2 (CEST)
- Postal code: 15318
- Area code: +381(0)15
- Car plates: LO
- Website: www.malizvornik.rs

Mali Zvornik (Serbian Cyrillic: Мали Зворник, pronounced [mâːliː zʋɔ̌rniːk]) is a town and municipality located in the Mačva District of western Serbia. In 2022, the population of the town was 4,297, while the population of the municipality was 11,219. It lies on the Drina river opposite of the town of Zvornik, in Bosnia and Herzegovina. Also, a border crossing between Serbia and Bosnia and Herzegovina is located in the town.

== History ==
There are traces of human life from the Bronze Age in this area, as well as traces from the time of the Roman Empire. Ancient Roman settlement Ad Drinum existed somewhere at this location. In the Middle Ages, Mali Zvornik was one of the main mining centres of the Serbian state.

On Orlovine Hill near Mali Zvornik there are remains of the large Medieval fortress that was probably built in the first half of the 15th century, in the time of the Serbian Despotate. During the Ottoman rule, this area was part of the Pashaluk of Bosnia.

Until 1878 it was the only Bosnian municipality on the right side of the river Drina, when it eventually became part of the independent Kingdom of Serbia. At the end of the 19th and beginning of the 20th century, the population of Mali Zvornik numbered 115 houses. The municipality of Mali Zvornik was officially established in 1955.

== Settlements ==
Aside from the town of Mali Zvornik, the municipality includes the following settlements:

- Amajić
- Brasina
- Budišić
- Culine
- Čitluk
- Donja Borina
- Donja Trešnjica
- Radalj
- Sakar
- Velika Reka
- Voljevci

== Demographics ==
Historical population
Year	Pop.	±% p.a.
1948	9,036	—
1953	12,004	+5.84%
1961	11,583	−0.45%
1971	12,084	+0.42%
1981	13,074	+0.79%
1991	14,029	+0.71%
2002	14,076	+0.03%
2011	12,482	−1.33%
2022	11,219	−0.97%

According to the 2022 census, the municipality of Mali Zvornik has 11,219 inhabitants.

=== Ethnic groups ===
The municipality of Mali Zvornik has many ethnic groups, with Serbs forming the majority in all settlements. The ethnic composition of the municipality of Mali Zvornik:

Ethnic group	Population	%
Serbs	11,677	93.55%
Muslims	376	3.01%
Bosniaks	72	0.58%
Romani	25	0.20%
Montenegrins	16	0.13%
Yugoslavs	15	0.12%
Croats	14	0.11%
Others	287	2.30%
Total	12,482	

== Economy ==
The following table gives a preview of total number of employed people per their core activity (as of 2017):

Activity	Total
Agriculture, forestry and fishing	93
Mining	70
Processing industry	168
Distribution of power, gas and water	101
Distribution of water and water waste management	55
Construction	114
Wholesale and retail, repair	319
Traffic, storage and communication	187
Hotels and restaurants	70
Media and telecommunications	8
Finance and insurance	8
Property stock and charter	-
Professional, scientific, innovative and technical activities	45
Administrative and other services	18
Administration and social assurance	326
Education	177
Healthcare and social work	112
Art, leisure and recreation	17
Other services	29
Total	1,917

== Sports ==
Local football club Jedinstvo competes in the 6th tier of Serbia's football pyramid as of the 2025-26 season.

== Gallery ==
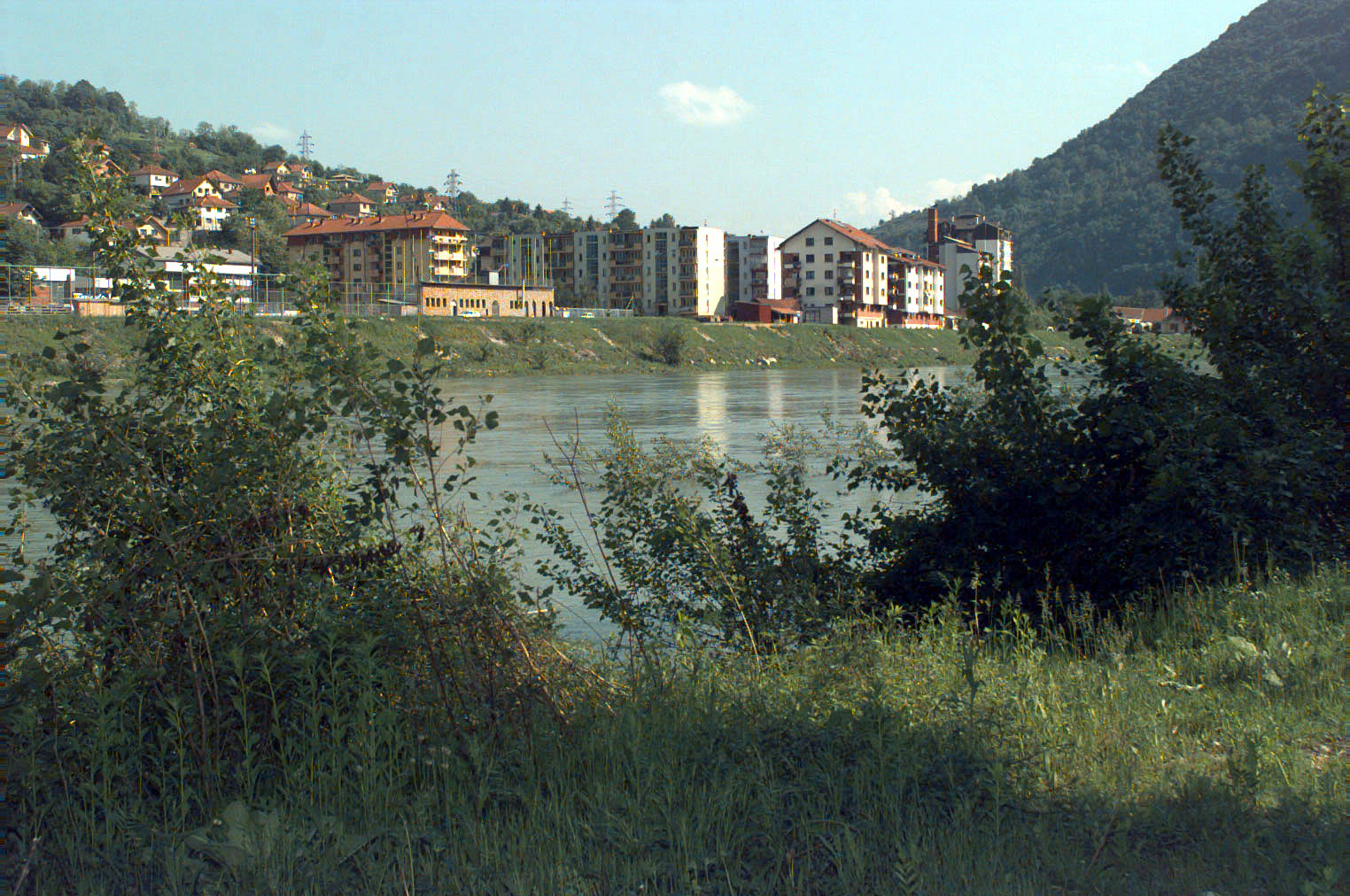
Mali Zvornik

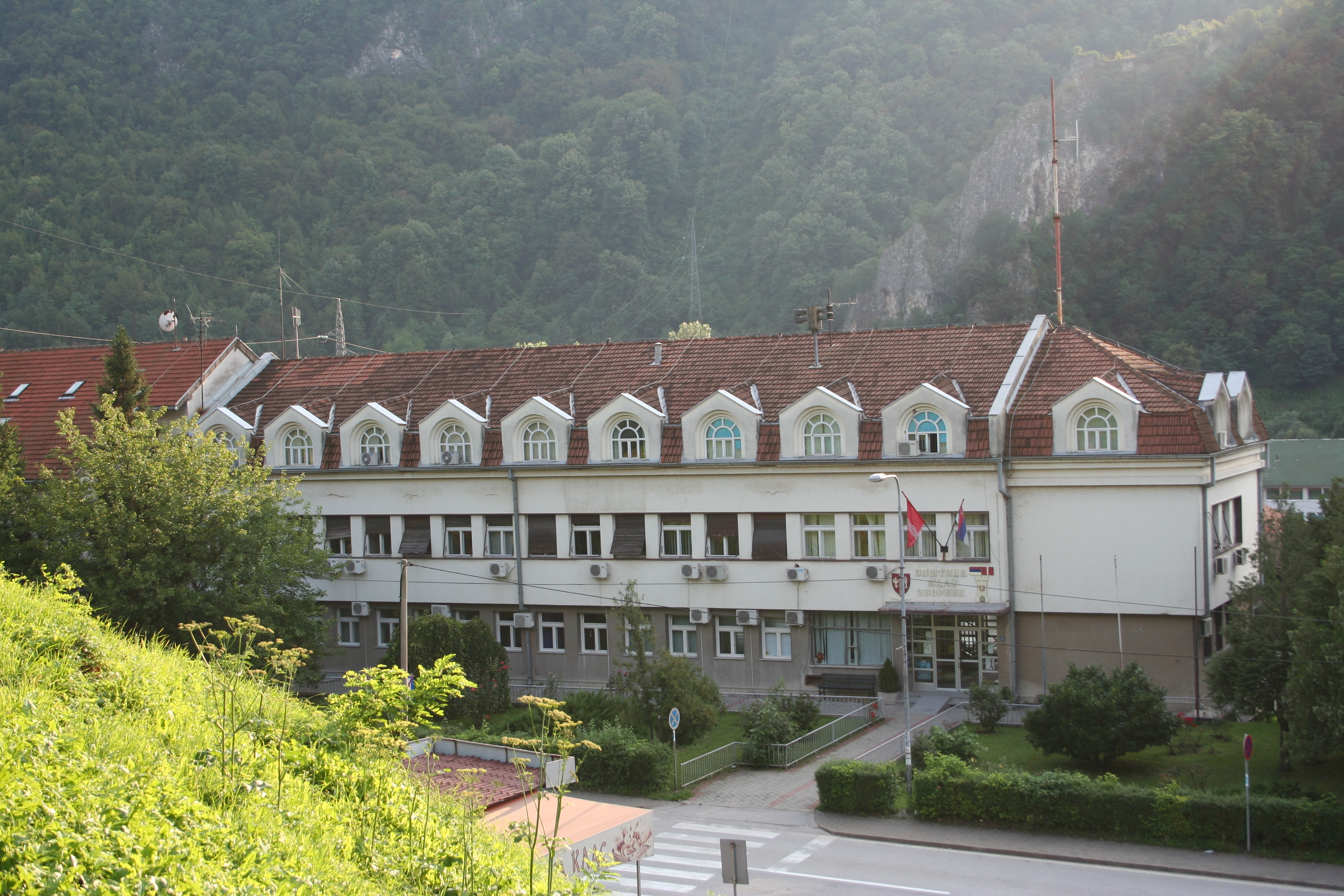
Mali Zvornik Municipal House

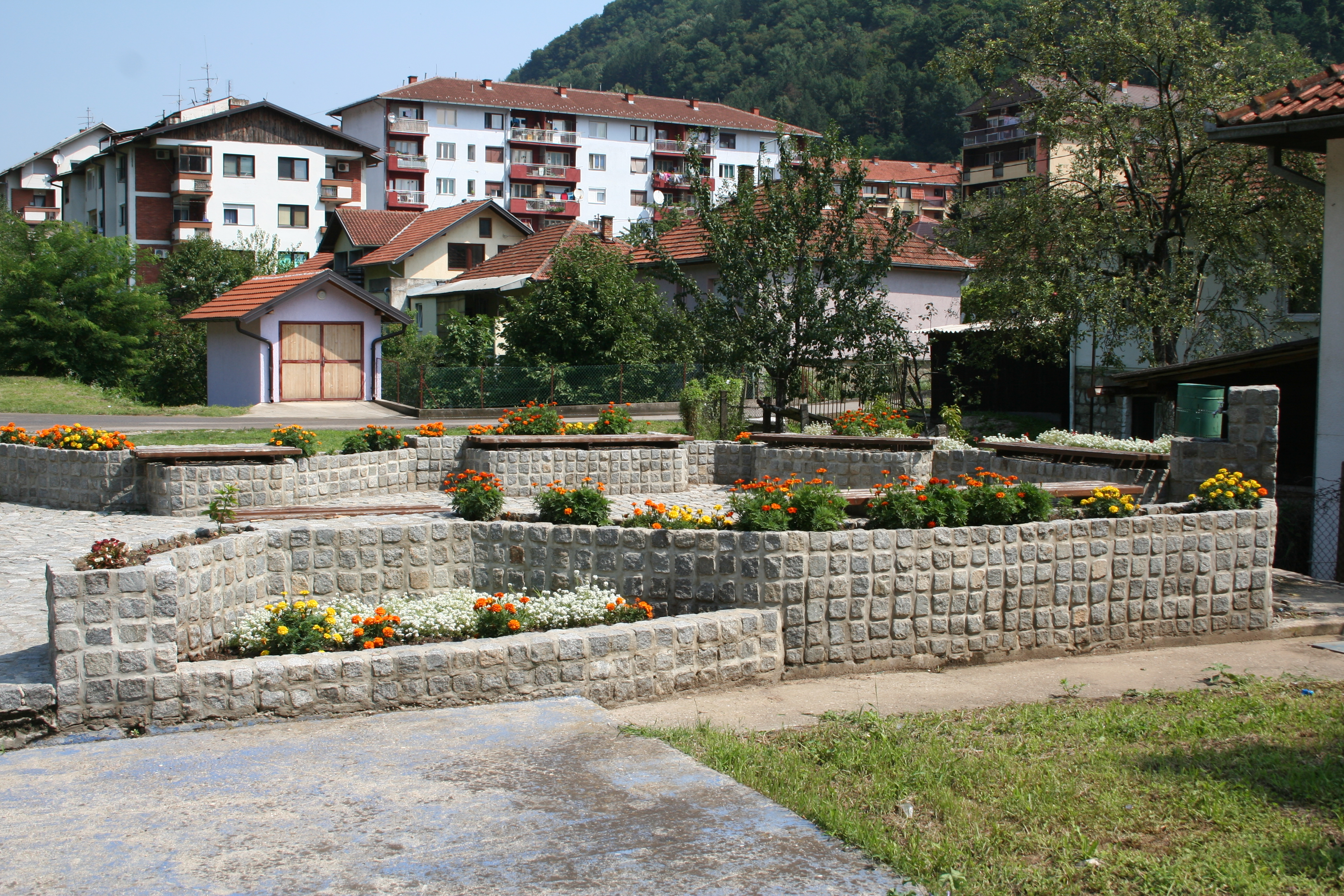
Mali Zvornik town center

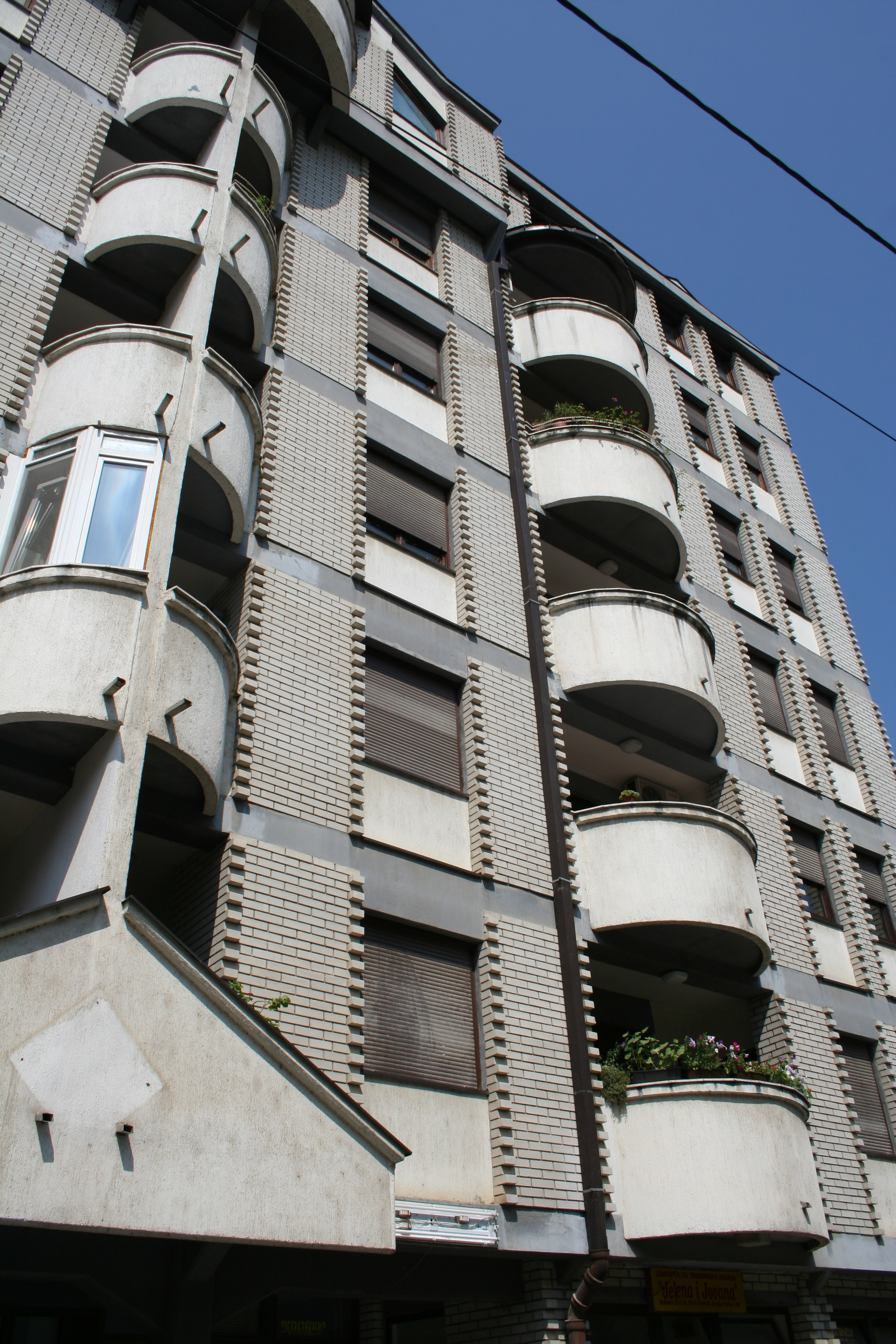
Building in Mali Zvornik

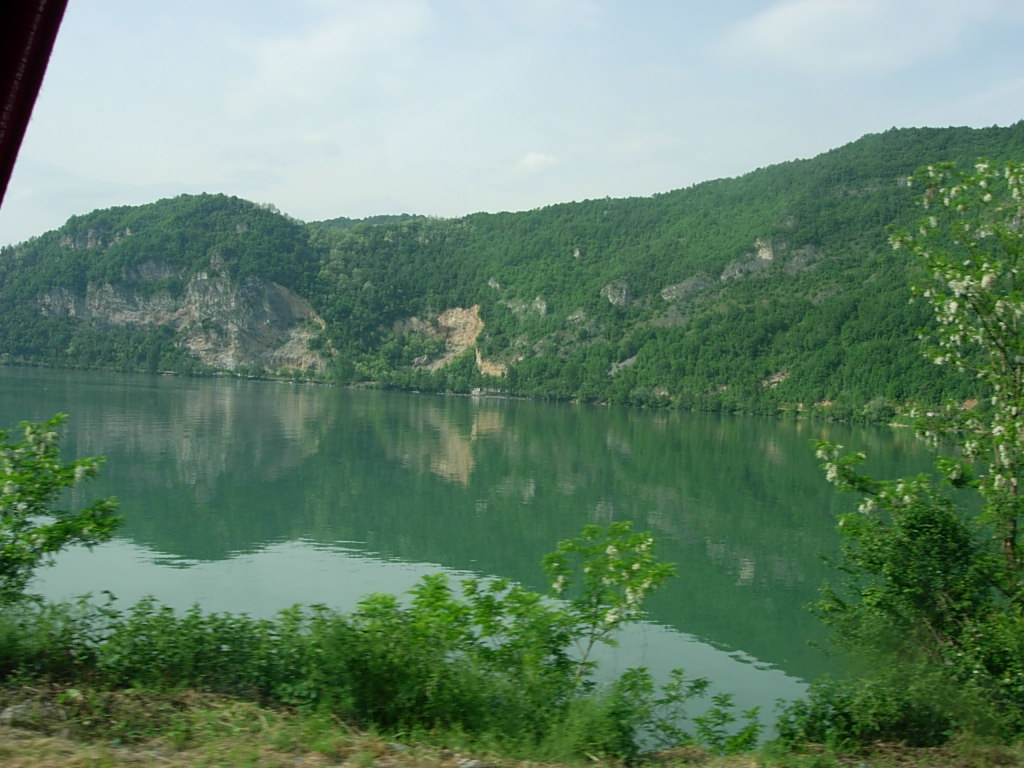
Drina river in Mali Zvornik

== Notable people ==
- Časlav Klonimirović, Prince of the Serbs from 927. until his death in 960.
- Stefan Dragutin, King of Serbia from 1276. to 1282.
- Avdo Karabegović, (1878–1908) Serbian poet
- Dušan Proroković, politician, former member of Serbian parliament
- Milinko Pantić, football player and coach
- Miloš Vasić, rower, member of Serbian Olympics team on summer Olympics in London 2012 and Rio de Janeiro 2016
- Predrag Rogan, football coach
- Đorđe Despotović, football player
- Nemanja Stevanović, football player
- Edin Rustemović, football player
- Filip Erić, football player
- Slaviša Radović, football player
- Oliver Stević, basketball player
- Aleksandar Todorović, basketball player

== See also ==
- Mačva District
- Podrinje
