= Budišić, Mali Zvornik =

Coordinates: 44°20′19″N 19°08′47″E

Budišić Будишић
- Village (Selo)
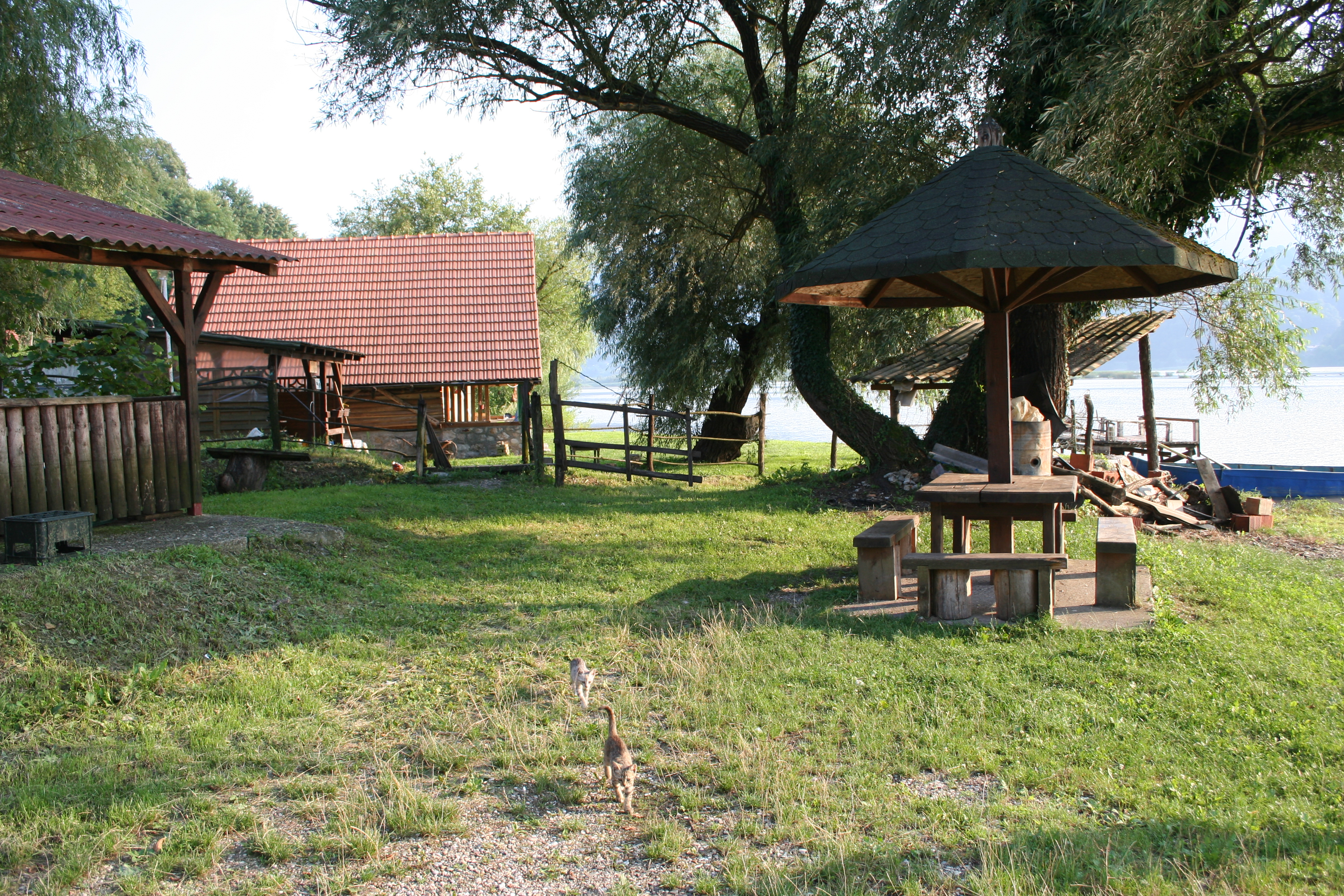
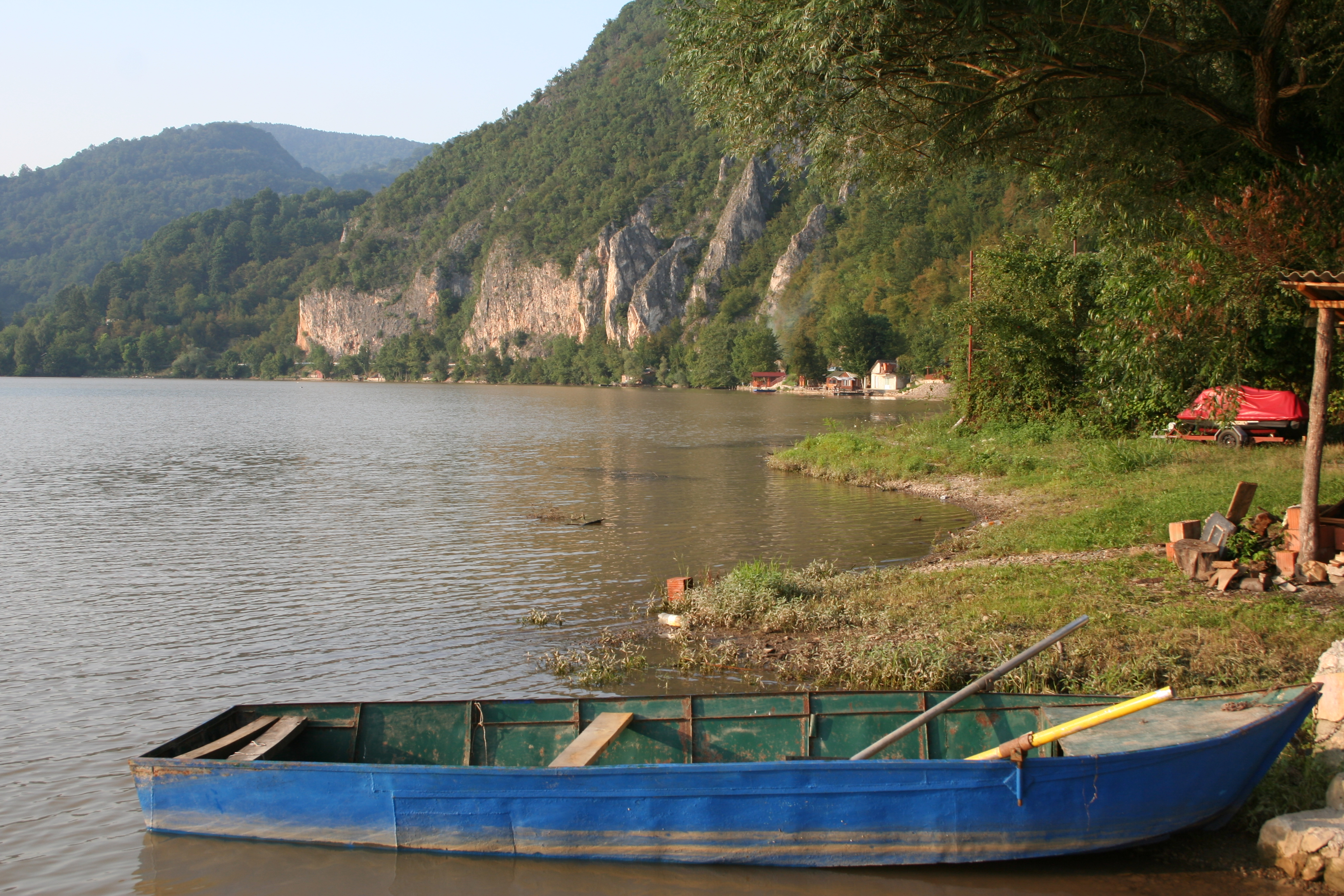
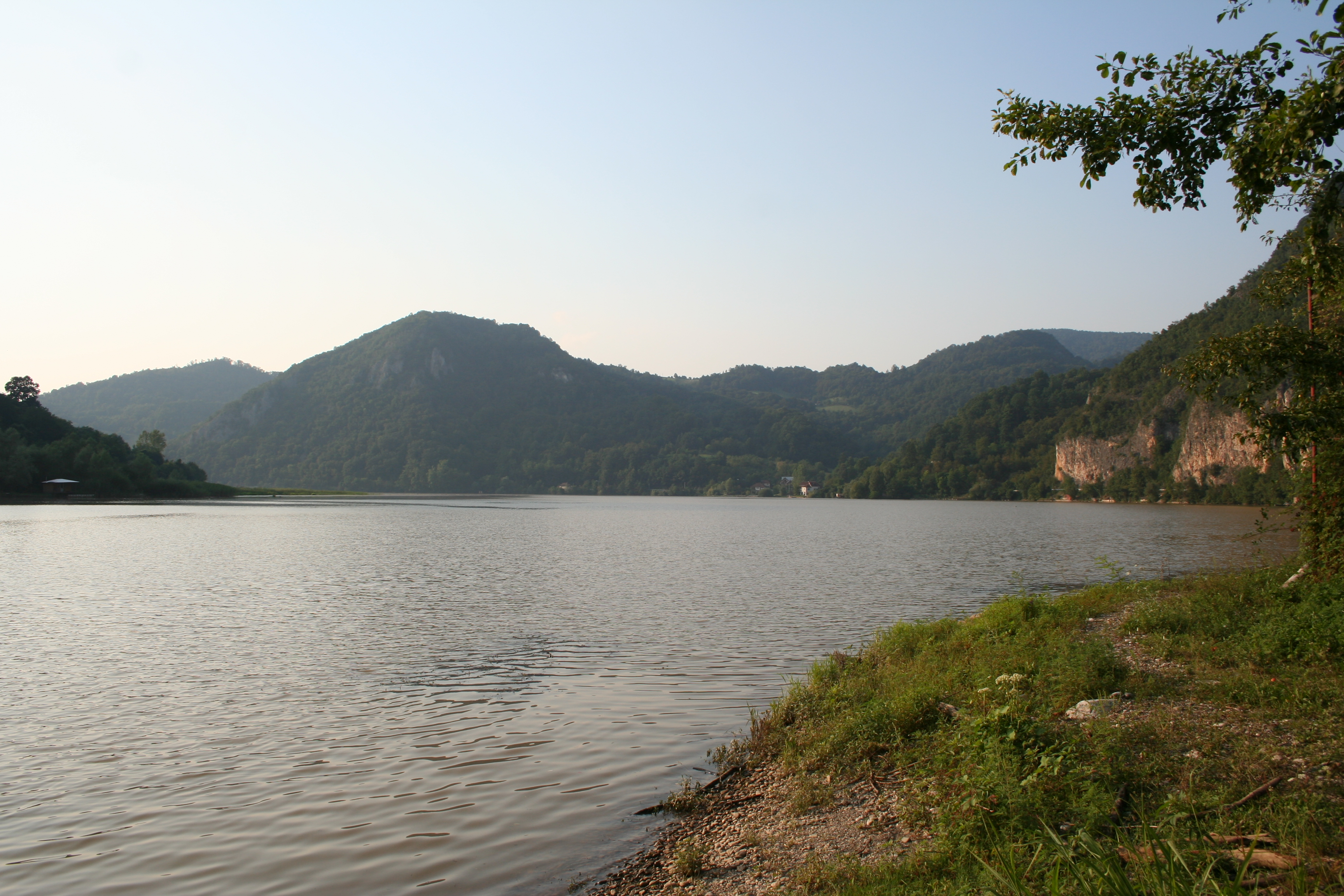
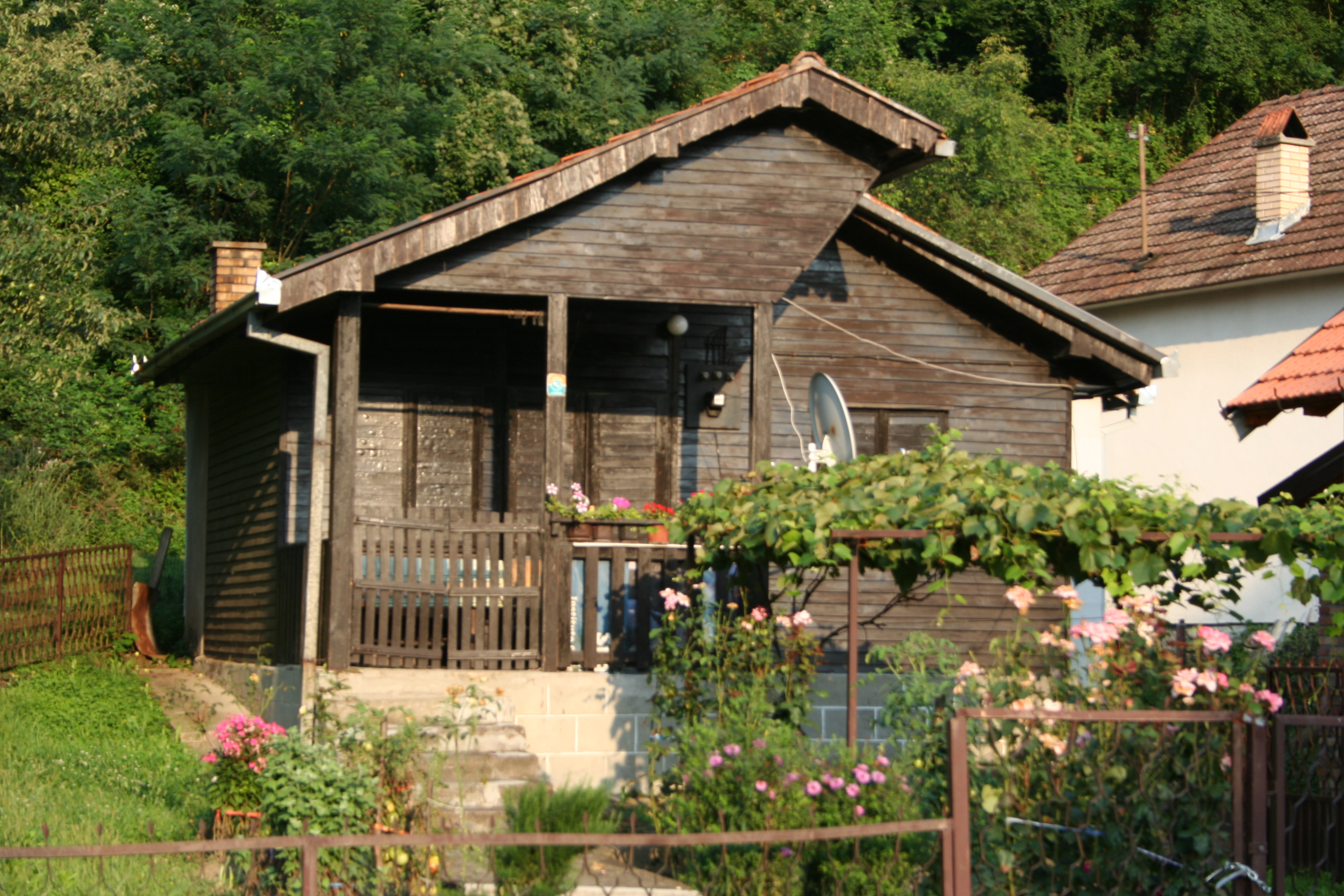
- Interactive map of Budišić
- Country: Serbia
- Municipality: Mali Zvornik
- Time zone: UTC+1 (CET)
  - Summer (DST): UTC+2 (CEST)

Budišić (Serbian Cyrillic: Будишић) is a village in Serbia. It is situated in the Mali Zvornik municipality, in the Mačva District of Central Serbia. The village has a Serb ethnic majority and its population numbers 249 people (2002 census), of which 247 are Serbs.

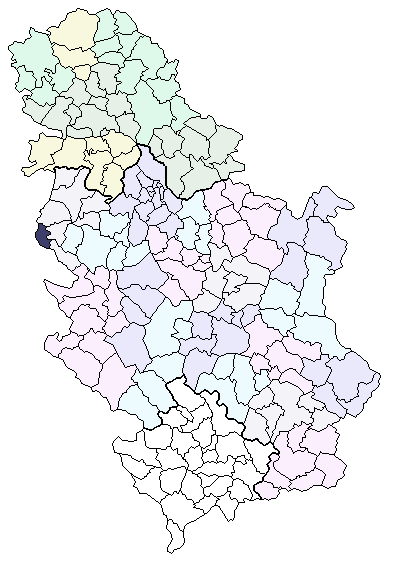
Location of the Mali Zvornik municipality in Serbia

== Historical population ==
- 1948: 306
- 1953: 481
- 1961: 346
- 1971: 308
- 1981: 328
- 1991: 278
- 2002: 249

Historical population
Year	Pop.	±%
1948	306	—
1953	481	+57.2%
1961	346	−28.1%
1971	308	−11.0%
1981	328	+6.5%
1991	278	−15.2%
2002	249	−10.4%
2011	219	−12.0%

== See also ==
- List of places in Serbia
