= Suvo =

Suvo may refer to:

- Suvo, Republic of Buryatia, Russia
- Suvo Rudište, Serbia
- Suvo Selo, Serbia
