= Krnić =

Krnić may refer to:

- Krnić, Vladimirci, a village in Serbia
- Alija Krnić (born 1998), Montenegrin football player
