= Vukošić, Vladimirci =

Vukošić
- Village (Selo)
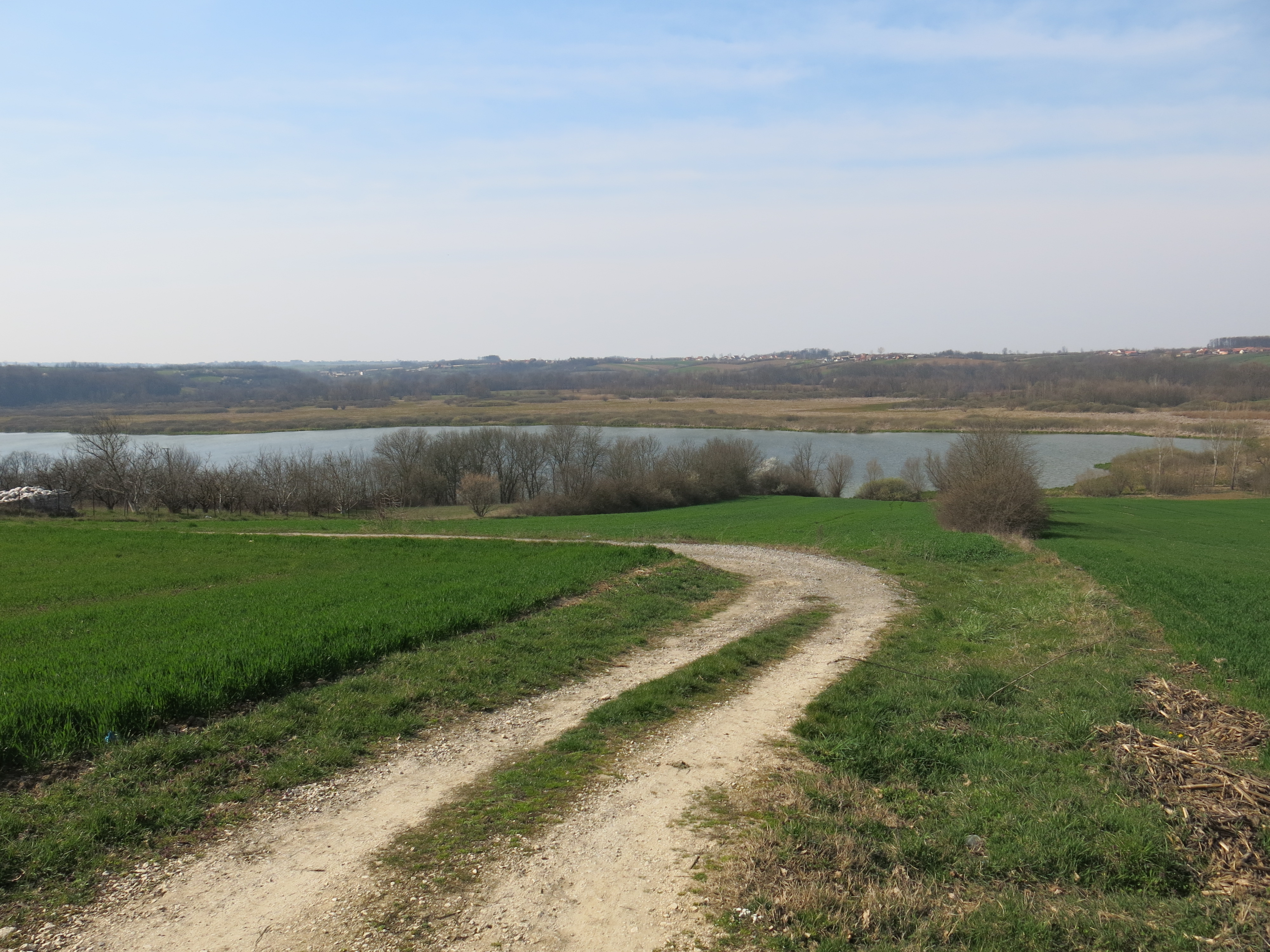
- Vukošić pond

- Location within Serbia
- Coordinates: 44°39′N 19°42′E
- Country: Serbia
- District: Mačva District
- Municipality: Vladimirci

Population (2002)
  - Total: 748
- Time zone: UTC+1 (CET)
  - Summer (DST): UTC+2 (CEST)

Vukošić (Serbian Cyrillic: Вукошић) is a village in the municipality of Vladimirci, Serbia. According to the 2002 census, the village has a population of 748 people.

== Gallery ==
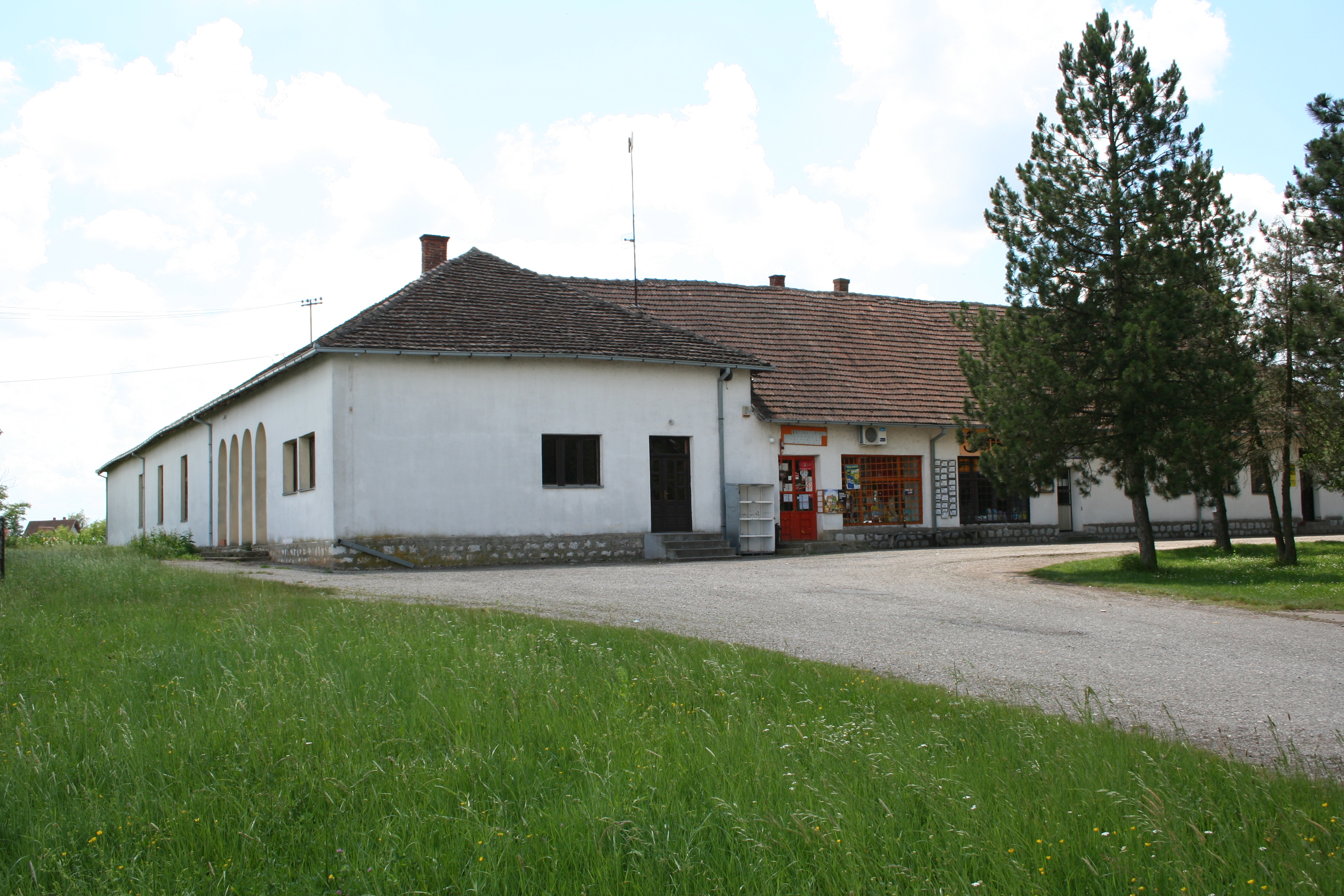

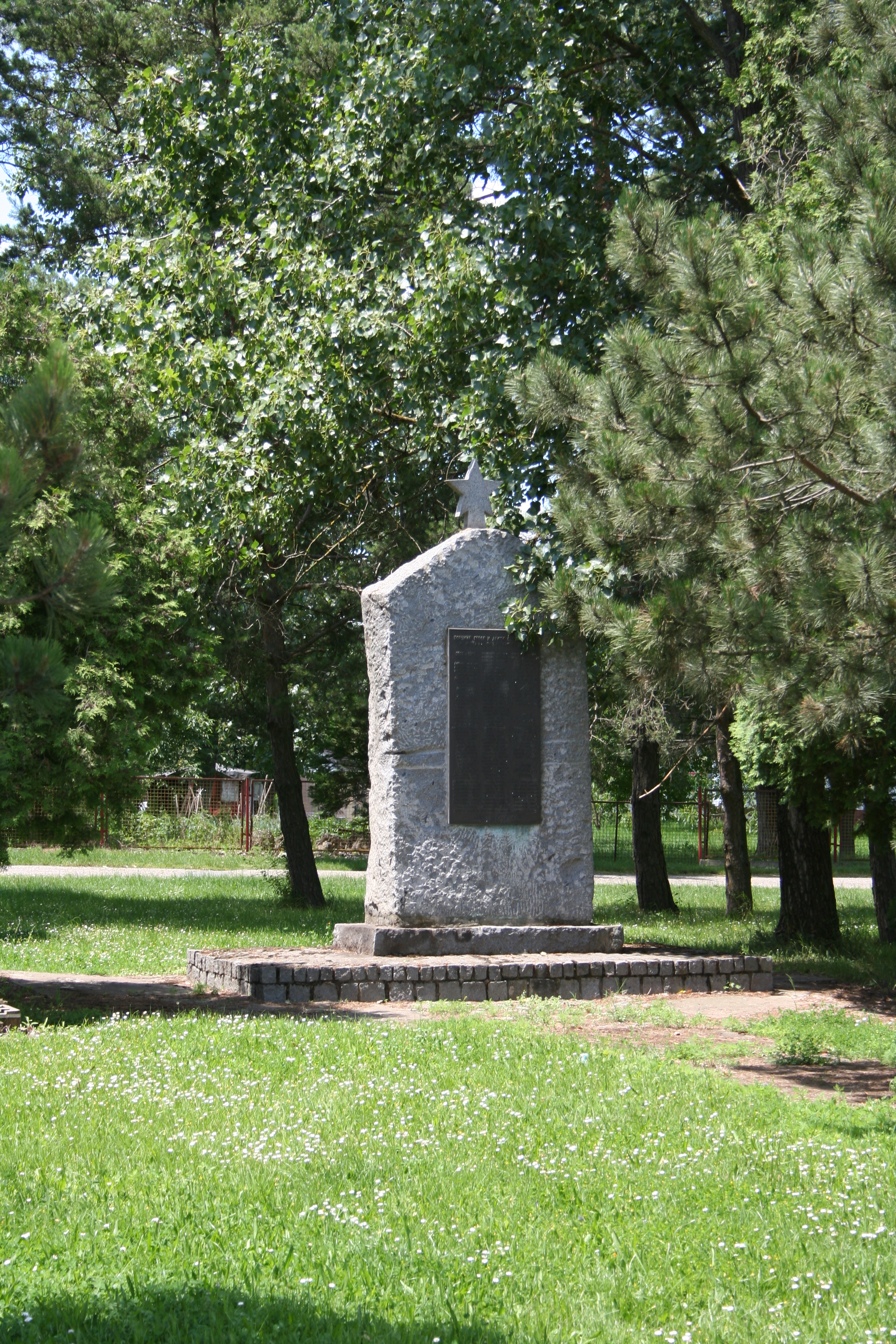

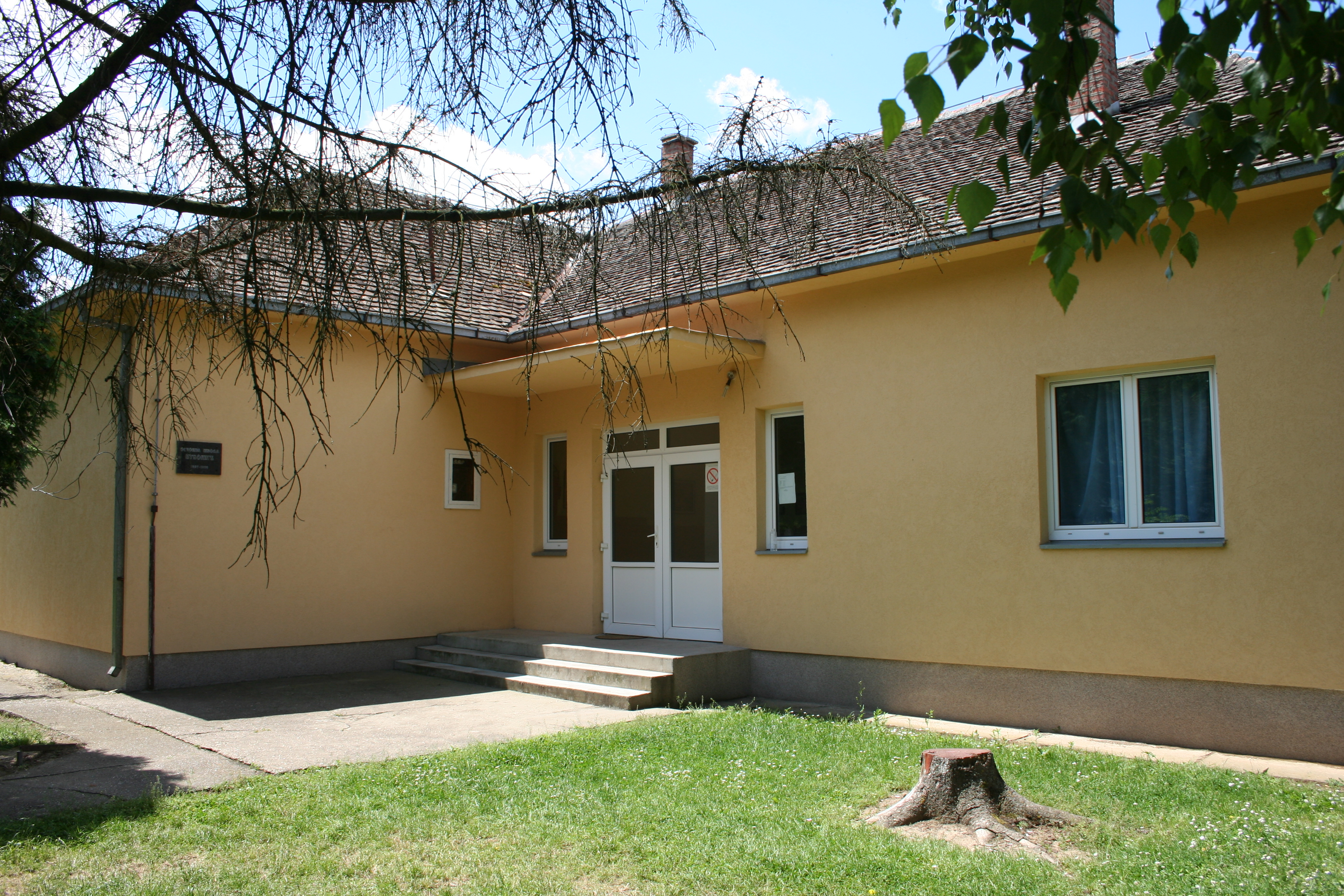
