= Belotić (Vladimirci) =

Coordinates: 44.5769°N 19.7175°E

- Village (Selo)
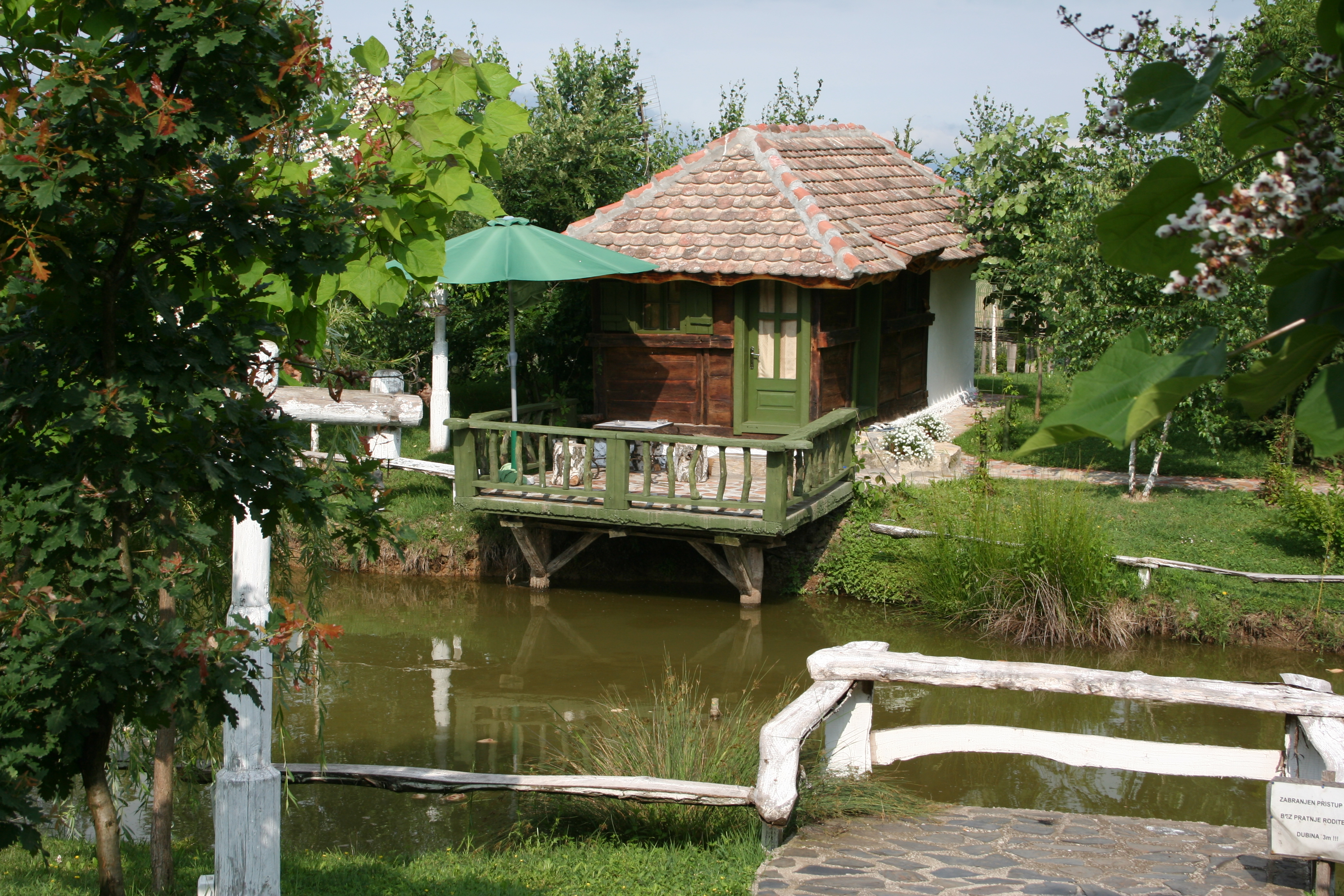
- Interactive map of Belotić
- Country: Serbia
- District: Mačva District
- Municipality: Vladimirci

Population (2002)
  - Total: 552
- Time zone: UTC+1 (CET)
  - Summer (DST): UTC+2 (CEST)

Belotić is a village in the municipality of Vladimirci, Serbia. According to the 2002 census, the village has a population of 552 people.
