= Jalovik =

- Village (Selo)
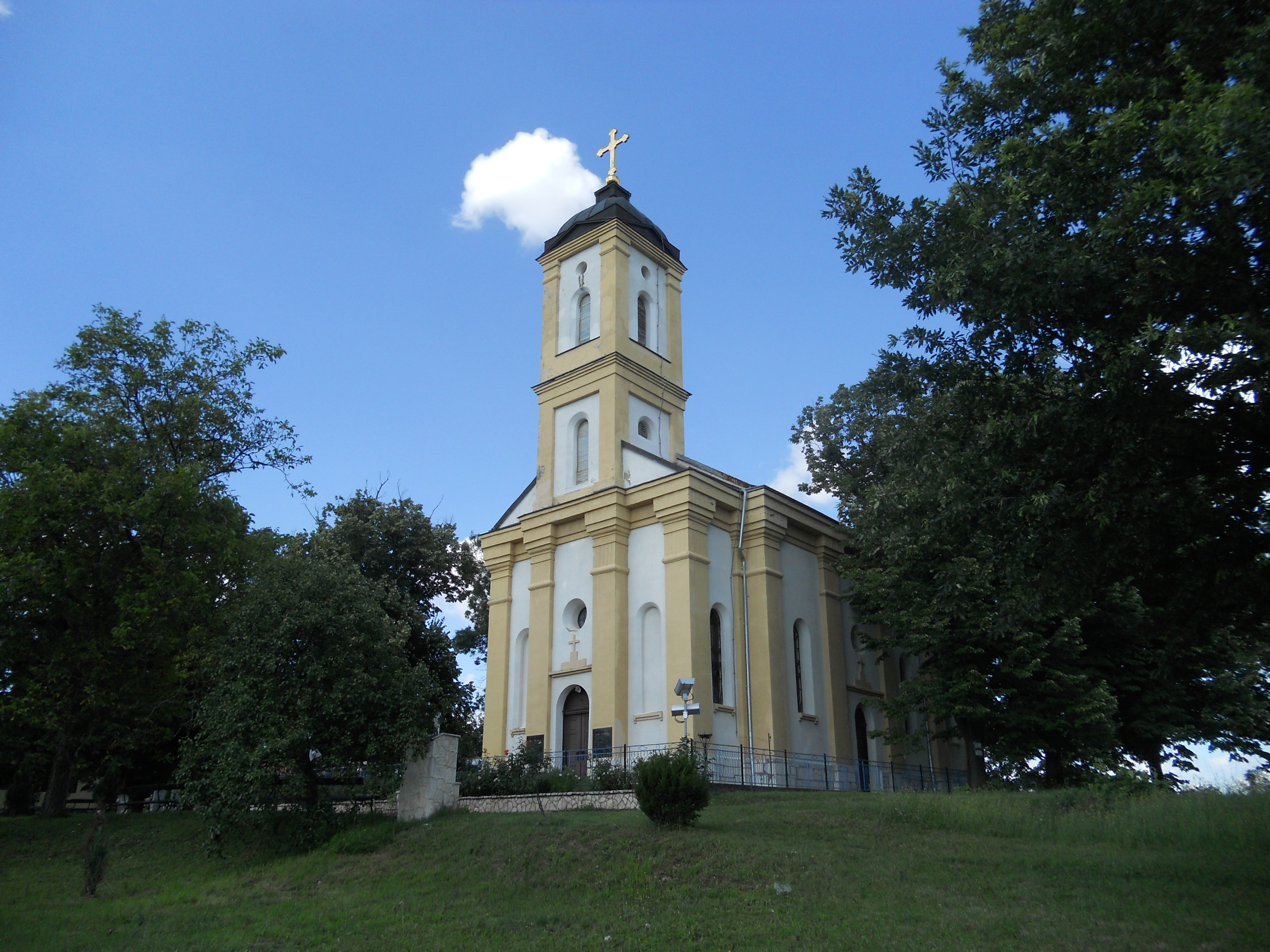

- Location within Serbia
- Coordinates: 44°37′N 19°49′E
- Country: Serbia
- District: Mačva District
- Municipality: Vladimirci

Population (2002)
  - Total: 1,950
- Time zone: UTC+1 (CET)
  - Summer (DST): UTC+2 (CEST)
- Car plates: ŠA

Jalovik is a village in the municipality of Vladimirci, Serbia. According to the 2002 census, the village has a population of 1950 people.
