= Bobovik =

- Village (Selo)
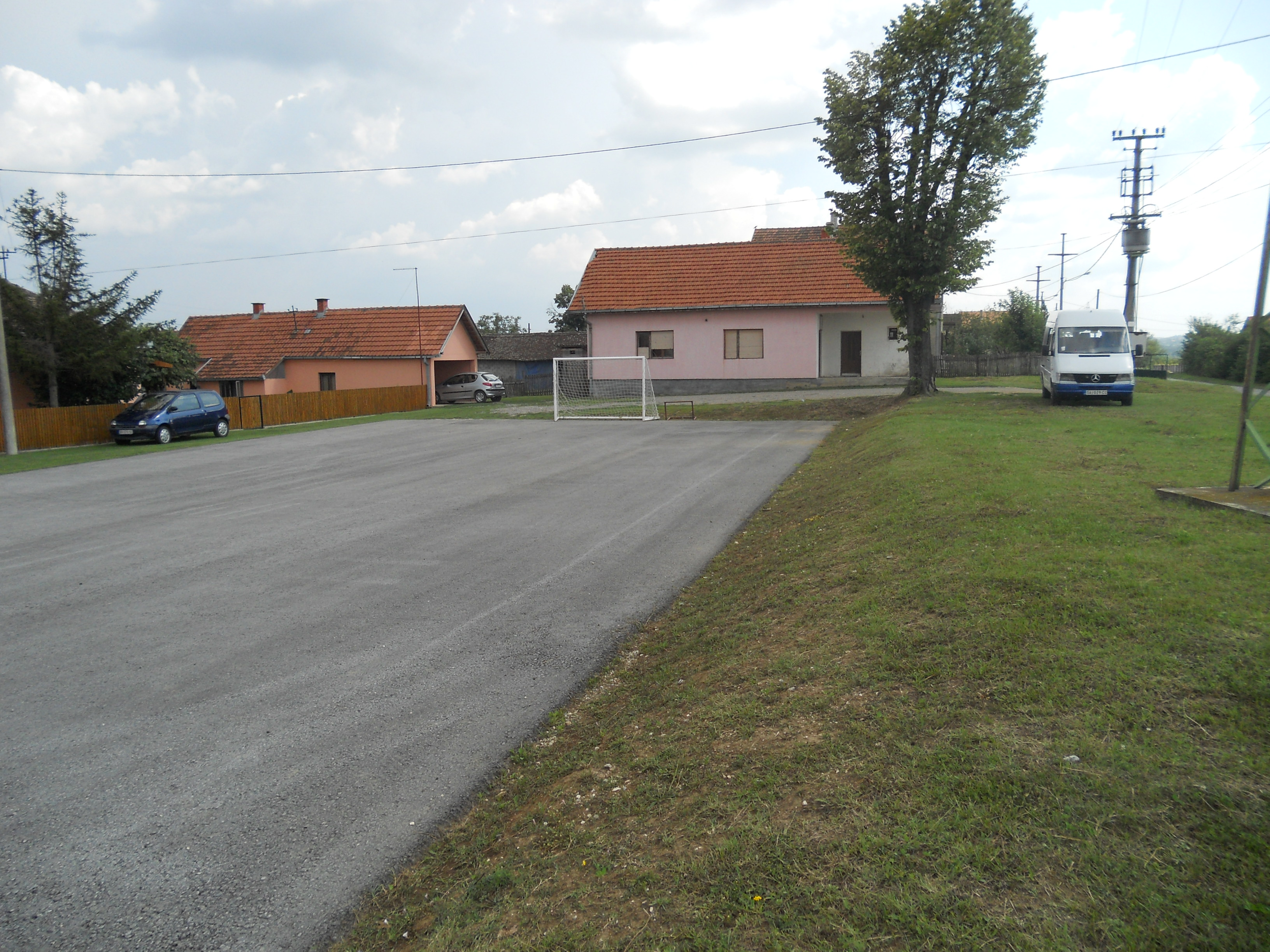

- Location within Serbia
- Coordinates: 44°37′25″N 19°47′46″E
- Country: Serbia

Population (2022)
  - Total: 232
- Time zone: UTC+1 (CET)
  - Summer (DST): UTC+2 (CEST)

Bobovik (Serbian Cyrillic: Бобовик) is a village in Serbia. It is located in the municipality of Vladimirci, in the Mačva District. The population numbered 232 people in a 2002 census.
