= Vladimirci =

Vladimirci Владимирци (Serbian)
- Village and municipality
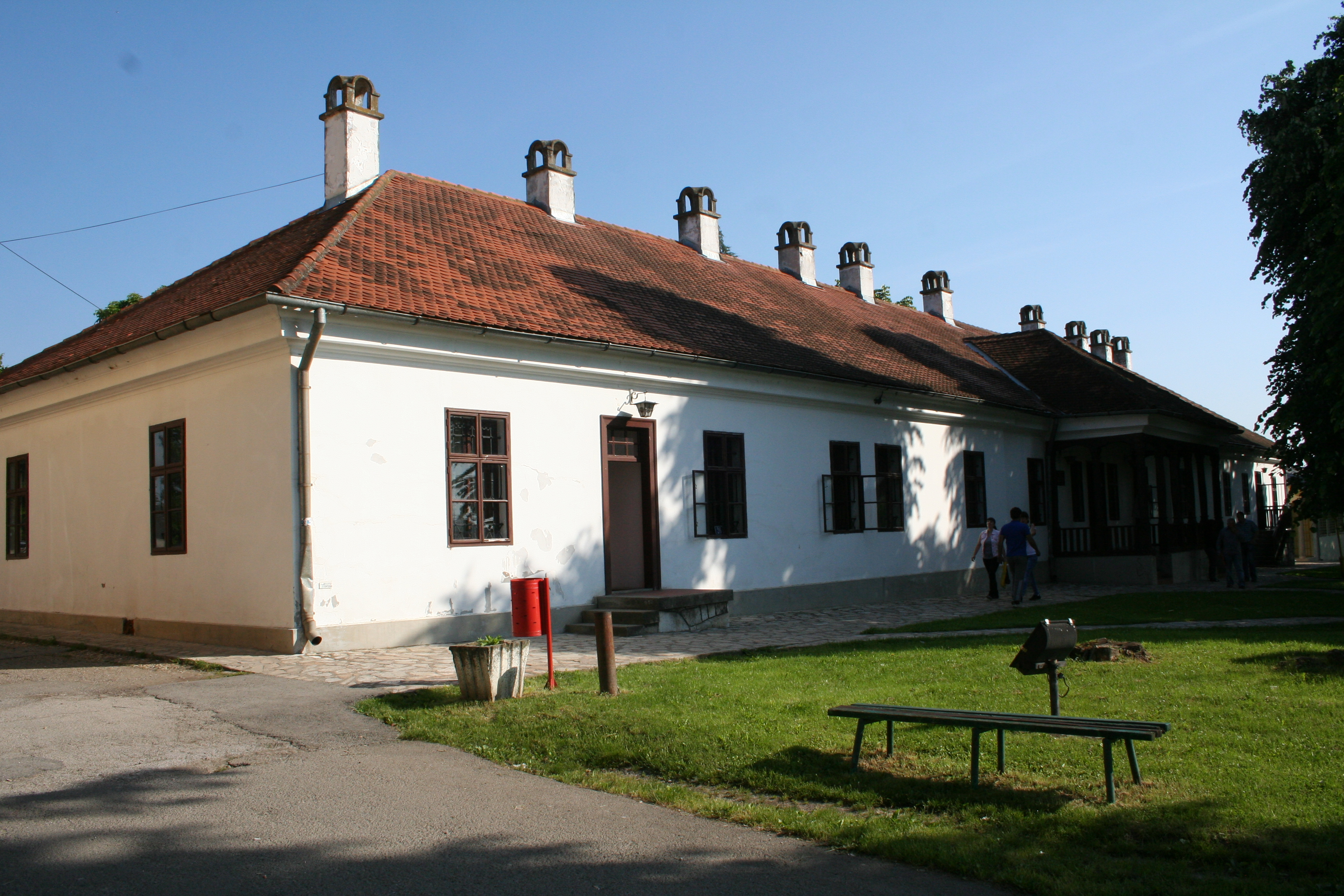
- House in front of which is monument to Milovan Glišić

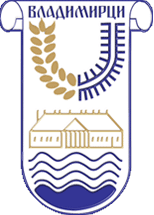
- Coat of arms

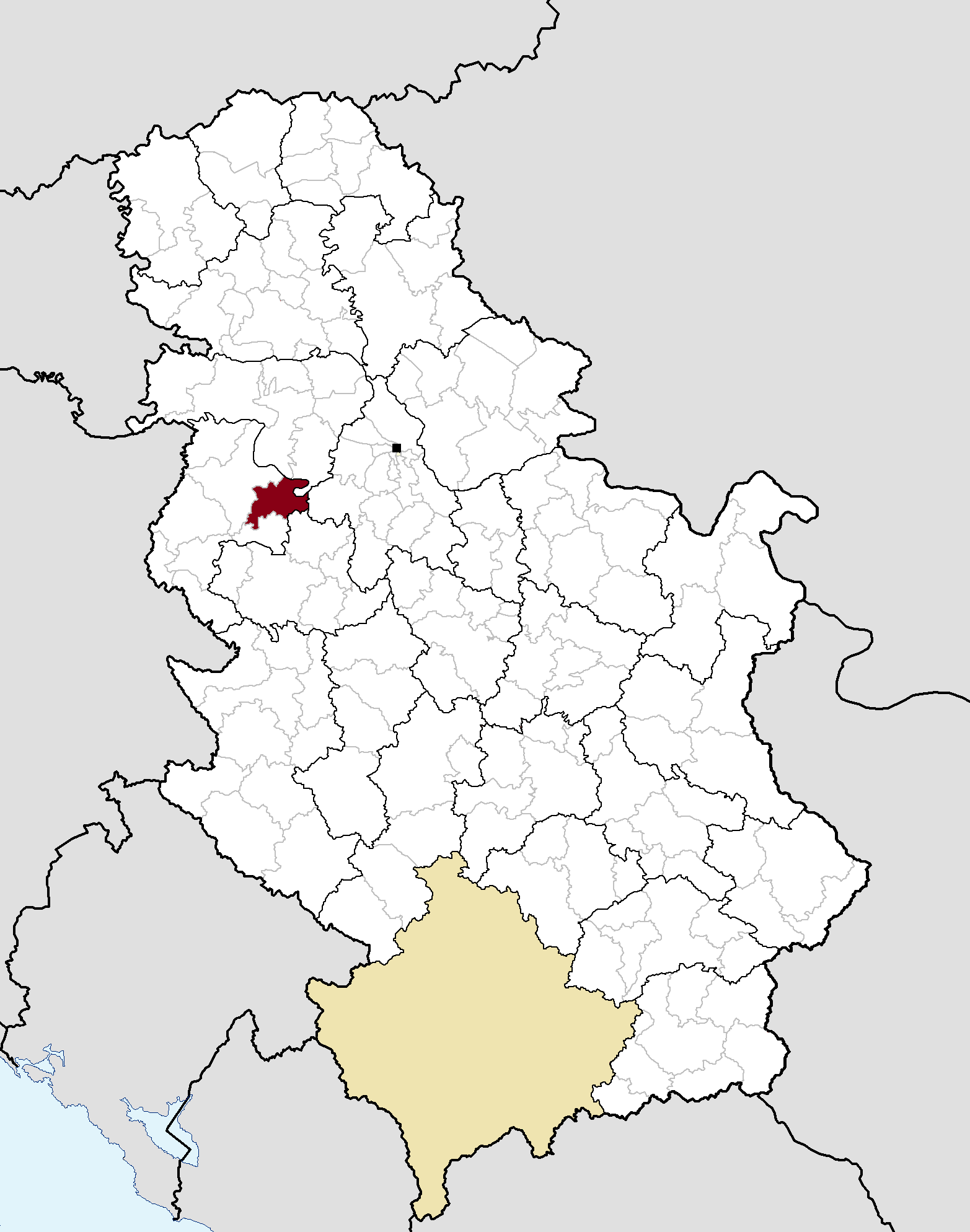
- Location of the municipality of Vladimirci within Serbia
- Coordinates: 44°37′N 19°47′E
- Country: Serbia
- Region: Šumadija and Western Serbia
- District: Mačva
- Municipality status: 11 December 1924; 101 years ago
- Settlements: 29

Government
  - Municipal mayor: Goran Zarić (SNS)

Area
  - Municipality: 338 km^{2} (131 sq mi)
  - Village: 9.46 km^{2} (3.65 sq mi)
- Elevation: 103 m (338 ft)

Population (2022 census)
  - Municipality: 14,427
  - Density: 42.7/km^{2} (111/sq mi)
  - Village: 1,535
  - Village density: 162/km^{2} (420/sq mi)
- Time zone: UTC+1 (CET)
  - Summer (DST): UTC+2 (CEST)
- Postal code: 15225
- Area code: +381(0)15
- Vehicle registration: ŠA
- Website: www.vladimirci.org.rs

Vladimirci (Serbian Cyrillic: Владимирци) is a village and municipality located in the Mačva District of western Serbia. According to the 2022 census results, the population of the village is 1,535, while population of the municipality is 14,427.

== Name ==
The name of the settlement in Serbian is plural.

== History ==
On 11 December 1924, King of Yugoslavia Alexander I declared Vladimirci a municipality.

== Settlements ==
Aside from the village of Vladimirci, the municipality includes the following settlements:

- Belotić
- Beljin
- Bobovik
- Debrc
- Dragojevac
- Jazovnik
- Jalovik
- Kaona
- Kozarica
- Krnić
- Krnule
- Kujavica
- Lojanice
- Matijevac
- Mesarci
- Mehovine
- Mrovska
- Novo Selo
- Pejinović
- Provo
- Riđake
- Skupljen
- Suvo Selo
- Trbušac
- Vlasenica
- Vukošić
- Vučevica
- Zvezd

== Demographics ==
Historical population
| Year | Pop. | ±% p.a. |
|---|---|---|
| 1948 | 28,643 | — |
| 1953 | 30,068 | +0.98% |
| 1961 | 28,281 | −0.76% |
| 1971 | 26,729 | −0.56% |
| 1981 | 25,281 | −0.56% |
| 1991 | 23,335 | −0.80% |
| 2002 | 20,373 | −1.23% |
| 2011 | 17,462 | −1.70% |
| 2022 | 14,427 | −1.72% |

According to the 2011 census results, the municipality of Vladimirci has 17,462 inhabitants.

=== Ethnic groups ===
The ethnic composition of the municipality:

| Ethnic group | Population | % |
|---|---|---|
| Serbs | 16,799 | 96.20% |
| Roma | 181 | 1.04% |
| Croats | 20 | 0.11% |
| Macedonians | 17 | 0.10% |
| Romanians | 14 | 0.08% |
| Bunjevci | 12 | 0.07% |
| Montenegrins | 11 | 0.06% |
| Slovaks | 7 | 0.04% |
| Yugoslavs | 7 | 0.04% |
| Macedonians | 7 | 0.04% |
| Others | 387 | 2.22% |
| Total | 17,462 | |

== Economy ==
The following table gives a preview of total number of employed people per their core activity (as of 2017):

| Activity | Total |
|---|---|
| Agriculture, forestry and fishing | 42 |
| Mining | 37 |
| Processing industry | 880 |
| Distribution of power, gas and water | 6 |
| Distribution of water and water waste management | 52 |
| Construction | 92 |
| Wholesale and retail, repair | 377 |
| Traffic, storage and communication | 81 |
| Hotels and restaurants | 46 |
| Media and telecommunications | 15 |
| Finance and insurance | 4 |
| Property stock and charter | 1 |
| Professional, scientific, innovative and technical activities | 63 |
| Administrative and other services | 10 |
| Administration and social assurance | 151 |
| Education | 242 |
| Healthcare and social work | 147 |
| Art, leisure and recreation | 16 |
| Other services | 32 |
| Total | 2,296 |

== Gallery ==
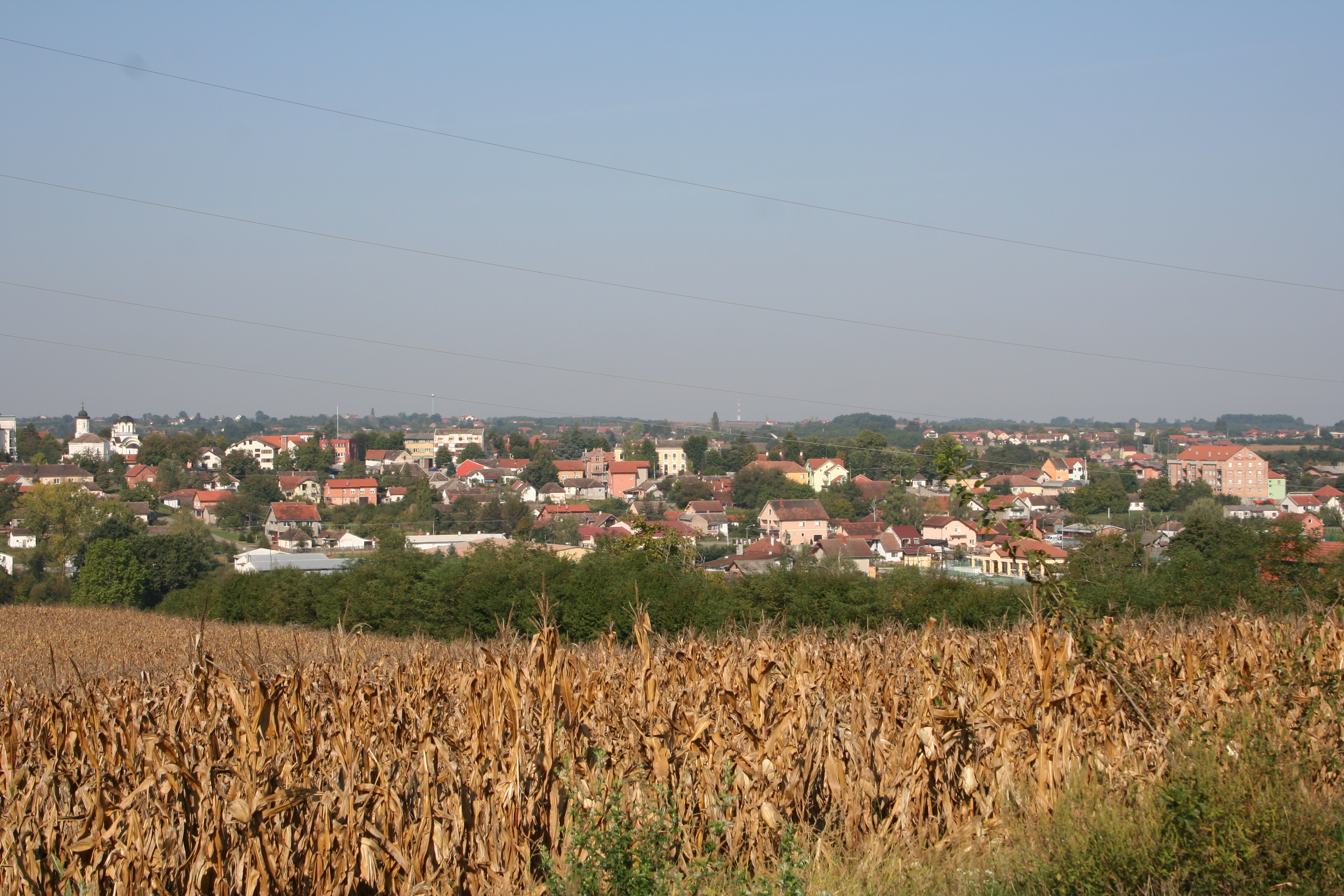
Panorama of Vladimirci

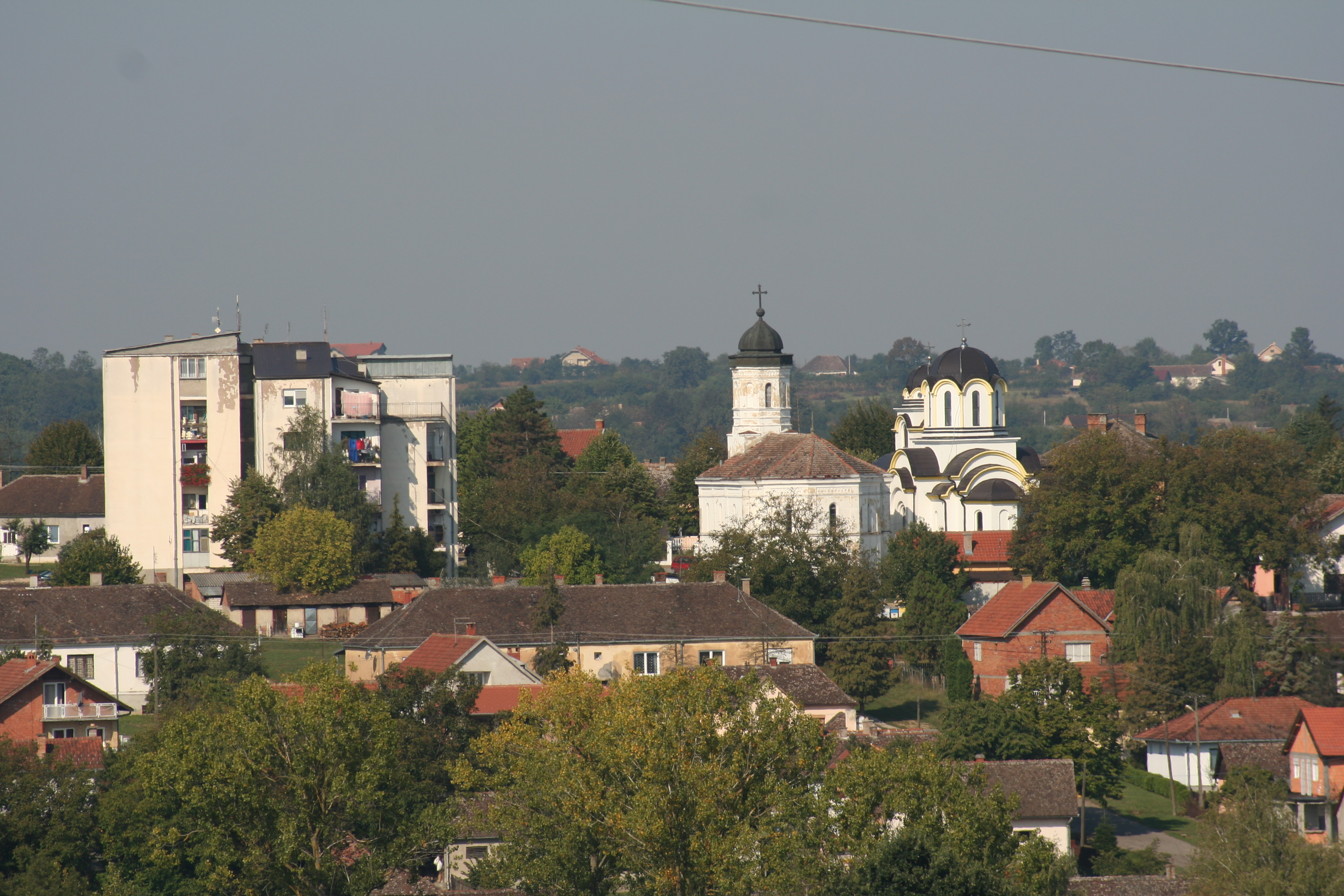
Town buildings

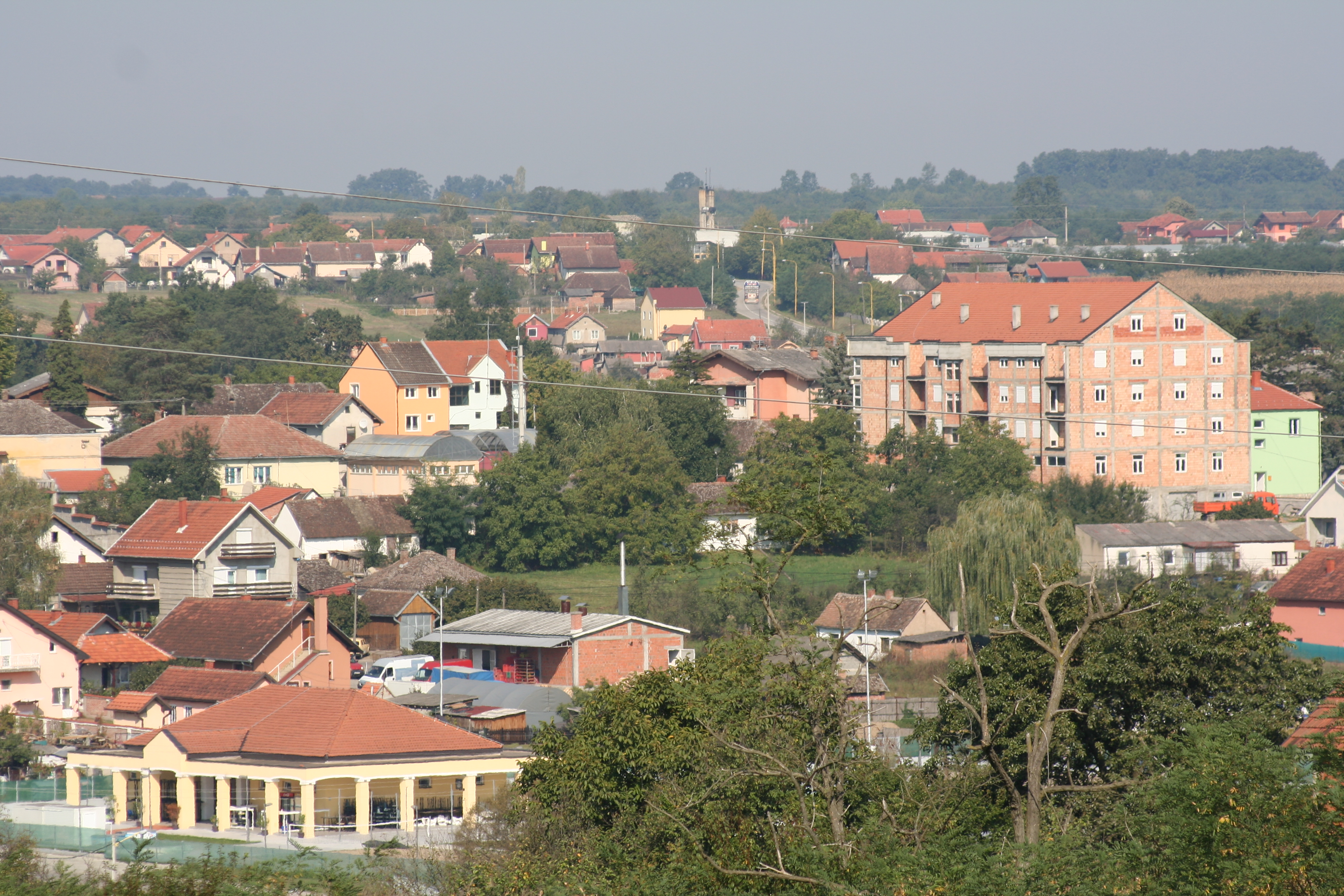
Town buildings

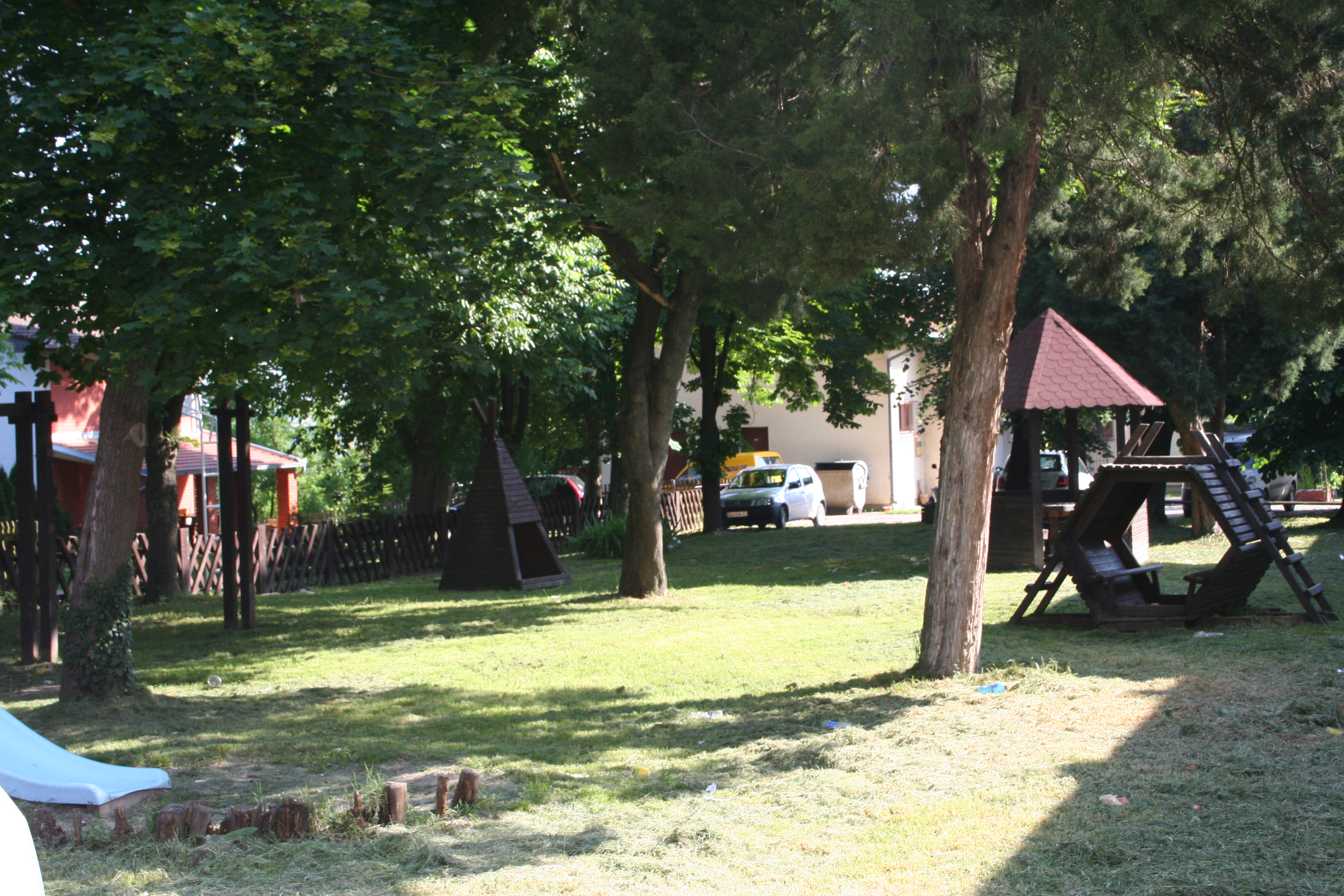
Town park

== See also ==
- List of places in Serbia
