= Provo, Vladimirci =

Provo Прово
- Village (Selo)
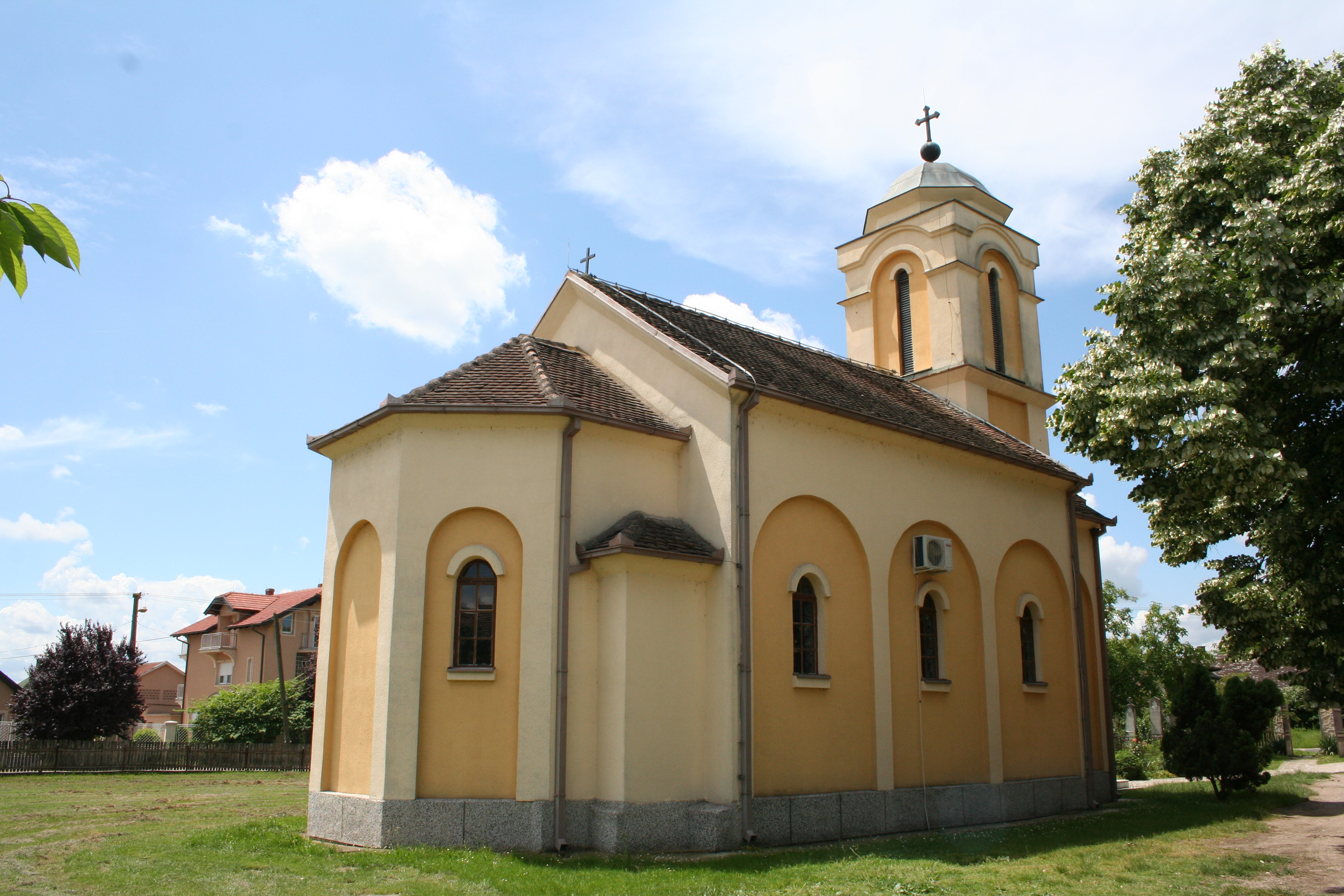
- Orthodox Church

- Location within Serbia
- Coordinates: 44°40′9″N 19°54′13″E
- Country: Serbia

Population (2022)
  - Total: 1,737
- Time zone: UTC+1 (CET)
  - Summer (DST): UTC+2 (CEST)
- Postal code: 15215
- Area code: 015

Provo (Serbian: Прово) is a Serbian village located in the Vladimirci municipality of the Mačva District, with an altitude of 86 meters. As of 2022, the population of Provo is 1,737.
