= Vučevica, Serbia =

Vučevica
- Village (Selo)
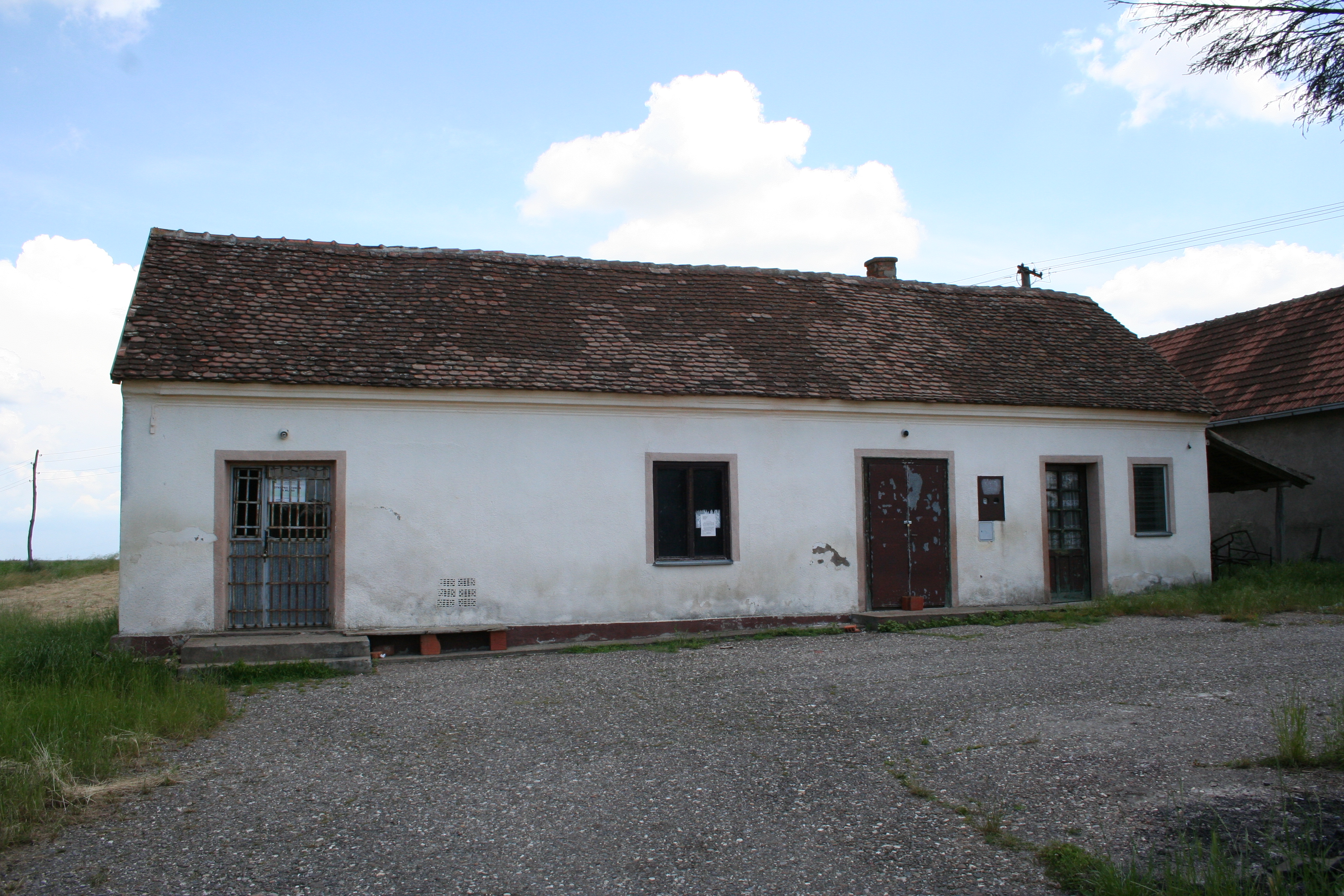

- Location within Serbia
- Coordinates: 44°40′19″N 19°46′26″E
- Country: Serbia
- District: Mačva District
- Municipality: Vladimirci

Population (2002)
  - Total: 108
- Time zone: UTC+1 (CET)
  - Summer (DST): UTC+2 (CEST)

Vučevica is a village in the municipality of Vladimirci, Serbia. According to the 2002 census, the village has a population of 108 people.
