= Suvo, Republic of Buryatia =

Suvo Суво
- Selo
- Location within Republic of Buryatia Location within Russia
- Coordinates: 53°39′N 110°00′E
- Country: Russia
- Region: Republic of Buryatia
- District: Barguzinsky District
- Time zone: UTC+8:00

Suvo (Russian: Суво) is a rural locality (a selo) in Barguzinsky District, Republic of Buryatia, Russia. The population was 382 as of 2010. There are seven streets.

== Geography ==
Suvo is located 45 km east of Barguzin (the district's administrative centre) by road. Bodon is the nearest rural locality.
