= Zablaće =

Zablaće may refer to:

- Zablaće (Čačak), a village in Serbia
- Zablaće (Šabac), a village in Serbia
- Zablaće, Kosovo, a village near Istog
- Zablaće, Šibenik, a section of the city of Šibenik, Croatia
