= Zablaće (Šabac) =

Zablaće Заблаће (Serbian)
- Village (Selo)
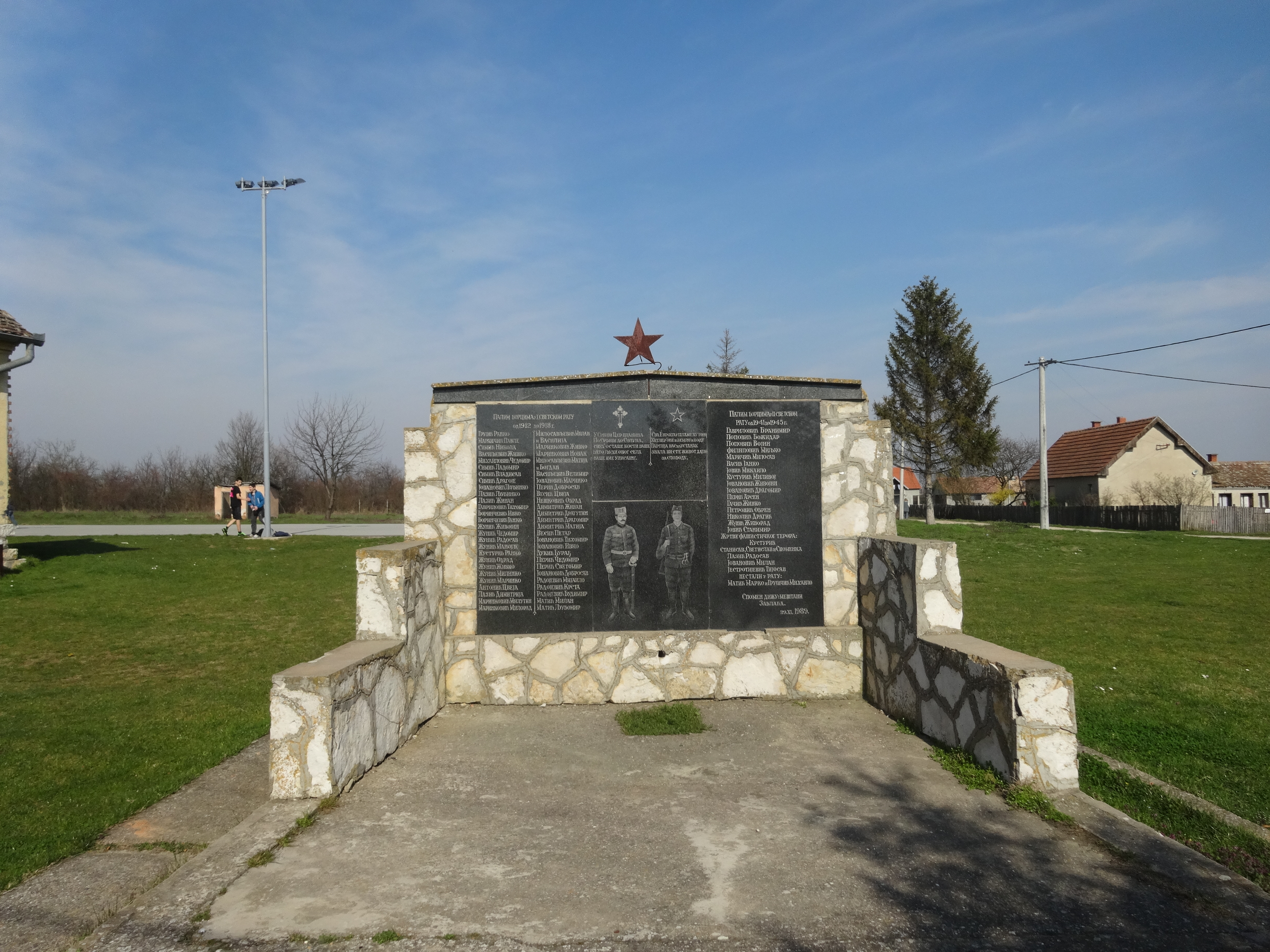

- Location within Serbia
- Coordinates: 44°38′00″N 19°41′36″E
- Country: Serbia
- District: Mačva District
- Municipality: Šabac

Population (2002)
  - Total: 674
- Time zone: UTC+1 (CET)
  - Summer (DST): UTC+2 (CEST)

Zablaće (Serbian Cyrillic: Заблаће) is a village in the municipality of Šabac, Serbia. According to the 2002 census, the village has a population of 674 people.
