= Čačak =

Čačak Чачак (Serbian)
- City
- City of Čačak
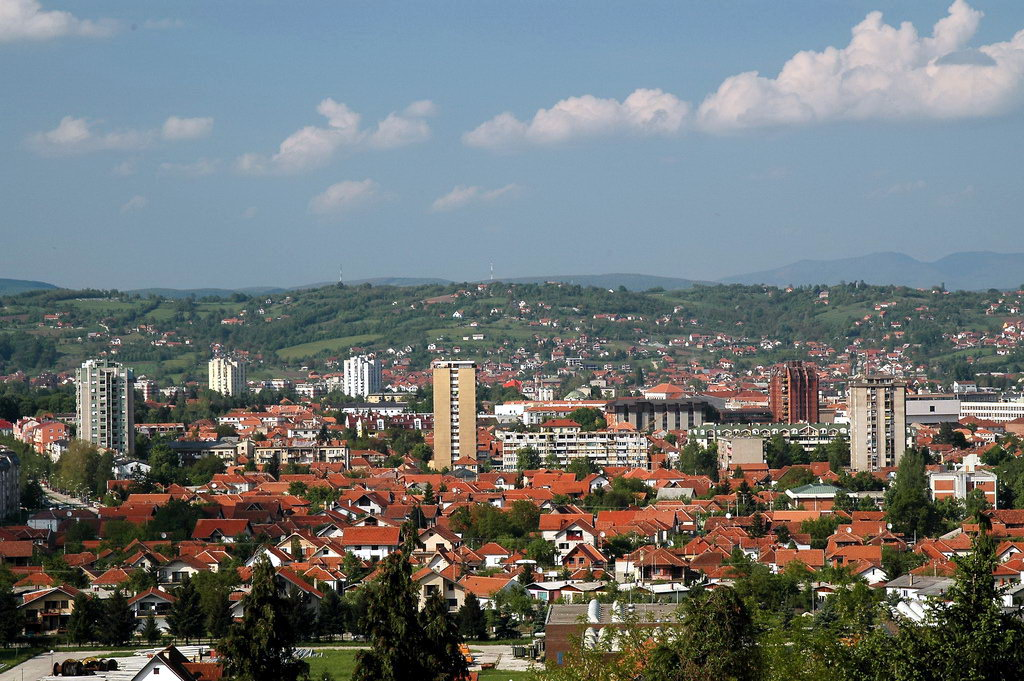
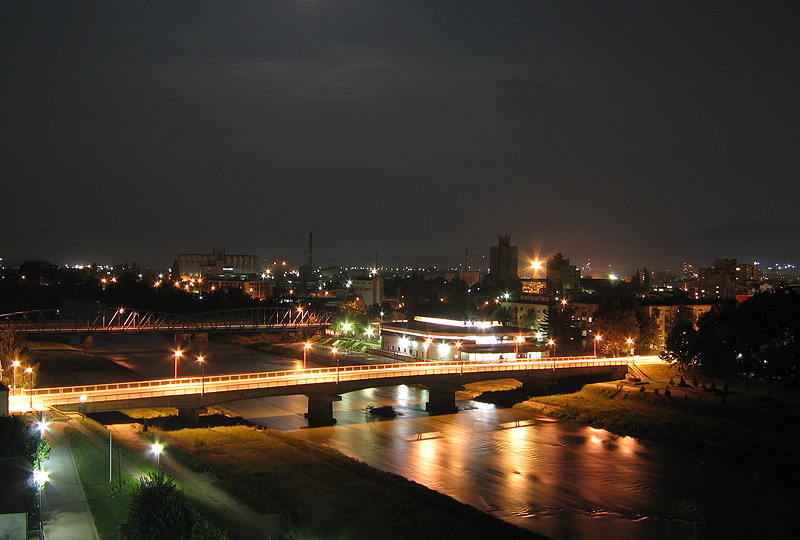
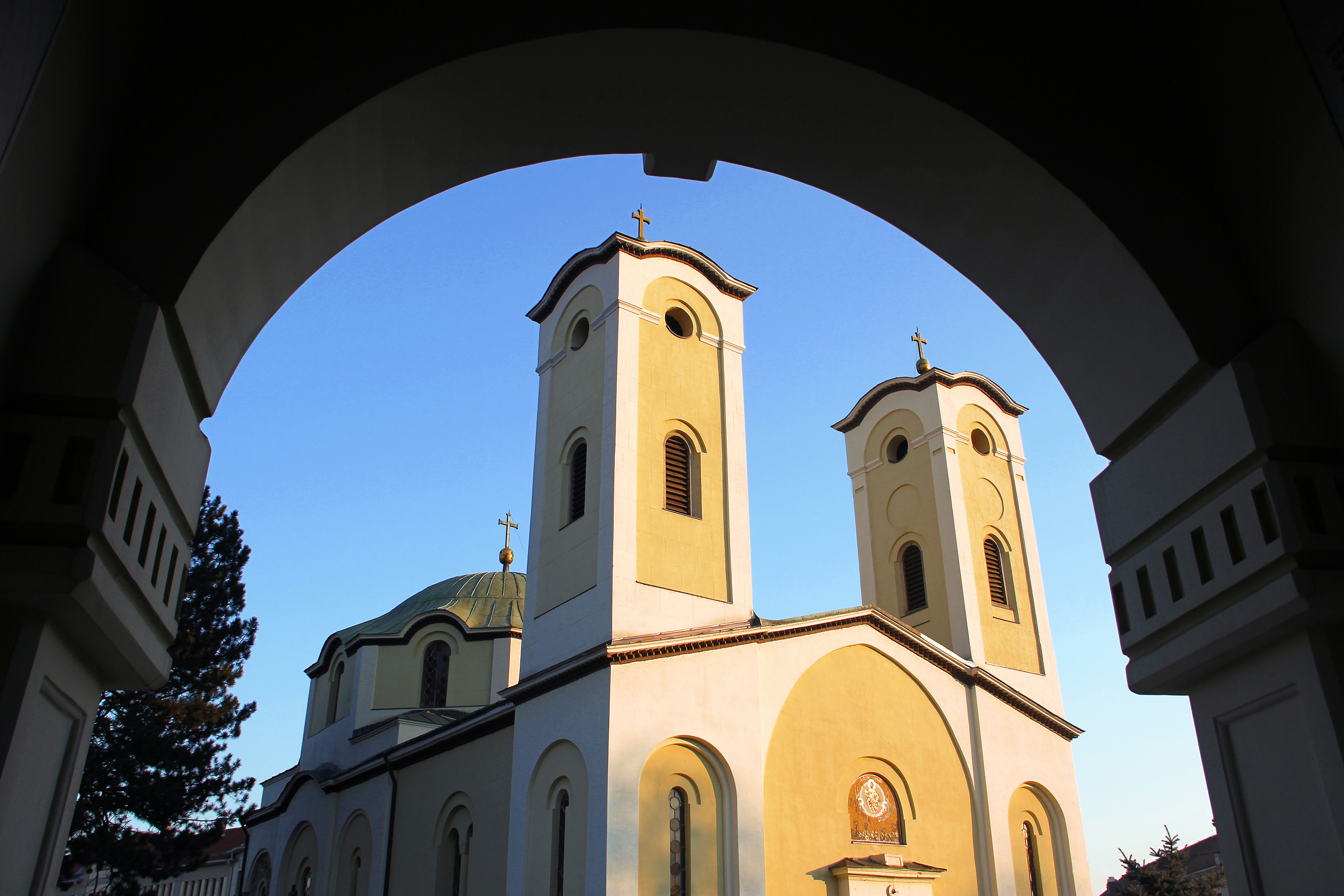
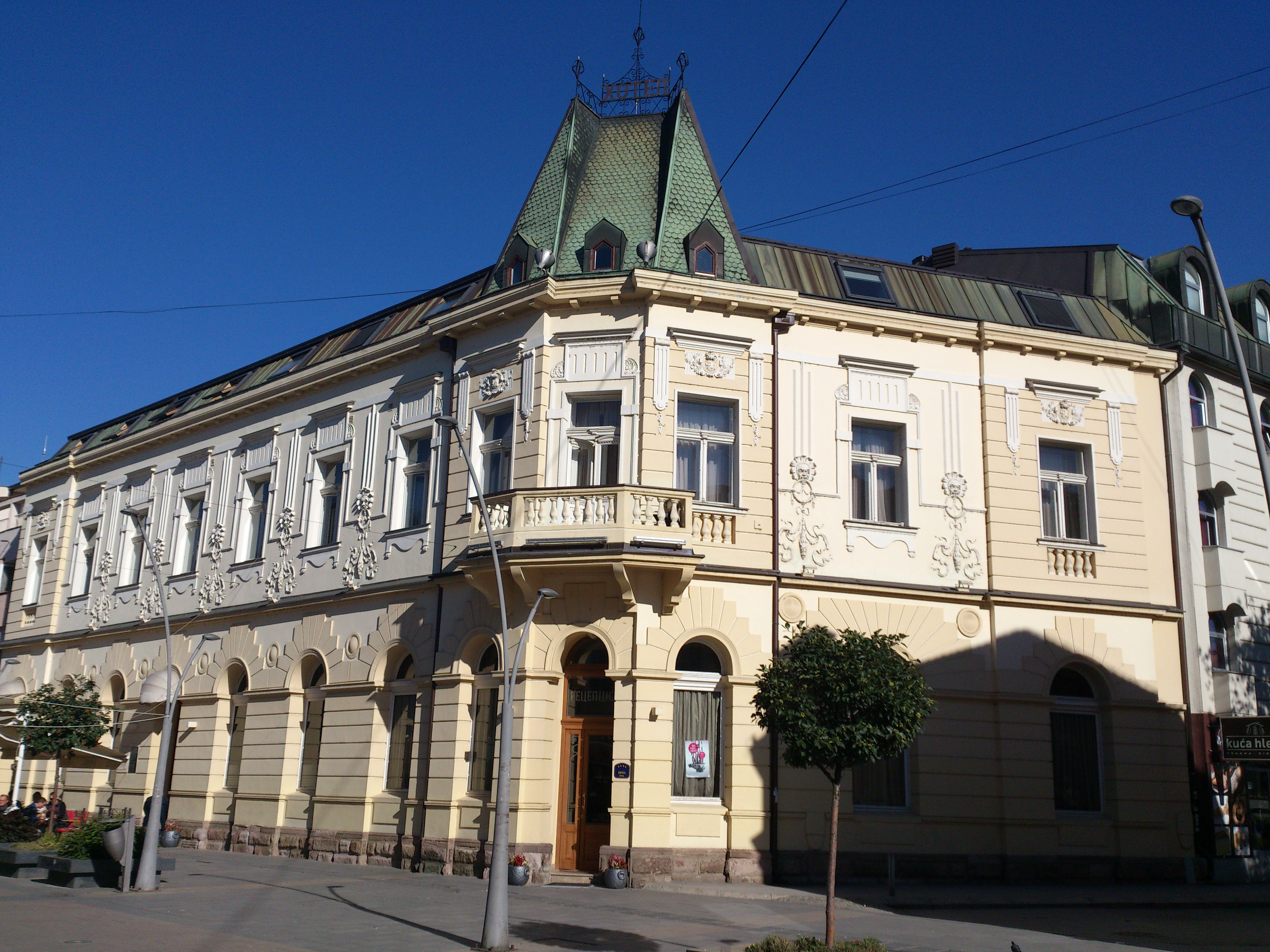
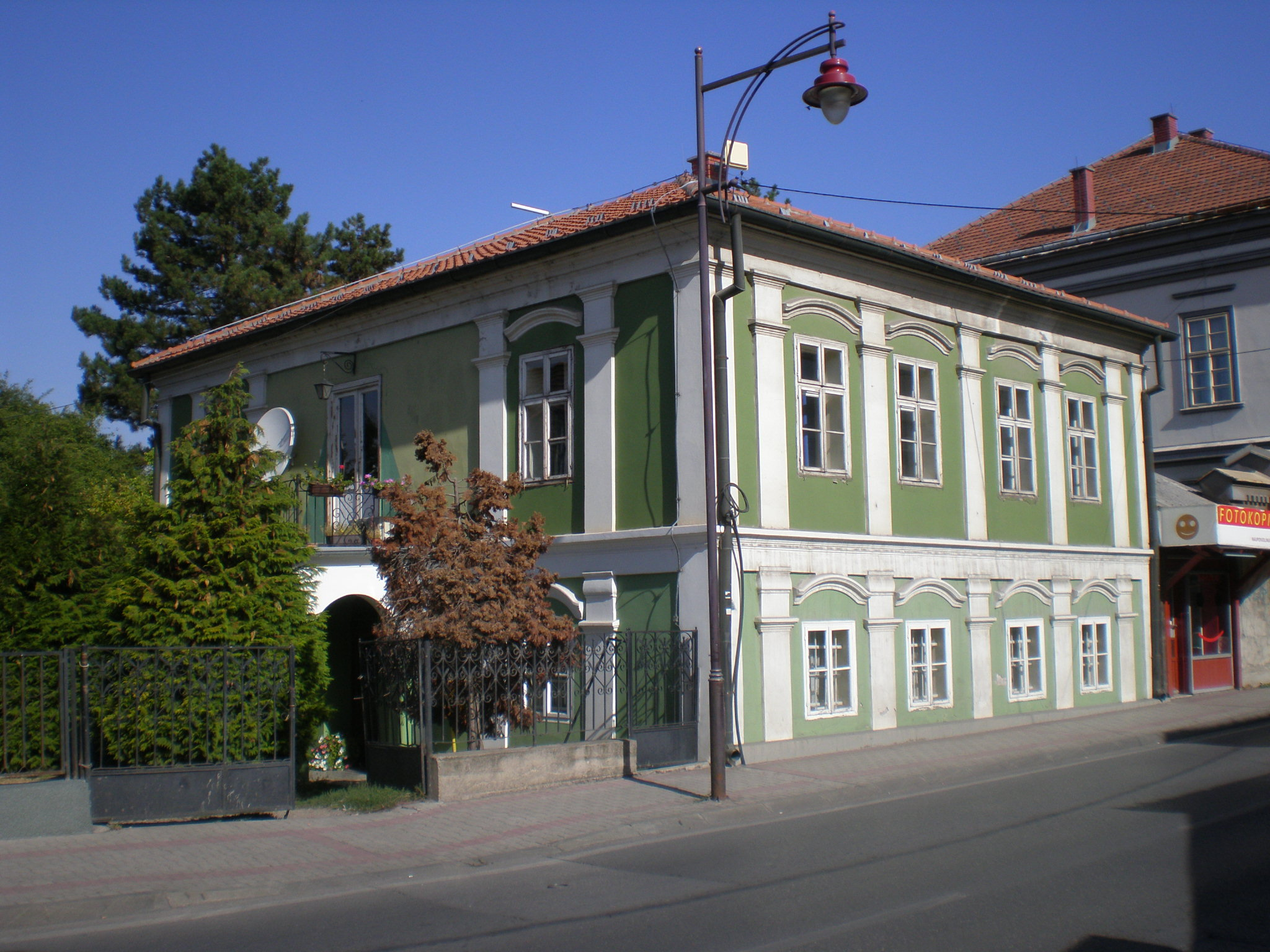
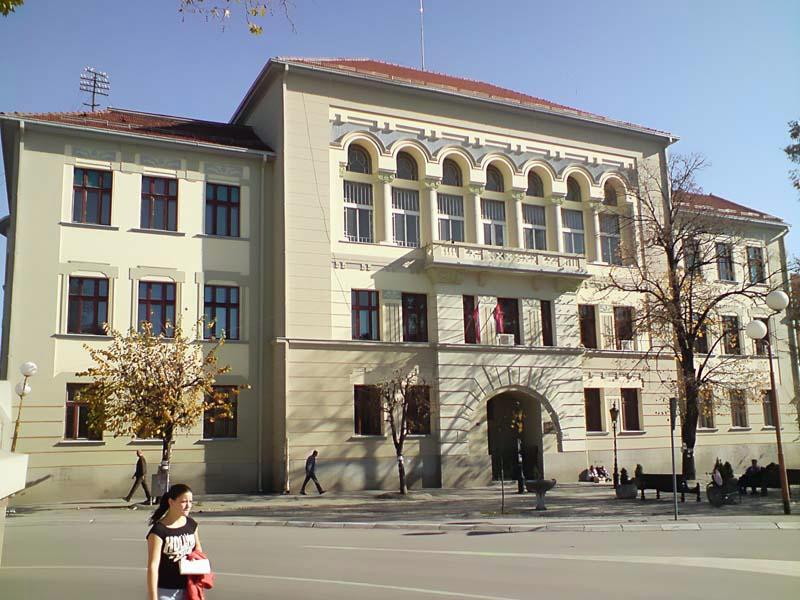
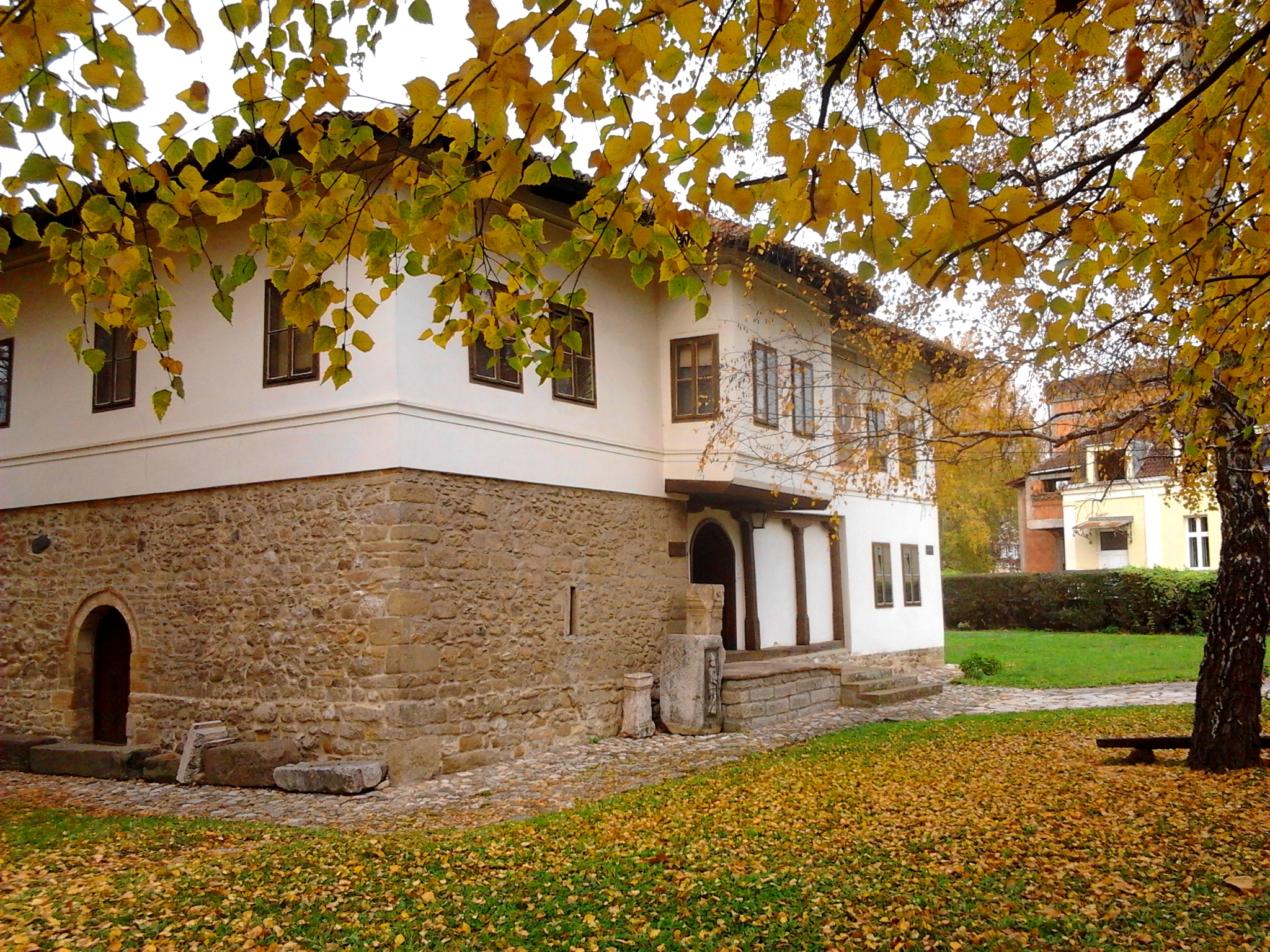
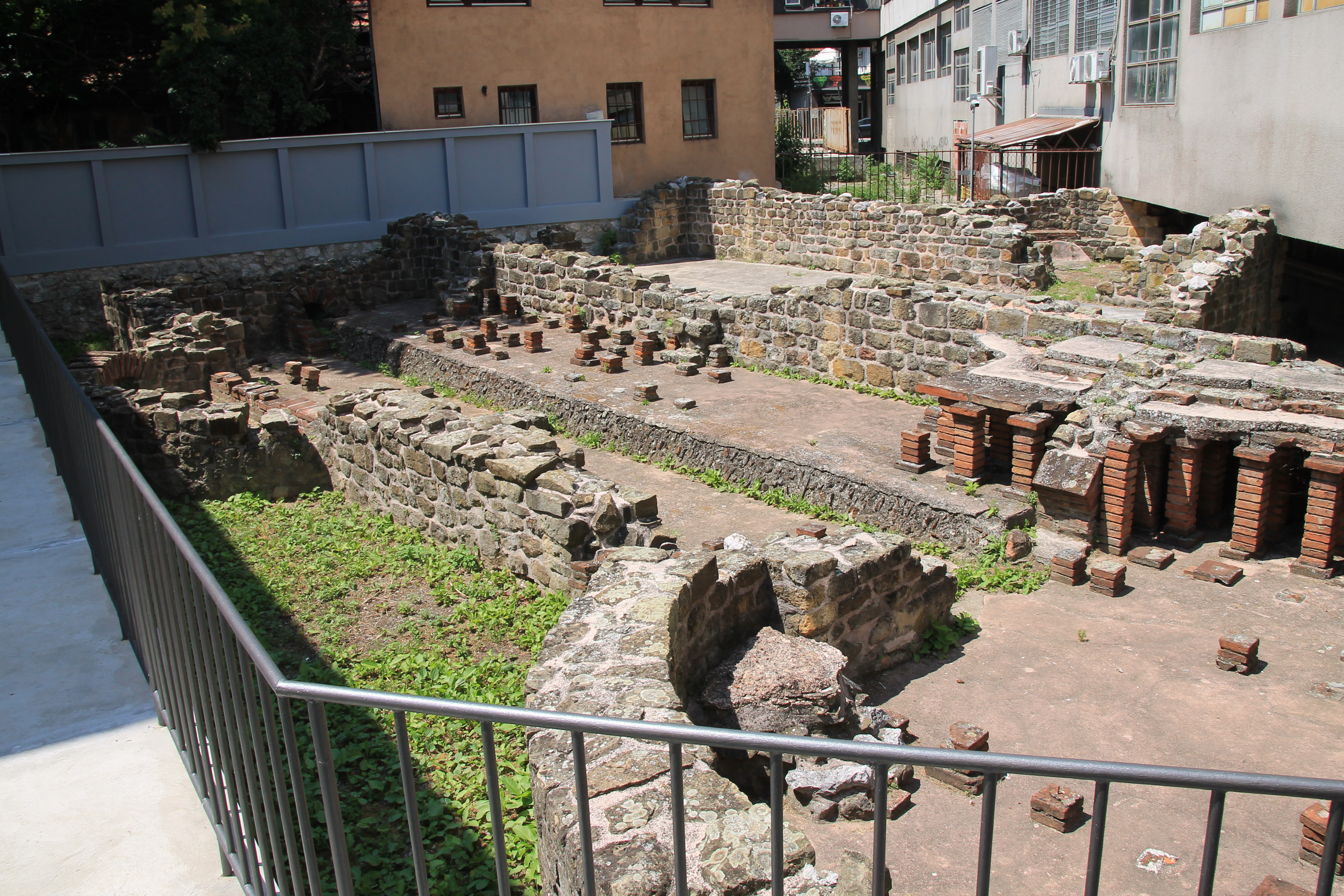
- Panorama of Čačak Bridges on West Morava Church of Ascension of Jesus Hotel "Belgrade" Čačak City Library Čačak Gymnasium National Museum Roman Baths

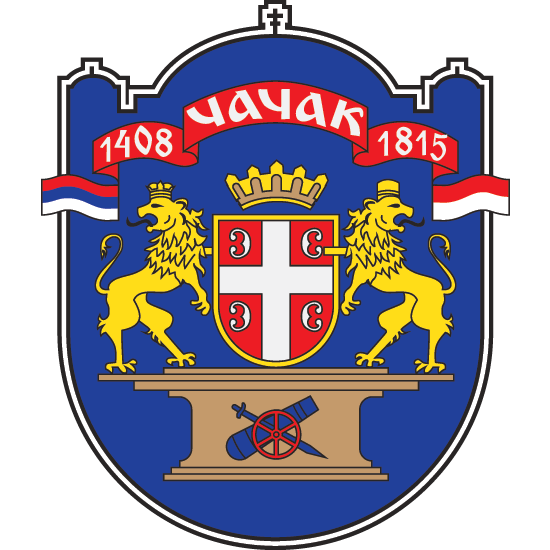
- Coat of arms
- Etymology: frozen (or dried) mud (archaic)
- Location within Serbia
- Coordinates: 43°53′N 20°21′E
- Country: Serbia
- Region: Šumadija and Western Serbia
- District: Moravica
- Settlements: 58

Government
  - Mayor: Milun Todorović (SNS)

Area
  - Rank: 43rd in Serbia
  - Urban: 36.77 km^{2} (14.20 sq mi)
  - Administrative: 636 km^{2} (246 sq mi)
- Elevation: 242 m (794 ft)
- Highest elevation (Ovčar): 985 m (3,232 ft)
- Lowest elevation: 204 m (669 ft)

Population (2022 census)
  - Rank: 12th in Serbia
  - Urban: 69,598
  - Urban density: 1,893/km^{2} (4,902/sq mi)
  - Administrative: 105,612
  - Administrative density: 166/km^{2} (430/sq mi)
- Time zone: UTC+1 (CET)
  - Summer (DST): UTC+2 (CEST)
- Postal code: 32000; 32101; 32102; 32103; 32104; 32105
- Area code: +381(0)32
- ISO 3166 code: SRB
- Car plates: ČA
- Official languages: Serbian
- Climate: Cfb
- Website: www.cacak.org.rs

Čačak (Serbian Cyrillic: Чачак, pronounced [tʃǎːtʃak]) is a city and the administrative center of the Moravica District in central Serbia. It is located in the West Morava Valley. According to the 2022 census, the city itself has a population of 69,598 while the city administrative area has 105,612 inhabitants.

The city lies about 144 km south of the Serbian capital, Belgrade. It is also located near the Ovčar-Kablar Gorge ("Serbian Mount Athos"), with over 30 monasteries built in the gorge since the 14th century.

== Geography ==
Located for the most part in western Morava Valley, the city of Čačak forms a link between the undulating hills of Šumadija in the north and the hilly and mountainous areas of the inner Dinaric Alps in the south. The central part of the city is the Čačak basin, located between the mountains of Jelica in the south, Ovčar and Kablar in the west and Vujan in the north, while in the east it is open to the Kraljevo basin. These mountains gently and undulatingly descend towards the Čačak basin, the town of Čačak and the West Morava river.

The city administrative area covers 636 square kilometres (246 sq mi) and contains:

- the Čačak valley, with an altitude between 204 and 300 m (669 and 984 ft)
- hills between 300 and 500 m (980 and 1,640 ft) high
- the mountains Jelica to the south, Vujan to the northeast, and Ovčar and Kablar to the west

=== Climate ===
Čačak has a oceanic climate (Köppen climate classification: Cfb). The average temperature of the city and its vicinity is 10.47 °C (50.85 °F) with 74.1% humidity, and it is characterized by warm summers and cold winters. Winds blow from the north and northeast and rarely from the west because of the mountains that block them. The average temperature in August is 20.6 °C (69.1 °F), while in January it is 0.5 °C (32.9 °F). There are on average 38 days with snow during the year. The average wind speed is 2.3 metres per second (5.1 mph). The usual number of foggy days is 54. The average yearly precipitation is 799 mm (31.5 in).

There are a few recorded instances of sandstorms originating in the Sahara arriving to the town.

Climate data for Čačak
Month	Jan	Feb	Mar	Apr	May	Jun	Jul	Aug	Sep	Oct	Nov	Dec	Year
Mean daily maximum °C (°F)	4.0 (39.2)	6.1 (43.0)	11.2 (52.2)	16.5 (61.7)	20.8 (69.4)	24.3 (75.7)	26.7 (80.1)	27.1 (80.8)	21.7 (71.1)	16.7 (62.1)	11.5 (52.7)	5.0 (41.0)	16.0 (60.8)
Daily mean °C (°F)	−0.5 (31.1)	1.1 (34.0)	5.7 (42.3)	10.9 (51.6)	15.4 (59.7)	19.2 (66.6)	21.4 (70.5)	21.5 (70.7)	16.5 (61.7)	11.4 (52.5)	6.3 (43.3)	0.9 (33.6)	10.8 (51.5)
Mean daily minimum °C (°F)	−4.2 (24.4)	−3.2 (26.2)	0.4 (32.7)	5.0 (41.0)	9.6 (49.3)	13.6 (56.5)	15.6 (60.1)	15.5 (59.9)	11.5 (52.7)	6.8 (44.2)	2.3 (36.1)	−2.5 (27.5)	5.9 (42.6)
Average precipitation mm (inches)	55 (2.2)	55 (2.2)	71 (2.8)	76 (3.0)	92 (3.6)	85 (3.3)	79 (3.1)	55 (2.2)	60 (2.4)	55 (2.2)	54 (2.1)	62 (2.4)	799 (31.5)
Average relative humidity (%)	82	78	72	69	72	71	66	64	71	78	80	83	74
Source: Climate-Data.org

== History ==
=== Etymology ===
The original name of the town was Gradac (meaning "little town"), which developed around the Moravski Gradac monastery, built in the late 12th century. First mention of the name Čačak was in a document issued by the Republic of Ragusa. Dated on 3 January 1409, it refers to the events from 18 December 1408, and this date is today the official Čačak Town Day.

The origin of the name is obscured today. However, several dictionaries from the 19th and even from the 20th century, including works of major linguists Vuk Stefanović Karadžić and Đuro Daničić, mention words čačak and the corresponding adjective čačkovit, meaning (lumps of) frozen or dried mud, or lumps of stone protruding from the ground. The widening along the West Morava where Čačak is located, was indeed regularly flooded until the 20th century. Daničić suggested that the origin of the word is the root skak (skakati means jumping in Serbian). The word and its variants completely disappeared from Serbian language today, but some other toponymy of the same origin were preserved, like in the name of the Čakor mountain.

In time, erroneous but widespread theory developed, claiming that the name indeed means "mud", but that it is of Turkish origin. At the time of the name's first mention this region wasn't occupied by the Ottoman Empire yet, mud is called differently in Turkish language, nor there is a Turkish word corresponding vocally to čačak.

=== Prehistoric ===
The region has several archaeological sites, dating from prehistory to the present, the oldest from the 15th century BC.

Princely tombs of an Illyrian type (Glasinac culture) were found in two mounds of Atenica with Ionian glass, glass-paste, an amber bead depicting a swan, and an Attic plaque of a wild boar, all dating to the late 6th century BC. More ornithomorphic fibulae of bronze swans were found in Mojsinje.

Prehistoric tumuli have been unearthed in Mrčajevci. The Triballi and Scordisci tribes lived in this area by the time of Roman conquest.

=== Roman era ===
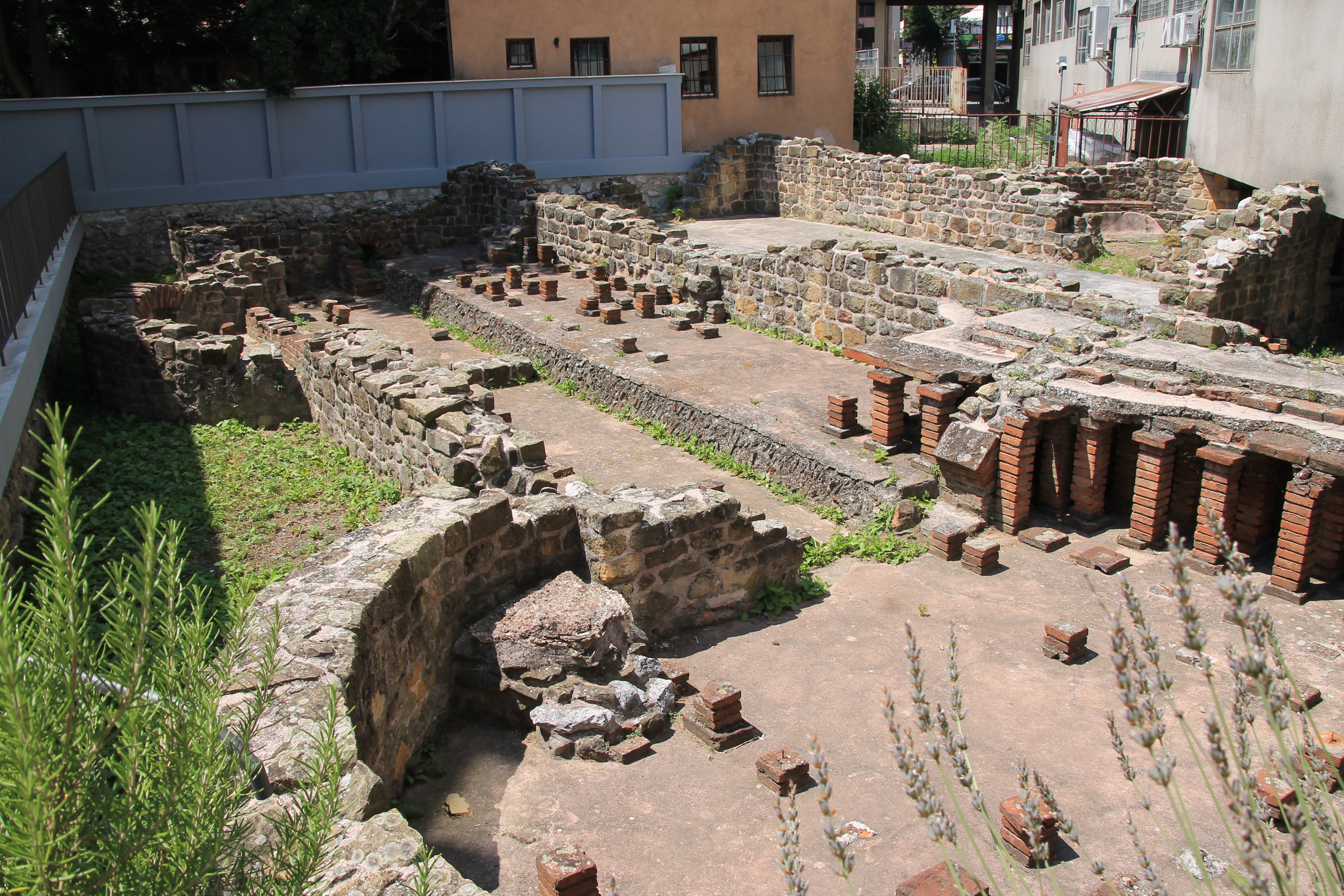
The Roman thermae in Čačak

The town was inhabited in Roman times, with traces of the Roman settlement still visible today, like Roman Thermae built in the 2nd to 4th century period. These still stand behind a secondary school in the center of Čačak.

Nearby, in the village of Gradina at the foot of the Jelica mountain, a Roman compound (fort) with a martyrium and necropolis has been excavated, with three churches, one of which produced a pentanummion for the late Roman Emperor Justinian in the 526–537 period. Justinian is also believed to have founded the fort in the 530s. The presence of burnt layers on the sight could be evidence that the settlement was destroyed in the conflict that characterized the region following the barbarian invasions of the late Roman Empire. In the same region, in the 6th century, four other forts were built.

=== Middle Ages ===
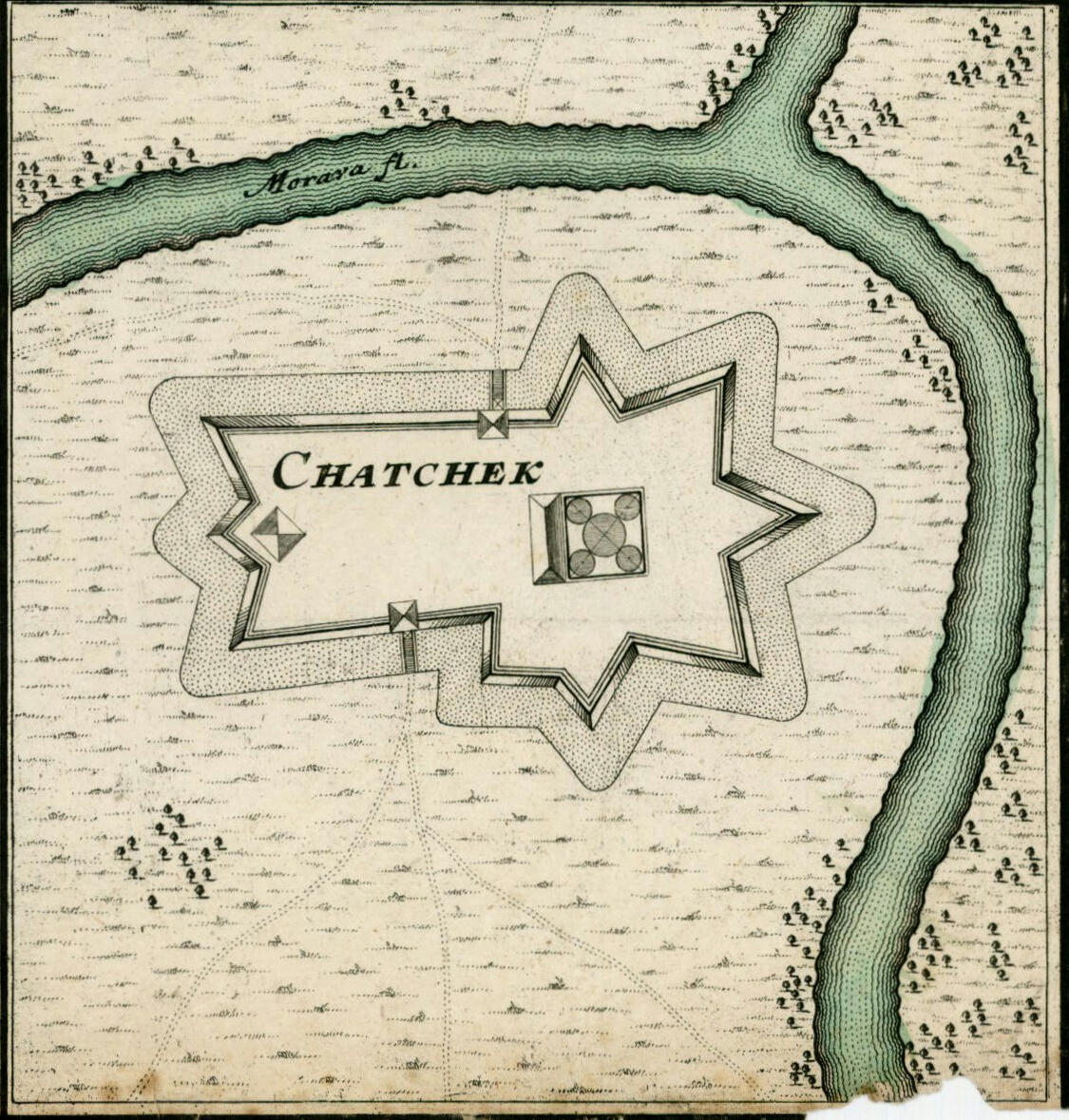
A map of the fortifications of Čačak on the Morava River during Habsburg rule, 1738

Slavs settled the area during the reign of the Byzantine Emperor Heraclius (610–641). From 1168 to 1189, after incorporation into the First Bulgarian Empire and then various Serbian states, Stefan Nemanja's brother Stracimir Zavidović controlled the West Morava region, including the city, then known as Gradac. Stracimir, a Serbian župan, raised the Church of Our Lady of Moravian Gradac at the highest point of the town.

In 1459, the Turks completed their conquest of the area, incorporating it into the Sanjak of Smederevo and converting Stracimir's church into a mosque. The town's name was changed from Gradac to the current Čačak.

=== 16th century–present ===
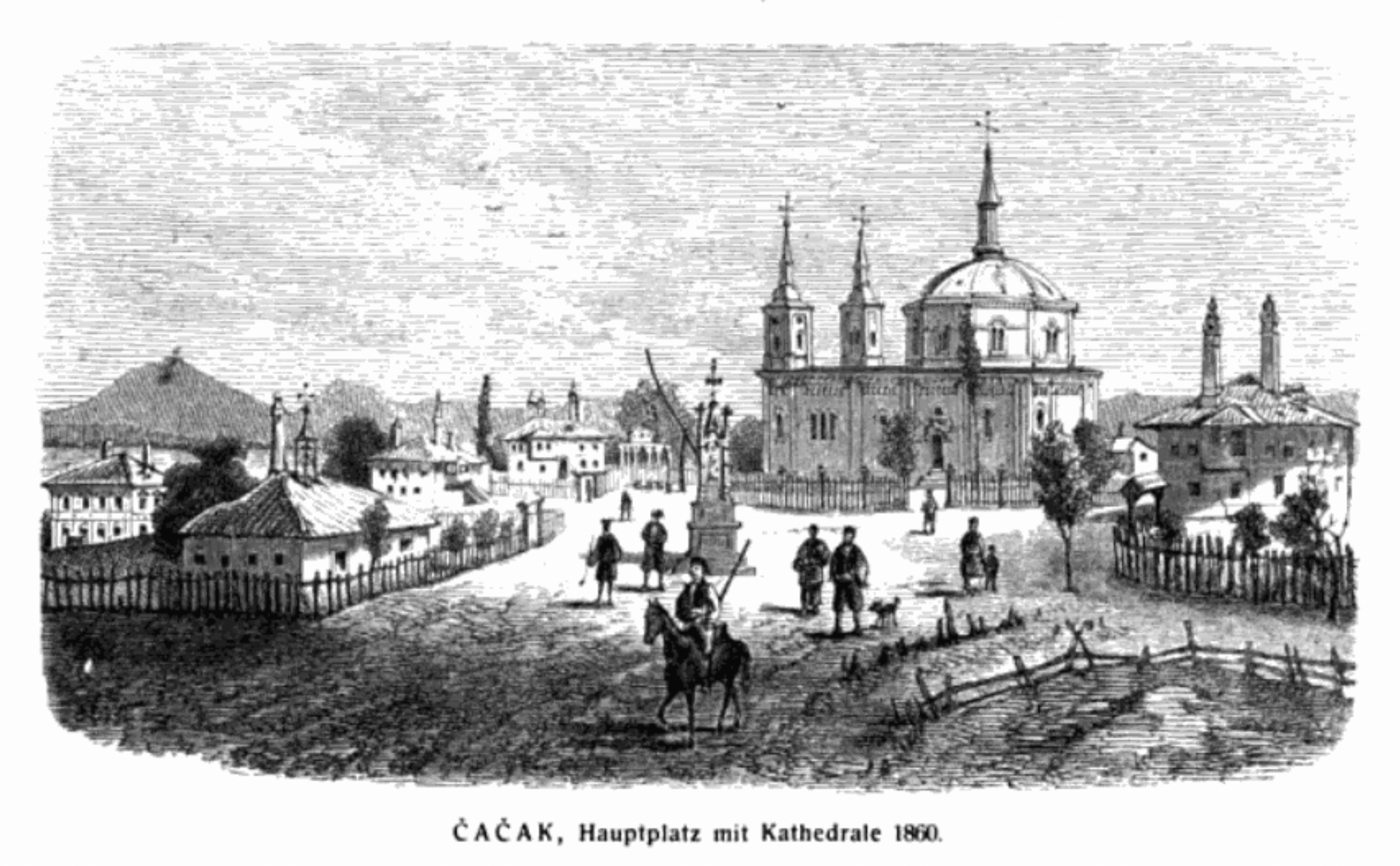
Čačak in 1860

Evliya Çelebi, an Ottoman explorer of the 16th and 17th centuries, described Čačak as the main place in the local kadiluk. In 1717, Čačak became a part of the Habsburg Empire after the Austrians defeated Ottomans, signing the Treaty of Passarowitz. Austrian rule was short-lived, and 21 years later Čačak would again become a part of the Ottoman Empire. Most of Čačak's Serb residents at the time of reconquest had deserted the town, migrating north safety in the Habsburg Empire. In their stead were settlers from Montenegro, Bosnia and Hercegovina and Vlachs from the countryside nearby.

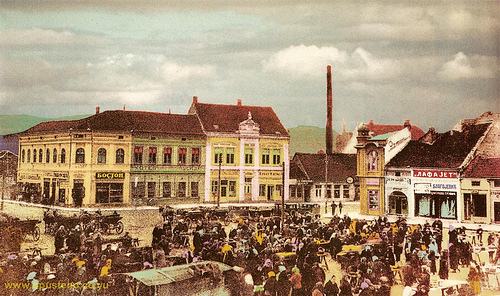
Čačak at the beginning of 20th century

Čačak has two years on its coat of arms. The first is 1408, in which Ragusan archives first name the town. The second is 1815, the year the Second Serbian uprising began and the year the Battle of Ljubić was fought in the hills near Čačak. This battle is famous for one of the greatest Serbian rebel victories. Then a small group, the rebels defeated a much stronger Ottoman army numbering 5,000–12,000 men. Soon after, the Principality of Serbia, one of the first nations liberated from Ottoman rule, secured its independence.

In 1837, one of the first Serbian grammar schools was completed. In the 1837–1941 period Čačak gradually modernized, with its town center modeled in a Vienna Secession style popular at the time and standing to this day. During World War II, Čačak was part of the short-lived Republic of Užice, which, while the first liberated territory in Europe, was cut off by German forces shortly after it was founded. On 4 December 1944 Čačak was finally liberated by the Yugoslav Partisans. It has since evolved into a large town and a regional center, later being given the official status of a city within today's Republic of Serbia.

== Settlements ==
Aside from the urban area of the city, the administrative area includes the following 58 settlements:

- Atenica
- Baluga (Ljubićska)
- Baluga (Trnavska)
- Banjica
- Beljina
- Bečanj
- Brezovica
- Bresnica
- Vapa
- Vidova
- Viljuša
- Vranići
- Vrnčani
- Vujetinci
- Goričani
- Gornja Gorevnica
- Gornja Trepča
- Donja Gorevnica
- Donja Trepča
- Žaočani
- Zablaće
- Jančići
- Ježevica
- Jezdina
- Katrga
- Kačulice
- Konjevići
- Kukići
- Kulinovci
- Lipnica
- Loznica
- Ljubić
- Međuvršje
- Milićevci
- Miokovci
- Mojsinje
- Mrčajevci
- Mršinci
- Ovčar Banja
- Ostra
- Pakovraće
- Parmenac
- Petnica
- Preljina
- Premeća
- Pridvorica
- Prijevor
- Prislonica
- Rajac
- Rakova
- Riđage
- Rošci
- Slatina
- Sokolići
- Stančići
- Trbušani
- Trnava

== Demographics ==
Historical population
Year	Pop.	±%
1948	18,525	—
1953	23,724	+28.1%
1961	34,586	+45.8%
1971	48,981	+41.6%
1981	61,741	+26.1%
1991	70,012	+13.4%
2002	72,698	+3.8%
2011	73,331	+0.9%
2022	69,598	−5.1%

As of 2011 census, the city's administrative area or municipality has 115,337 inhabitants, with 73,331 living in Čačak proper. As of 2022 census, the city proper has a population of 69,598, while the administrative area has 105,612.

The city of Čačak has 38,590 households with 2.99 members on average. The number of homes is 51,482.

The city's religious structure is predominantly Serbian Orthodox (110,281), with minorities including atheists (577), Catholics (168), Muslims (73), Protestants (21) and others. Virtually the entire population speaks the Serbian language (112,505).

The composition of population by gender and average age:

- Male – 55,995 (41.42 years) and
- Female – 59,342 (43.95 years).

A total of 53,543 citizens older than 15 have a secondary education (54.01%), while 14,823 citizens have some sort of tertiary education (14.95%). Of those with a tertiary education, 9,386 (9.47%) have university education.

=== Ethnic groups ===
The city is mostly inhabited by Serbs (96.14%), followed by minorities of Roma, Montenegrins and other ethnic groups.

Being located on a crossroads between the Ottoman Empire and Austria-Hungary during the 19th century, Čačak was home even to people of ethnicities that were not common in Čačak's region. One such example was a small Armenian community which began to settle from 1885, fleeing the forcible draft into the Ottoman army and the general oppression against the Armenians in the empire. Most members of this community worked in the coffee business. By the 1950s most of them had emigrated as the new Communist authorities, in the massive process of nationalization after World War II, confiscated Armenian businesses.

The ethnic composition of the city is given in the following table (as of 2011 census):

Ethnic group	Population	%
Serbs	110,886	96.14%
Roma	530	0.46%
Montenegrins	328	0.28%
Croats	105	0.09%
Yugoslavs	117	0.10%
Macedonians	112	0.10%
Russians	34	0.03%
Others	3,225	2.80%
Total	115,337	

== Society and culture ==
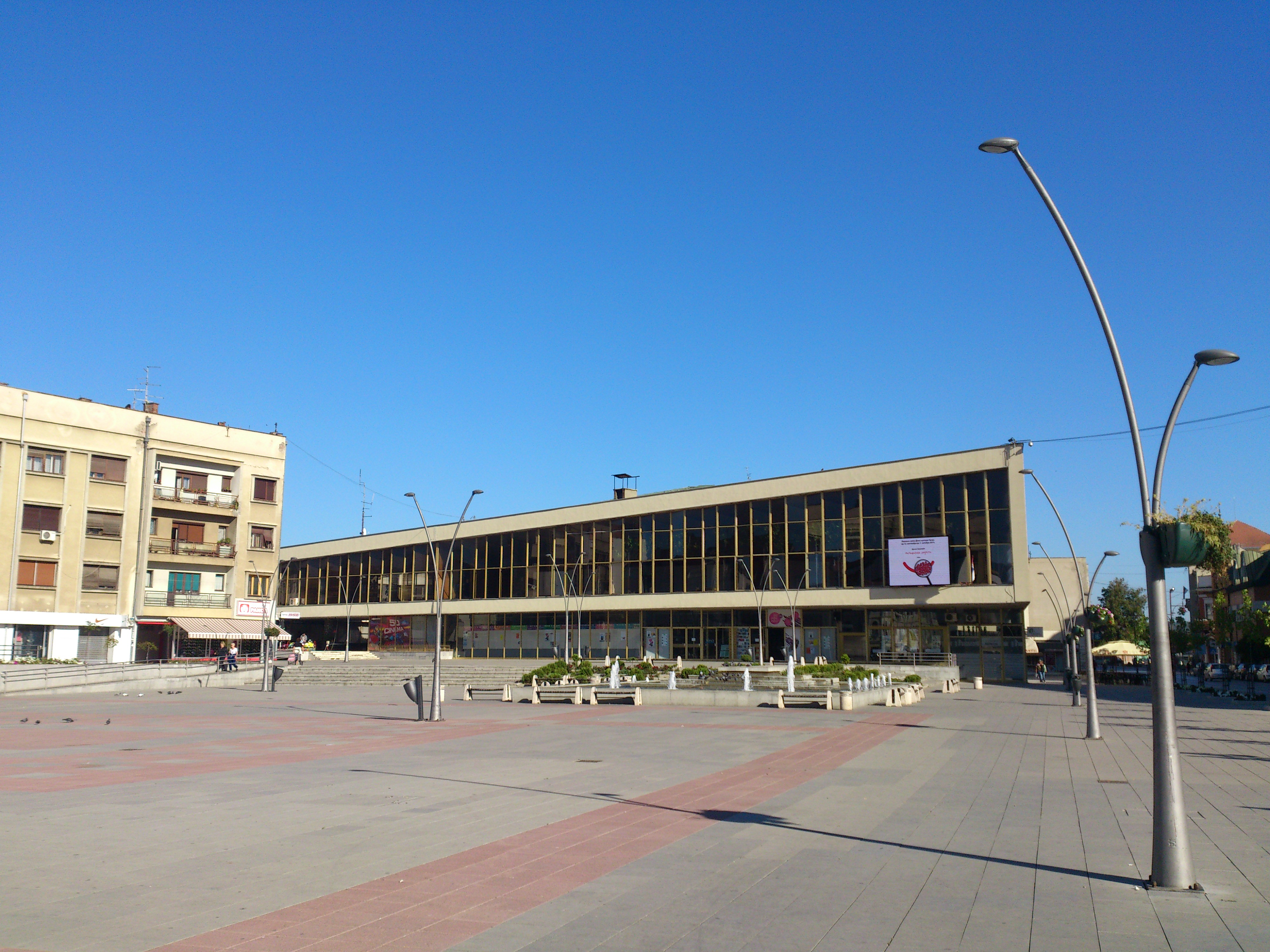
View on Dom kulture Čačak

The city has undergone changes in its development over time. Its architectural features, monuments, and cultural institutions reflect aspects of its history and cultural heritage..

During the theatrical season there are numerous theatrical ensembles on tour from all of Serbia at cultural centre Dom kulture Čačak. Centre is home to "Drama Studio" and schools of ballet, fine art and sculpture. The exhibitions and performances, cultural and literary evenings are held at numerous places such as: "City Library Čačak", "Nadežda Petrović" and "Risim" galleries, "National Museum" in Čačak, "Salon of Photography" and "Intermunicipal Historical Archive of Čačak" among many others. The current artwork production in the city can be followed through the auspices of groups and associations, private galleries, colonies and numerous enthusiasts.

Fine art and sculpture colonies are most often held at the Ovčar Banja spa resort. There are numerous cultural, musical, entertainment and tourist manifestations within the city and close surroundings, which attract multitudes of followers of ethno-culture, original folk music, like the "Dis spring", Memorial to Nadežda Petrović and the "Flute festival" in the nearby village of Prislonica. Also, newly established festivals "DUK Festival" and rock festival "Priča" attract younger population from the city and its region. Čačak is also home to events such as "Pitijada", "Kupusijada", "Fijakerijada" and other festivals that celebrate old traditions belonging to Serbs.

In Guča, 10 kilometres (6.2 mi) south from Čačak, every year the Guča trumpet festival is held, one of the most popular festivals in the Balkans, alongside the Exit festival (in Novi Sad).

=== Education ===
There are two faculties located in Čačak, which are a part of the University of Kragujevac:

- Faculty of Agronomy
- Faculty of Technical Sciences

There are seven secondary schools:

- Čačak's Grammar School (one of the oldest grammar schools in Serbia, 1837)
- High School of Economics
- Technical High School
- Medicine High School
- Machine High School
- Musical High School
- F&C School

There are many primary schools and childcare centers.

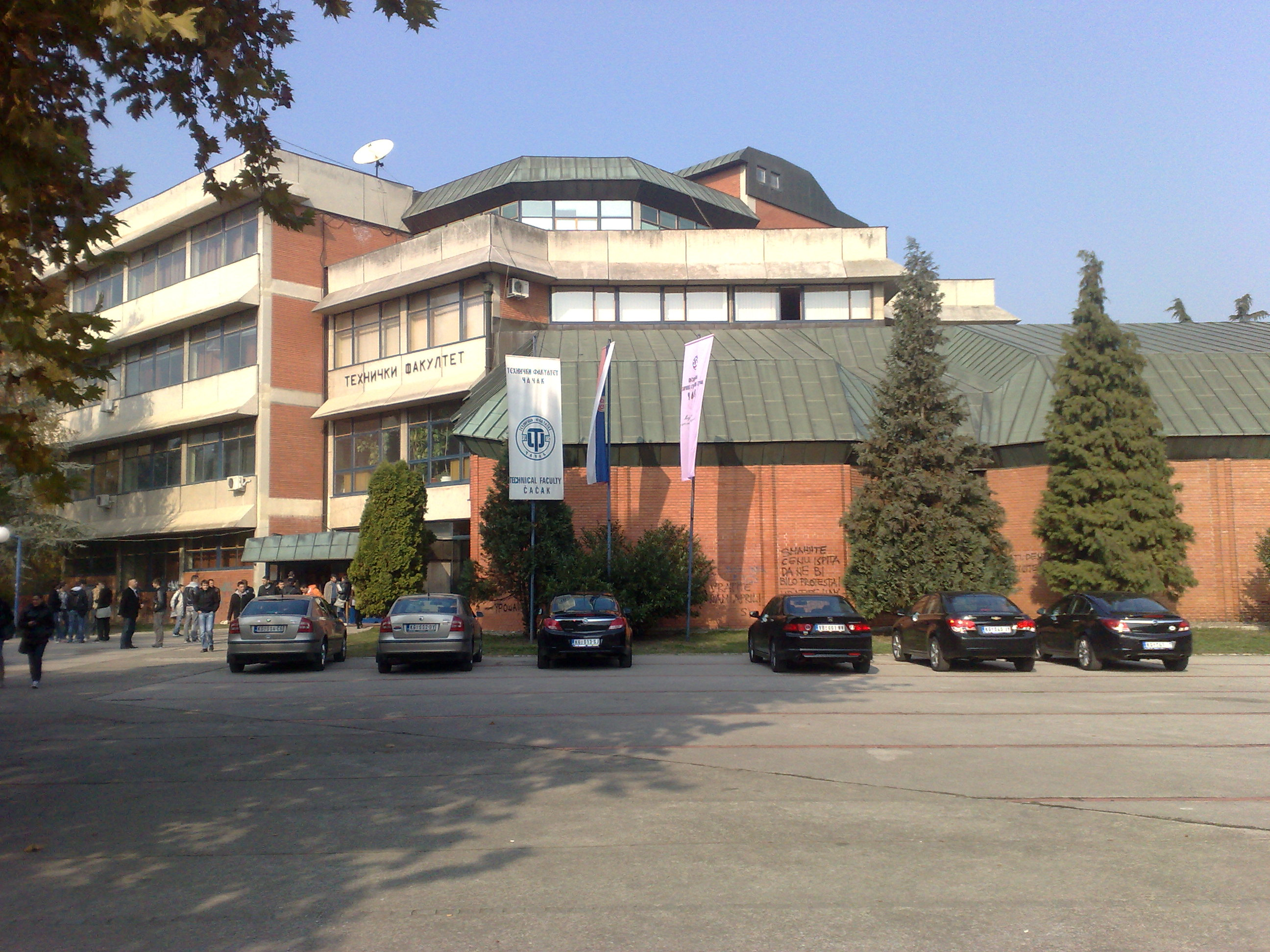
Faculty of Technical Sciences

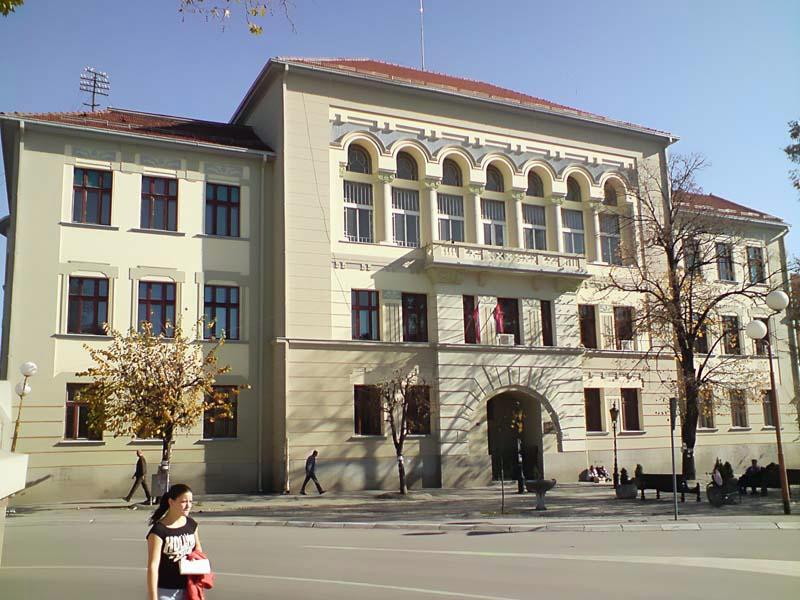
Čačak's Grammar School

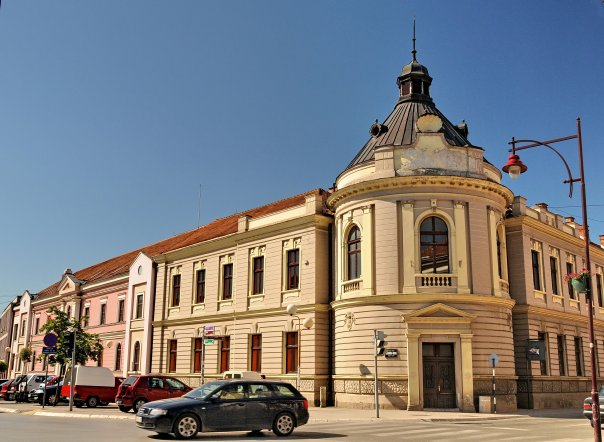
High School of Economics

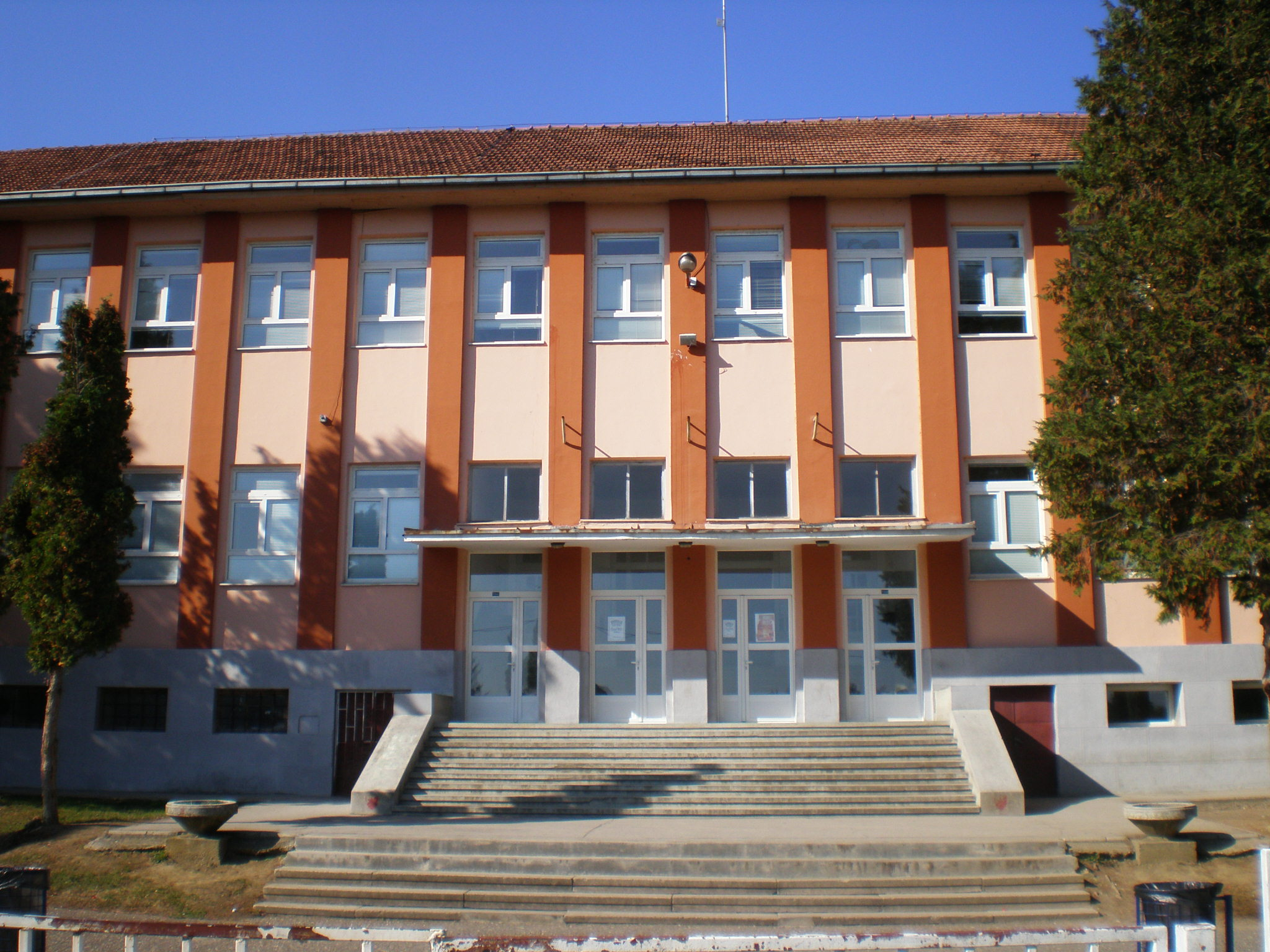
Technical High School

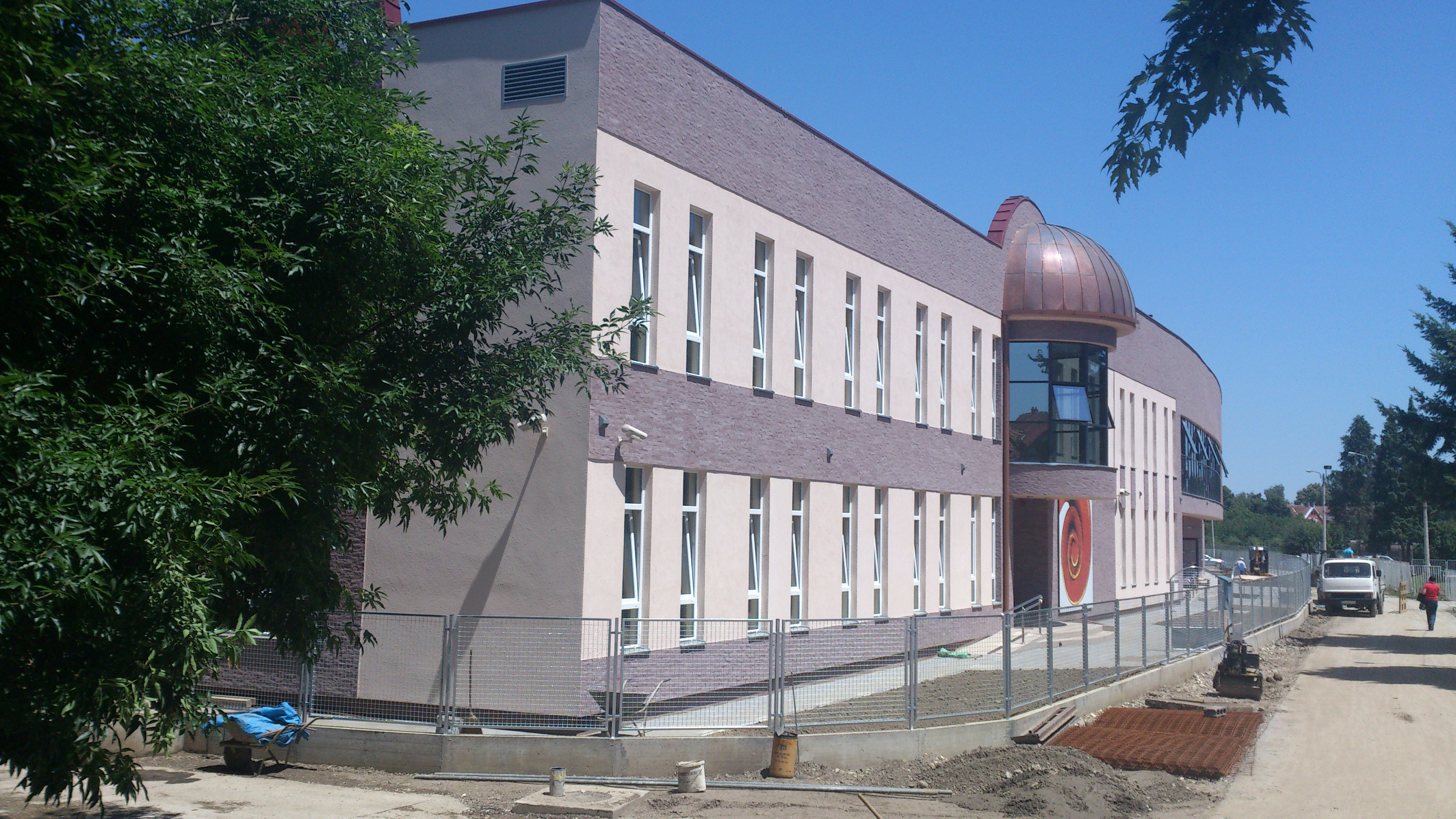
Musical High School

=== Sports ===
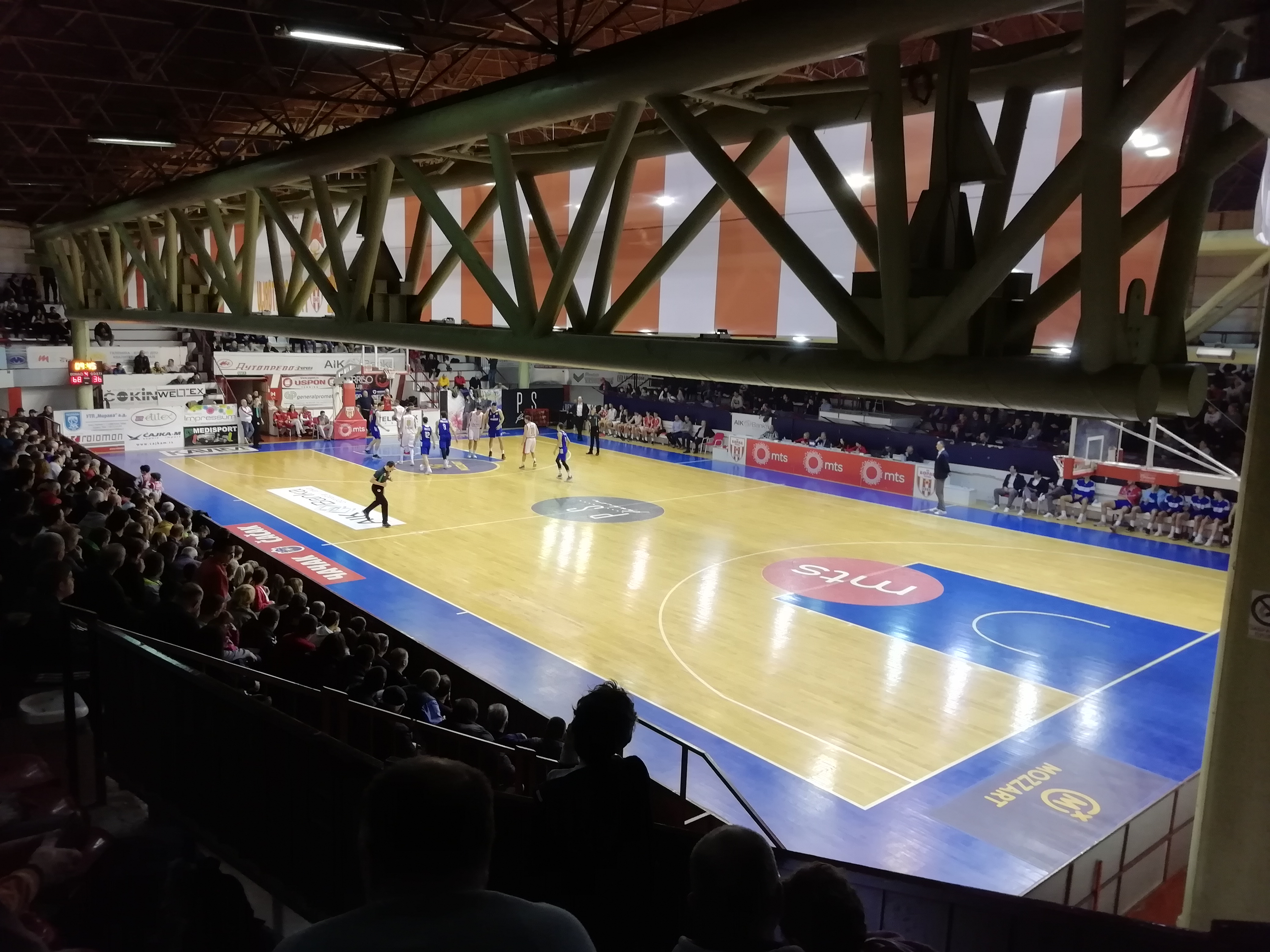
Borac Hall, February 2019

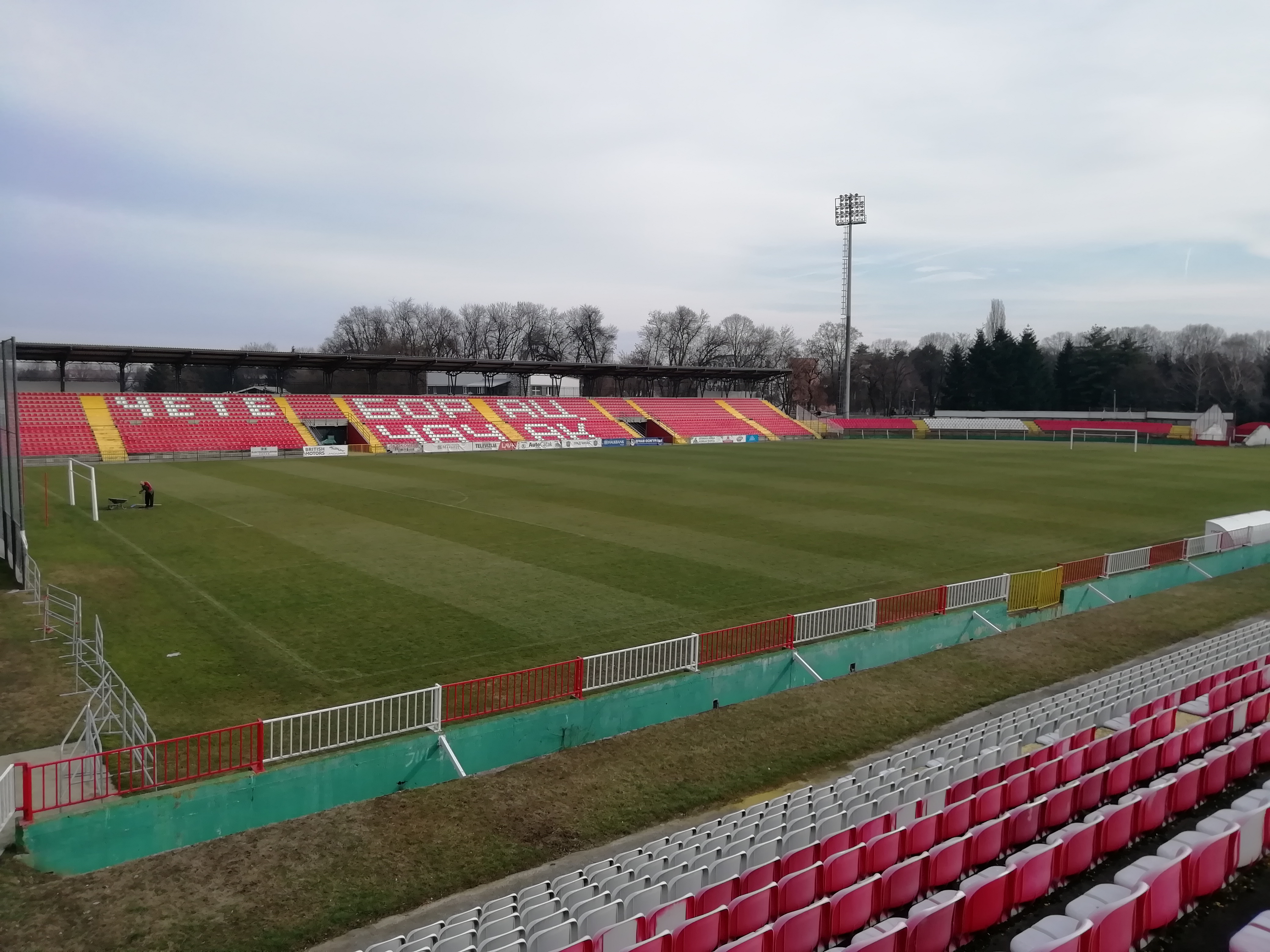
Čačak Stadium, February 2019

The "Mladost Sports Center" which is located on the coast of West Morava River, next to the Čačak Stadium, two faculties and numerous other important buildings, offers many sports venues for locals. The whole area where the Sports Center is located is the town's most important entertainment area.

Čačak is nationally famous for its clubs in various team sports; the most popular ones are basketball, football and handball. The basketball club Borac Čačak and football club Borac Čačak have been participating in the top-tier leagues of Serbia for many consecutive years with much success. Women's handball is also very successful and popular. Football clubs Sloboda and Remont have competed in Serbia's third tier.

=== Tourism ===
In the vicinity of Čačak there are more than 20 churches and monasteries, the largest number found on such a small area in Serbia. They represent cultural and historic monuments of great significance. The most important ones are the Church of the Ascension of Jesus, a church on Ljubić hill dedicated to Saint Tsar Lazar, as well as the Vujan Monastery located on a nearby mountain of the same name. Special value is attributed to the monasteries of the Ovčar-Kablar Gorge, which as a cultural and historic whole date back to the Middle Ages and represent the particularity of the region's cultural and artistic heritage created over the centuries. There are 12 monasteries and churches in the gorge:

- Uspenje
- Vavedenje
- Jovanje
- Nikolje
- Blagoveštenje
- Vaznesenje
- Preobraženje
- Sretenje
- Sveta Trojica
- Ilinje
- Savinje
- Kadjenica

Thermal and mineral springs with medicinal properties provide the basis for the development of recreational tourism. There are three spa resorts within the territory of the city of Čačak: Gornja Trepča, Ovčar Banja and Slatinska Banja. There are also picnic sites: Gradina and the "Battle and victory" park (also called "Spomen" (remembrance) park) on the Jelica mountain, the Memorial complex on Ljubić hill, Grujine fields, rafts on West Morava river in Beljina, Parmenac, Međuvršje and Ovčar Banja, and picnic sites on the tiny rivers called Dičina, Kamenica, Čemernica and Banja.

=== Image gallery ===
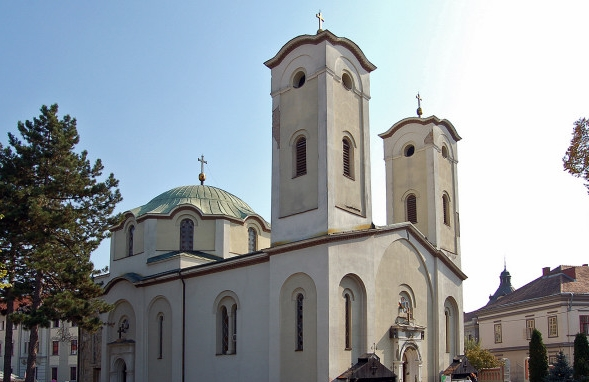
Crkva Uzašašća Isusova

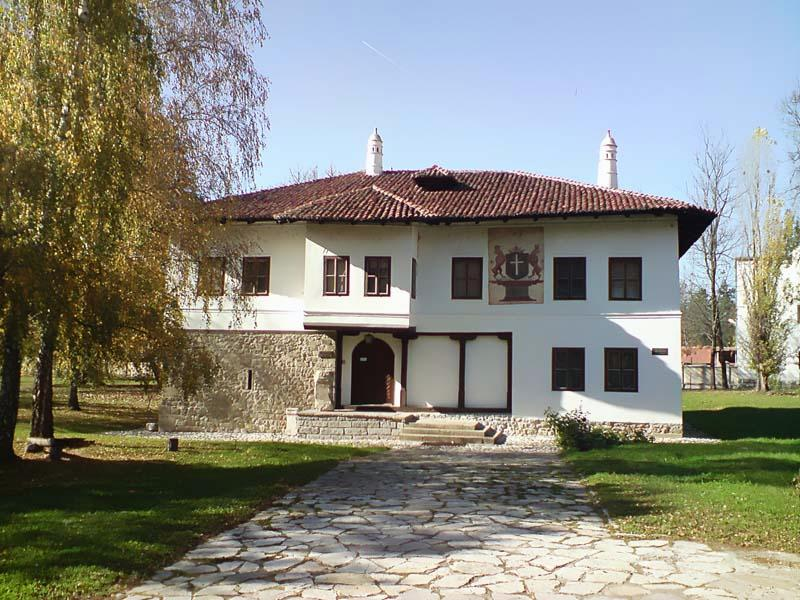
Nacionalni muzej u Podgrađu

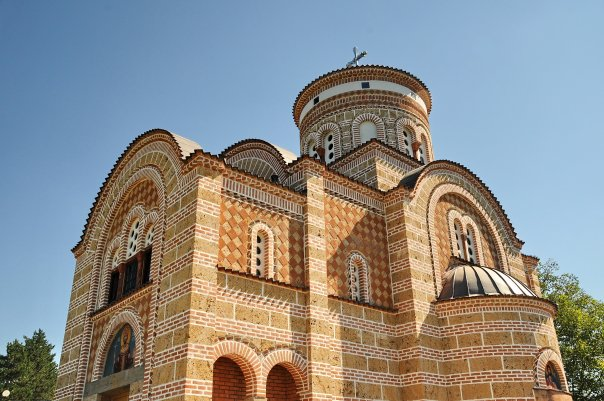
Crkva Svetog Tsar Lazar na Kljaić brdu

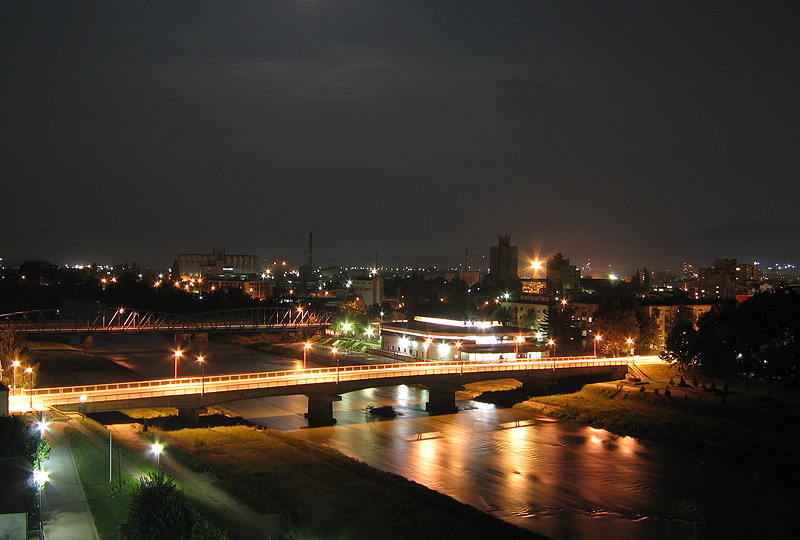
Most na West Morava rijeci i Šimunić jezeru

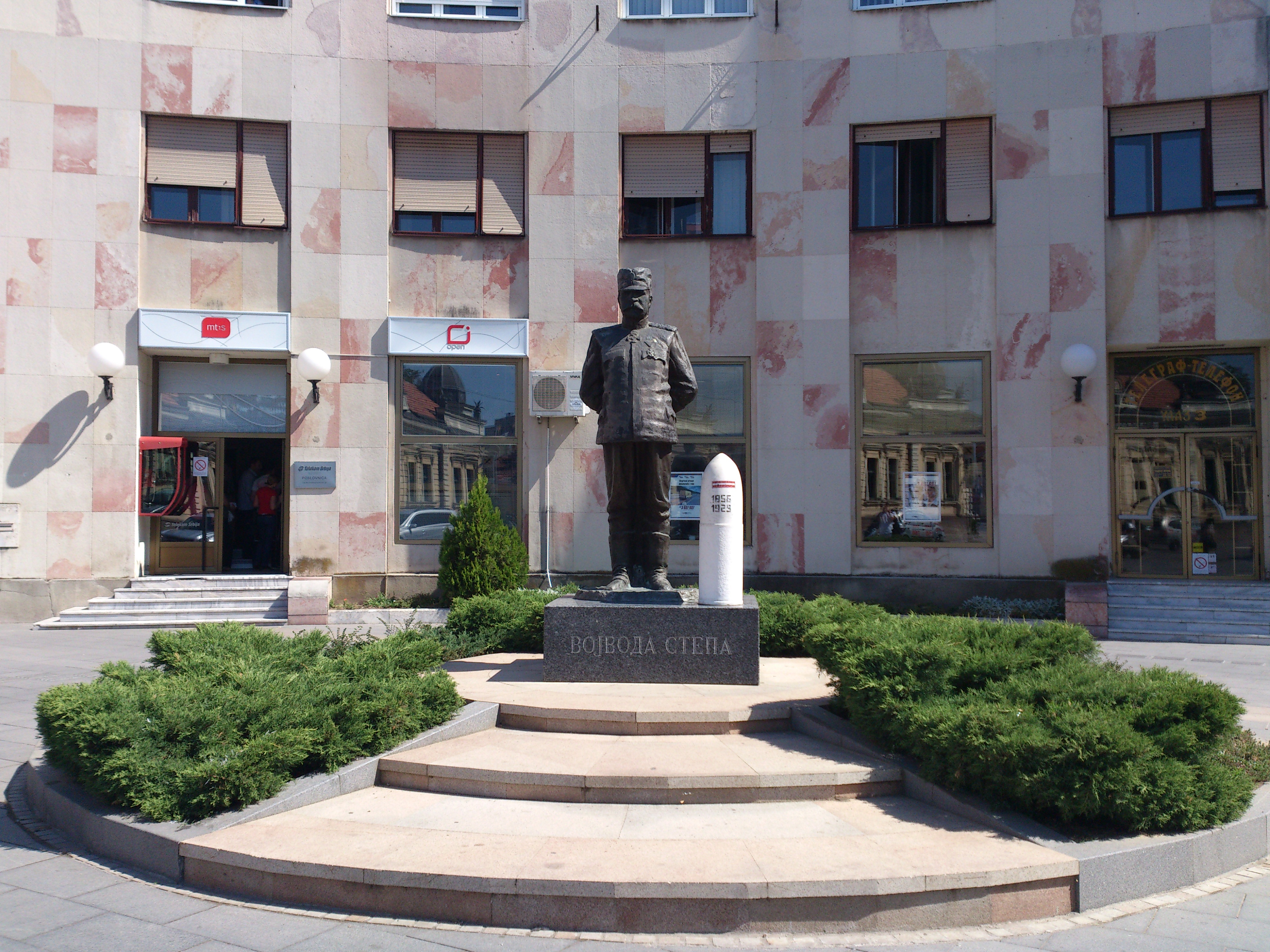
Monument to Stepa Stepanović

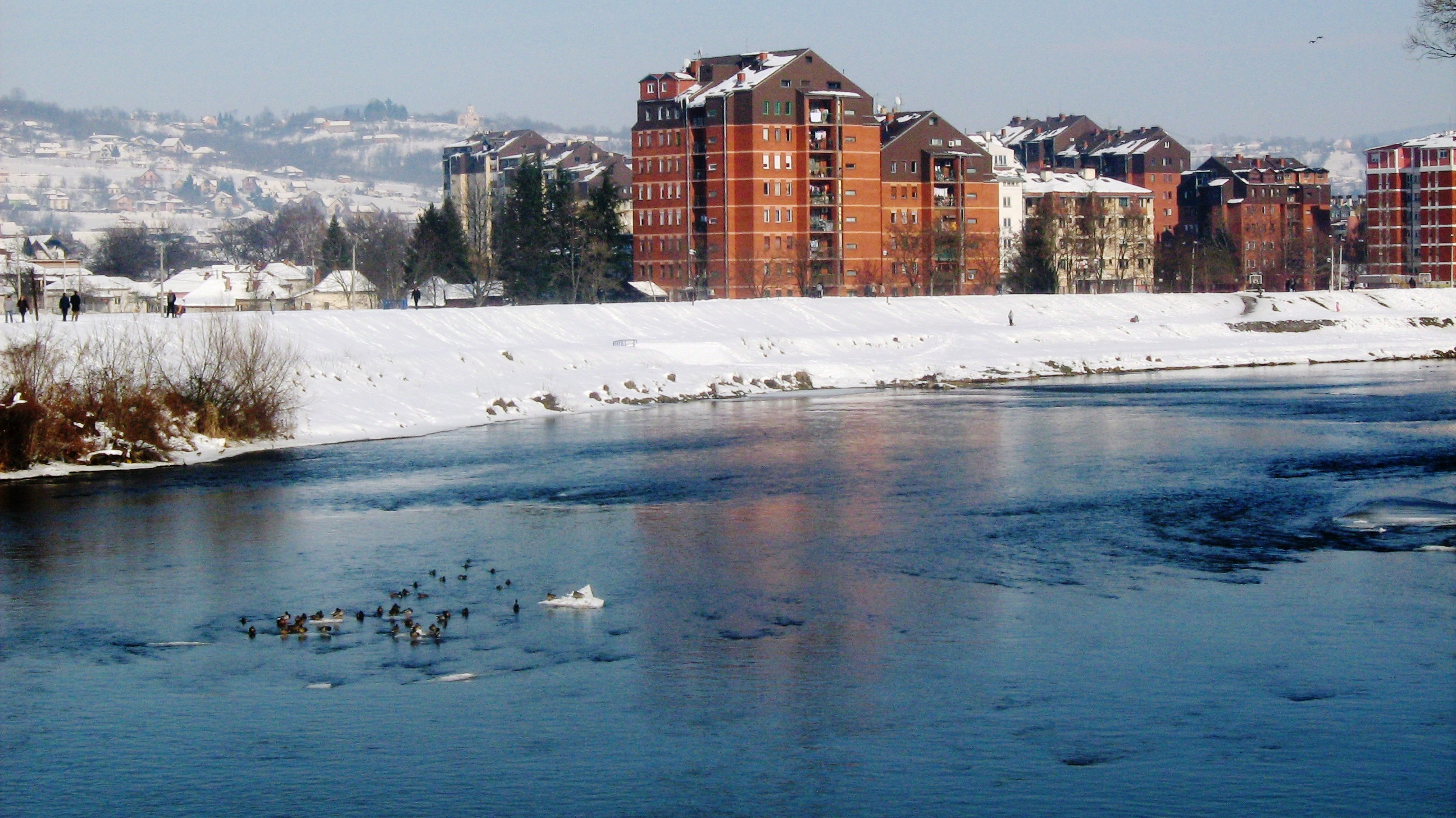
View on Ljubić from West Morava in winter

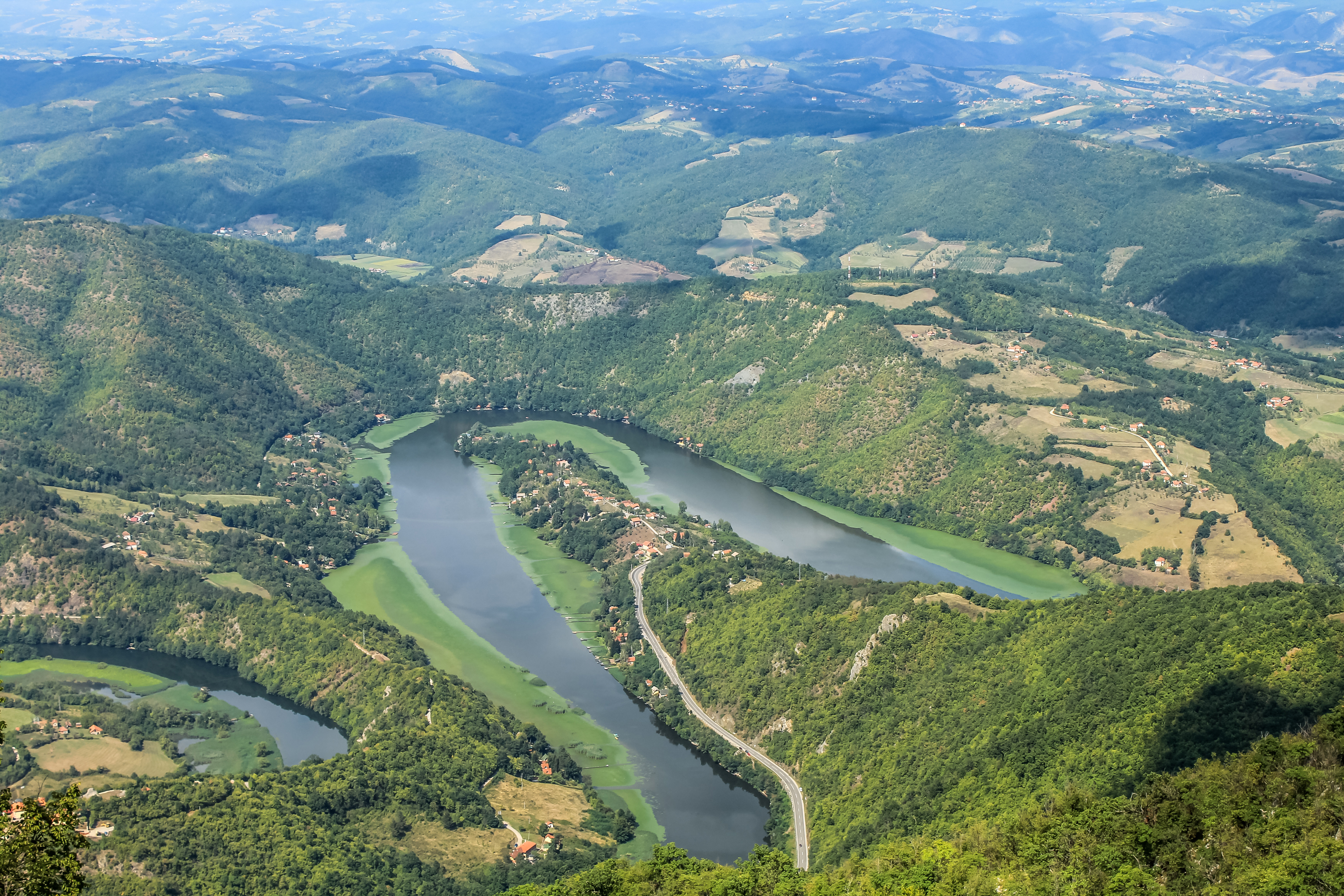
West Morava meanders in Ovčar-Kablar Gorge

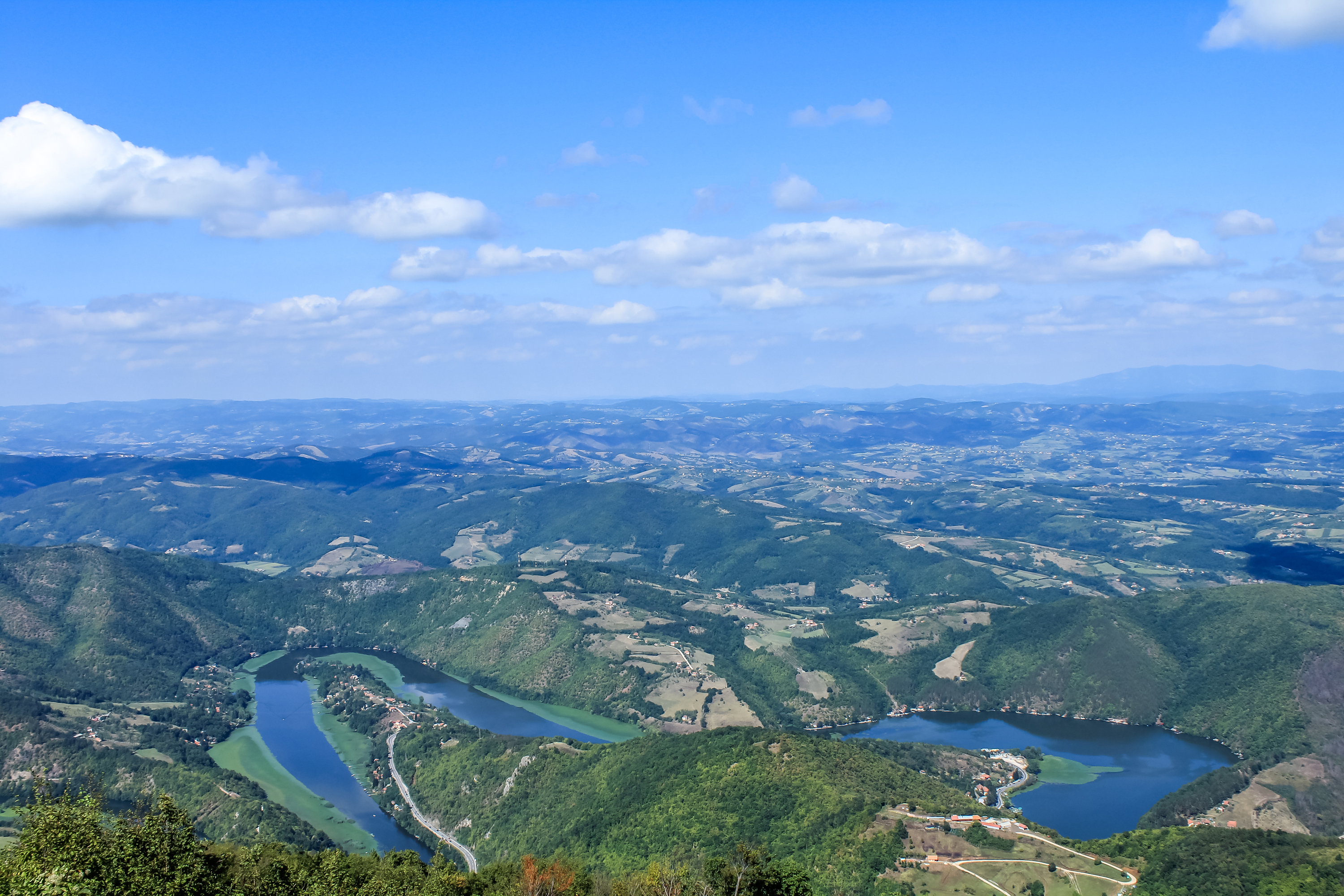
West Morava meanders in Ovčar-Kablar Gorge

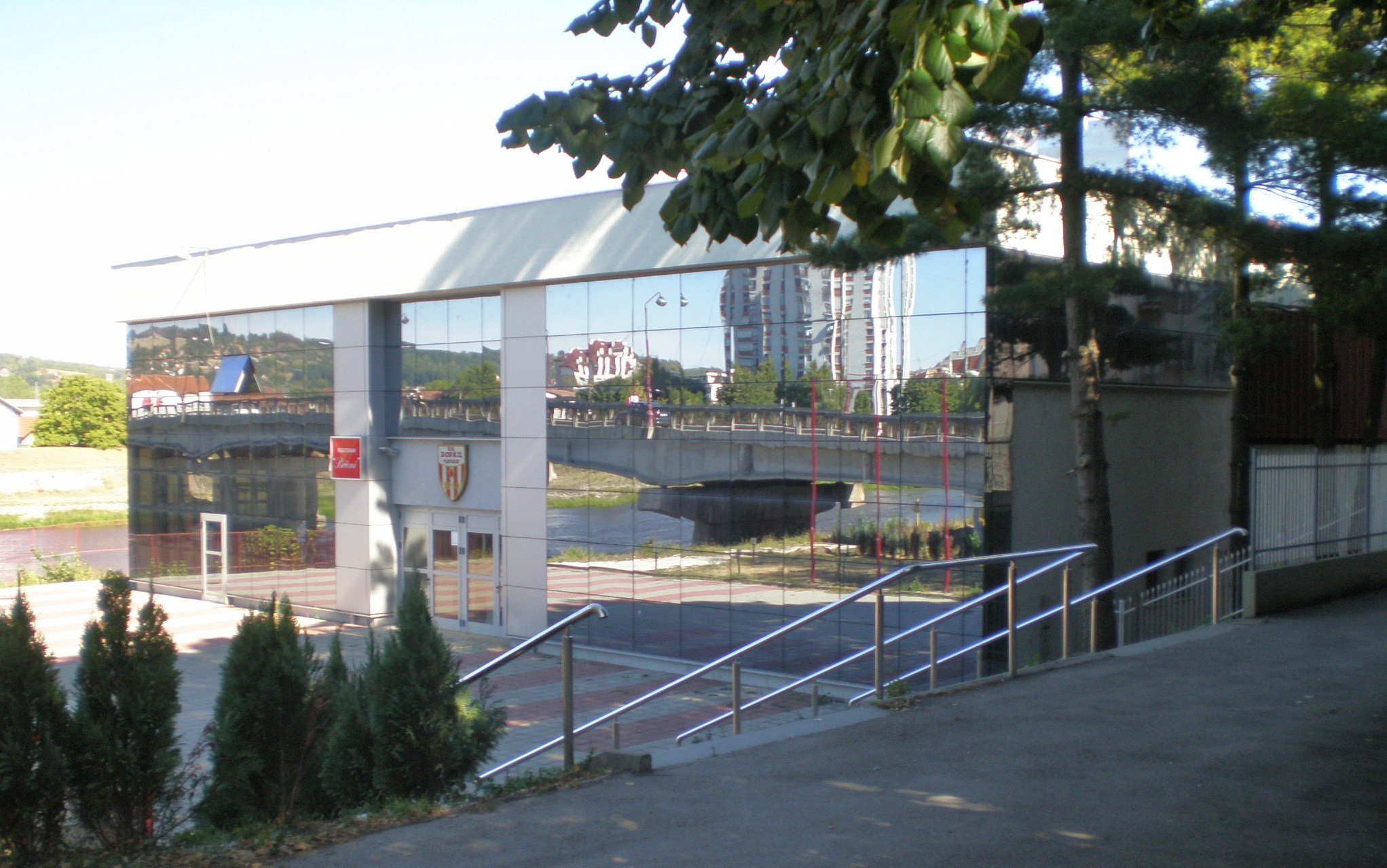
KK Borac Sports Hall

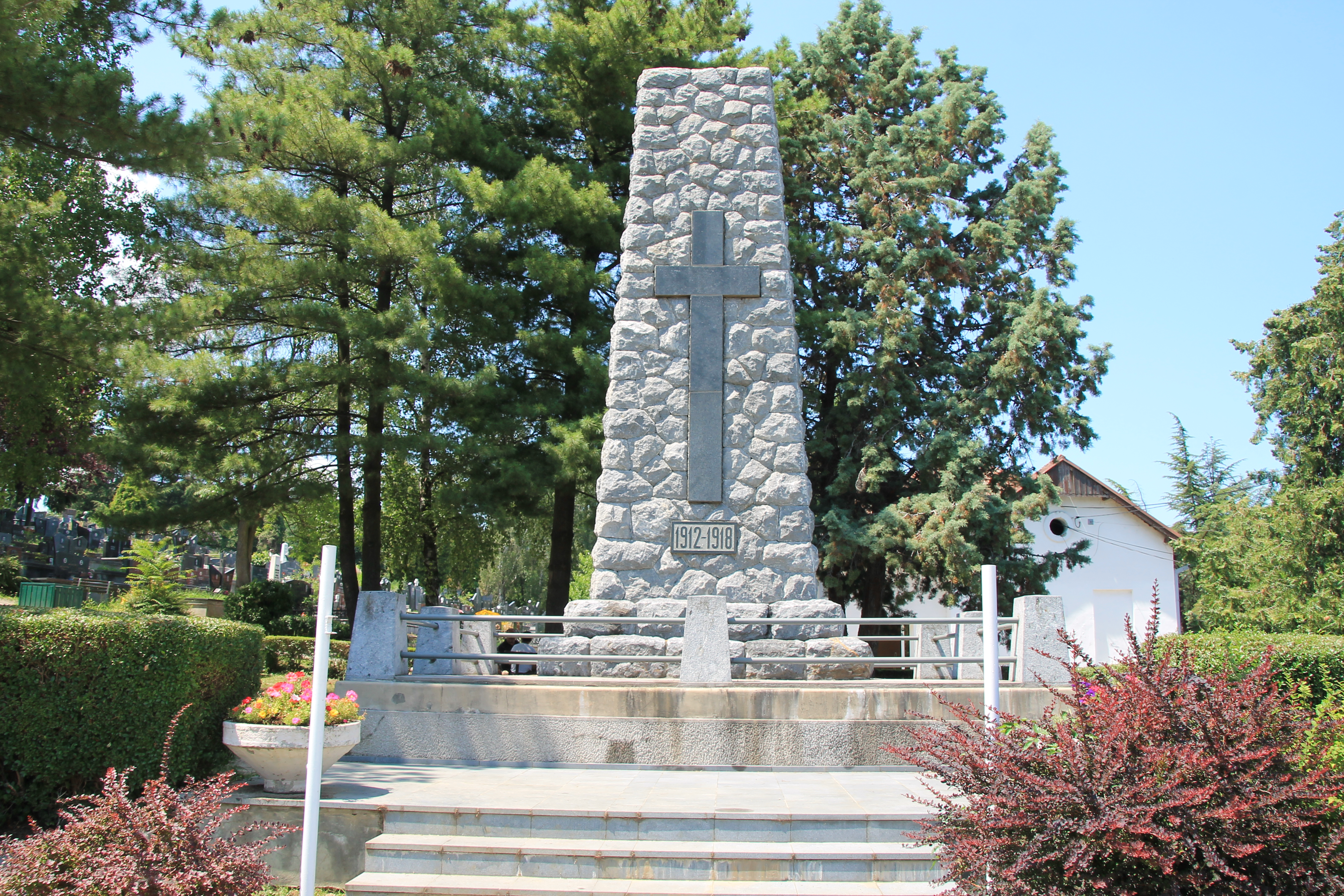
The monument to the fallen soldiers of the Balkan Wars and World War I

== Architecture and Urbanism ==
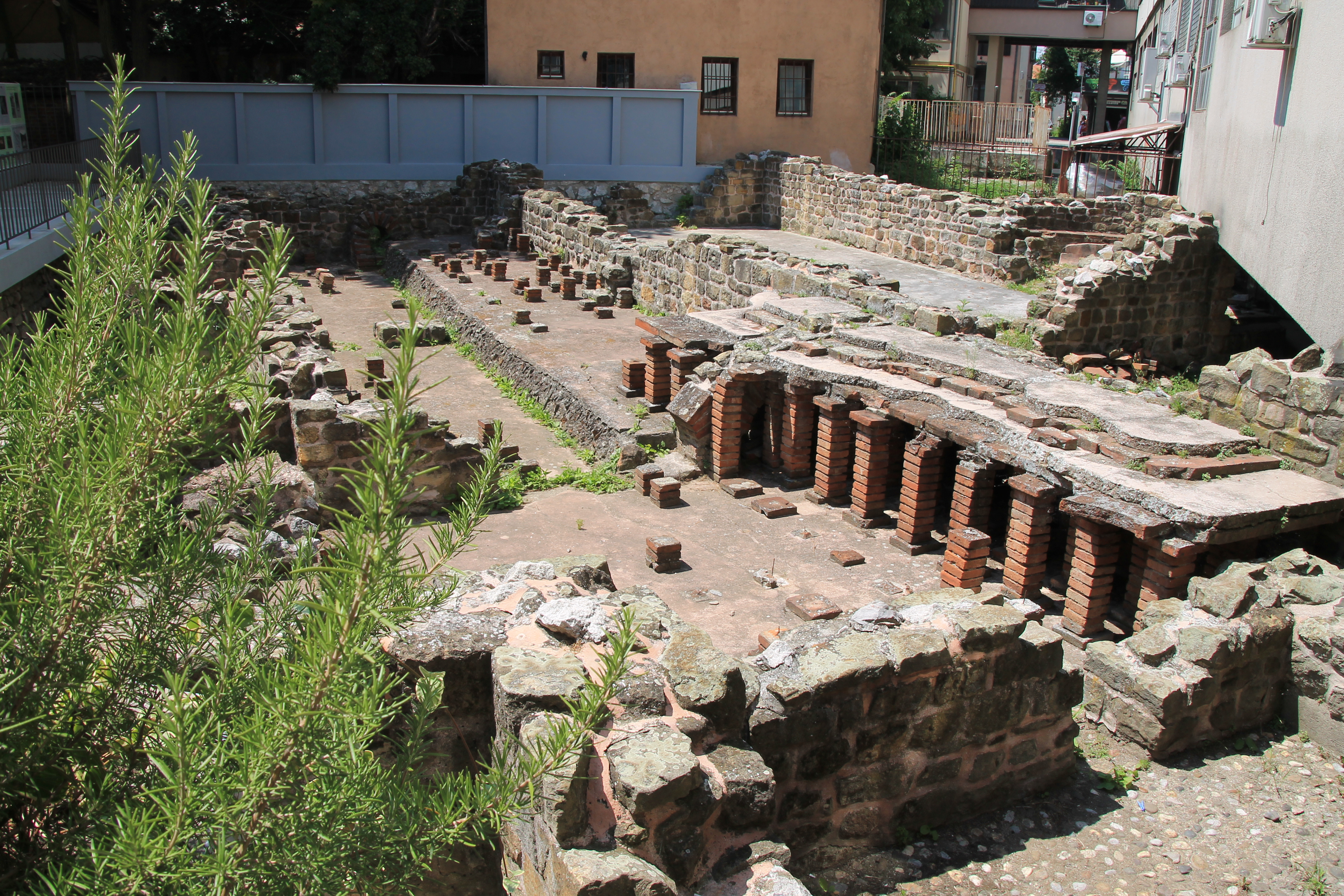
Roman Baths

Čačak is one of those cities with a long, continuous history of habitation. Various cultures have developed on this land, leaving lasting influences on the city's urban structure and enriching it with archaeological artifacts. Among these, the Roman baths are the earliest material evidence of the city's history, dating back to the 4th century AD, when this area was part of the Roman province of Dalmatia. These baths highlight the cultural development of the region in the centuries prior to the arrival of the Serbs.

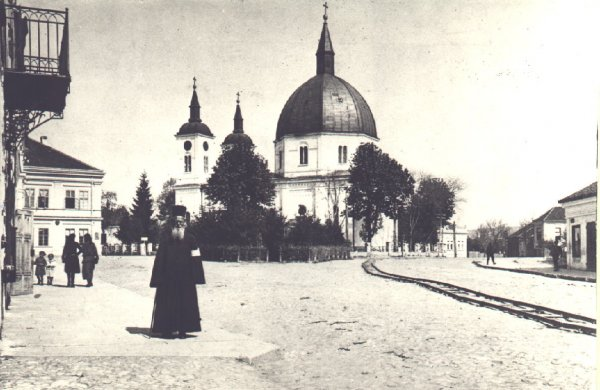
Old Čačak – The Church

The earliest written mention of a building in today's Čačak appears in the Studenica typikon (1207–1215), which references the Church of Our Lady of Gradac, built by Stracimir and dedicated to the Ascension of Christ (the site of the current church in Čačak).

Čačak's urban structure reveals an unplanned, organically developed layout, shaped by both natural conditions and human influences over time. Findings from medieval and ancient periods do not define the city's structure, but they suggest the approximate extent of its early expansions.

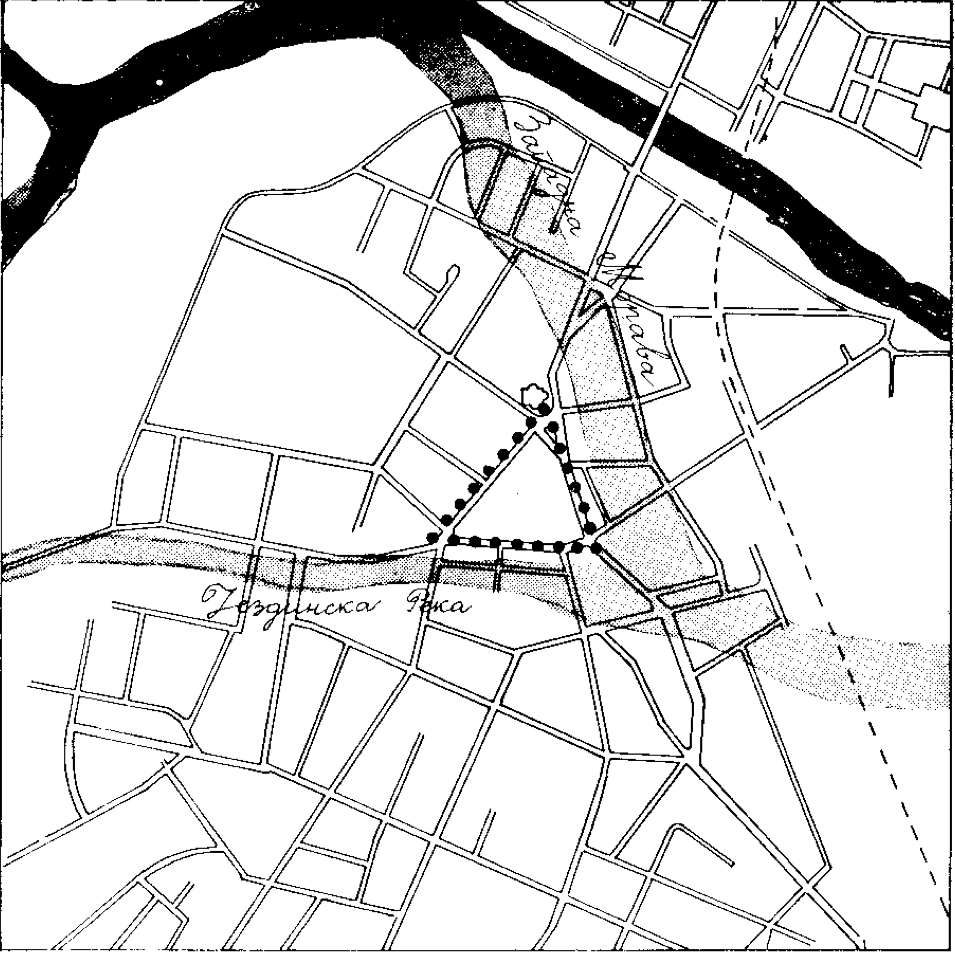
The Triangular Block – by the mid-19th century, the West Morava River flowed much closer to the city center, passing just east of the church.

The current urban structure of Čačak took shape during the 19th century in two main phases. The first phase occurred under the rule of Prince Miloš Obrenović, when the city core developed around the church, with a square on the southeastern corner of a triangular block. During the second phase, in the latter half of the century, Čačak expanded further as its economy strengthened. The first industrial buildings emerged, and older public structures built in traditional styles were replaced with more durable, eclectic architecture. Representative examples from these phases include the Gospodar Jovan’s Konak from the first phase, and the District Head Office building, a classicist structure, from the second. However, most 19th-century buildings were constructed with weaker materials, limiting their longevity. By the end of the 19th and early 20th centuries, many of these early buildings were replaced by sturdier structures, though the established urban pattern was largely respected. This period saw a rise in shops and artisan workshops in the center, with residential buildings surrounded by courtyards and gardens on the outskirts.

Čačak's first comprehensive Town Regulation Plan was created in 1860 by engineer Dragoljub Urgičić, though it has not been preserved. The second regulatory plan, completed in 1893 by engineers Svetozar Jovanović and Stanislav Kučevski, marked the city's first complete urban arrangement plan. This plan is a valuable resource for understanding the evolution of both Čačak and Serbian urbanism from the late 19th century. It exemplifies a conservative approach to urban development, aiming to respect the existing layout while facilitating the city's orderly growth.

Early 20th-century postcards depict Čačak as an open, sprawling silhouette within a scenic basin, harmonizing its irregular forms with road directions and strips of varied greenery.

In conclusion, the streets of Čačak in the first half of the 20th century possessed a valuable ambiance, with potential for future transformations that would continue to shape the Serbian urban landscape.

== Economy ==
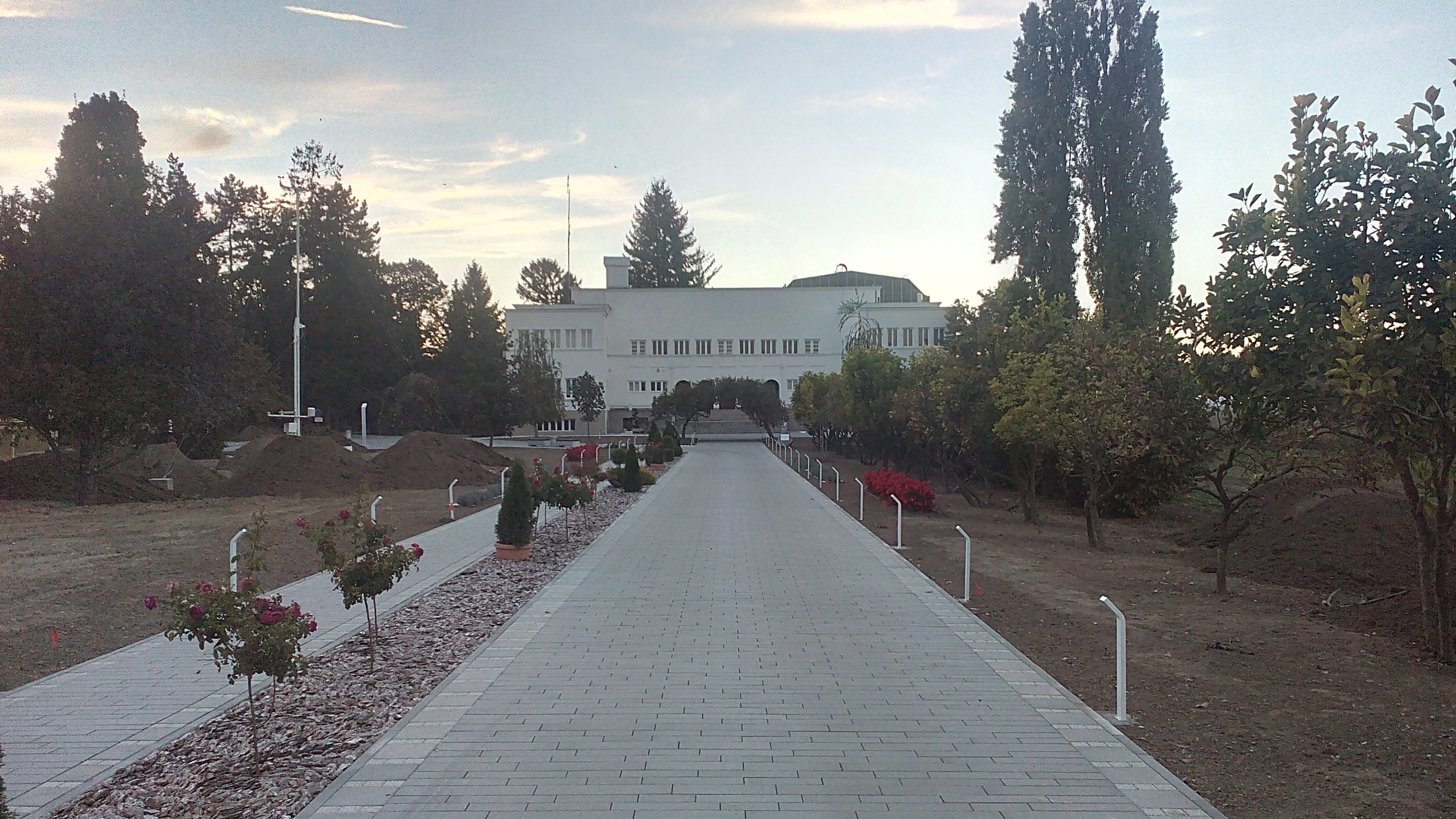
Fruit Research Institute in Čačak

The structure of the economy of the city of Čačak is composed of services and trade, industry and agriculture. The main processing industries are paper production, electric home appliances, blade tools for the processing of metal, non-metals, chemical industry products, thermal technical appliances, metal and combined carpentry, parts and kits for the pharmaceutical industry and products for medical needs. Also, well developed are wood, lumber industry and agriculture.

Many companies with more than 250 employees have deteriorated due to the sanctions in the 1990s. Since 2000, more than 40 government-owned companies have gone through the privatization process.

Private enterprise, which has its tradition from back in the 19th century, is the primary characteristic of the economy of the city. As of January 2017, 98.65% of all business enterprises are small and micro companies. A large number of private companies grew into middle-size companies with 80 to 270 employees offering a wide variety of products. Today, on the territory of the city of Čačak, among the largest employers are Sloboda, Technical Overhaul Military Institute (Remont), Hospital Čačak, Fabrika reznog alata and P.S. Fashion. Čačak also has the prestigious and country's unique Fruit Research Institute located in city center zone.

For the 2017 calendar year, business enterprises in Čačak imported the goods in value of 269 million euros, and exported goods in value of 171 million euros. The coverage of imports by exports was 64%.

Economic preview

The following table gives a preview of total number of registered people employed in legal entities per their core activity (as of 2022):

Activity	Total
Agriculture, forestry and fishing	167
Mining and quarrying	55
Manufacturing	11,489
Electricity, gas, steam and air conditioning supply	333
Water supply; sewerage, waste management and remediation activities	408
Construction	1,527
Wholesale and retail trade, repair of motor vehicles and motorcycles	6,859
Transportation and storage	3,233
Accommodation and food services	1,506
Information and communication	798
Financial and insurance activities	601
Real estate activities	102
Professional, scientific and technical activities	1,133
Administrative and support service activities	1,042
Public administration and defense; compulsory social security	1,400
Education	2,520
Human health and social work activities	2,162
Arts, entertainment and recreation	530
Other service activities	477
Individual agricultural workers	495
Total	36,838

== Transportation ==
Due to its geographical position, Čačak is the main road transportation center in Western Serbia. As of August 2019, Miloš the Great motorway, which is projected to run from Belgrade to border with Montenegro, is in service from Belgrade bypass to Čačak with several other sections currently under construction. Also, the A5 motorway is planned and it will run from Čačak to Pojate, thus connecting two main motorways in Serbia. Čačak also lies on State Road 22 and State Road 23, two main highways in Western Serbia.

A railway from Kraljevo to Požega passes through Čačak, thus connecting the city with Belgrade–Bar railway (one of country's main railways). The Morava Airport, one of country's three international airports, was opened in 2019 for civil airplanes and is located between Čačak and Kraljevo.

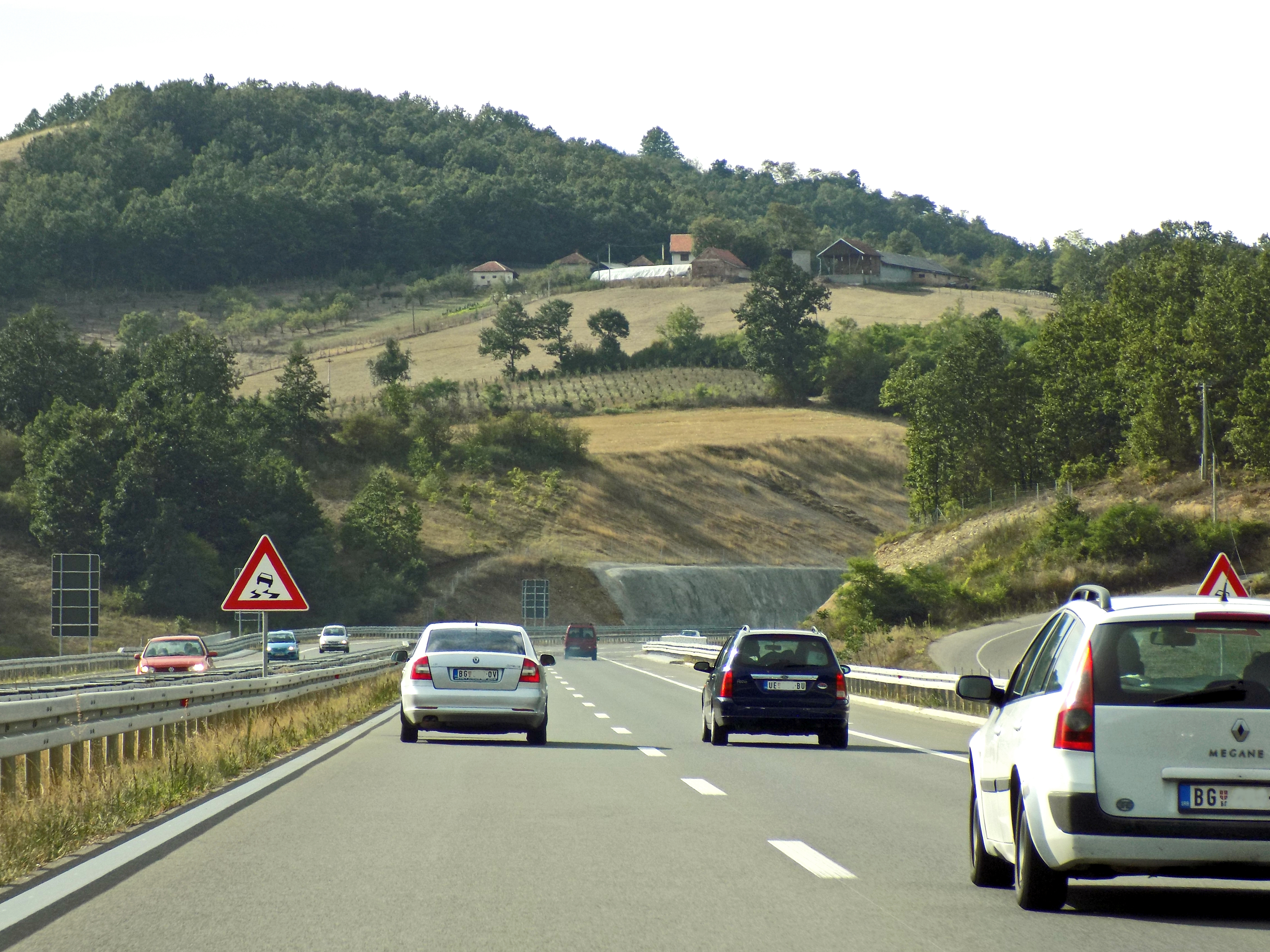
A2 motorway section near Čačak

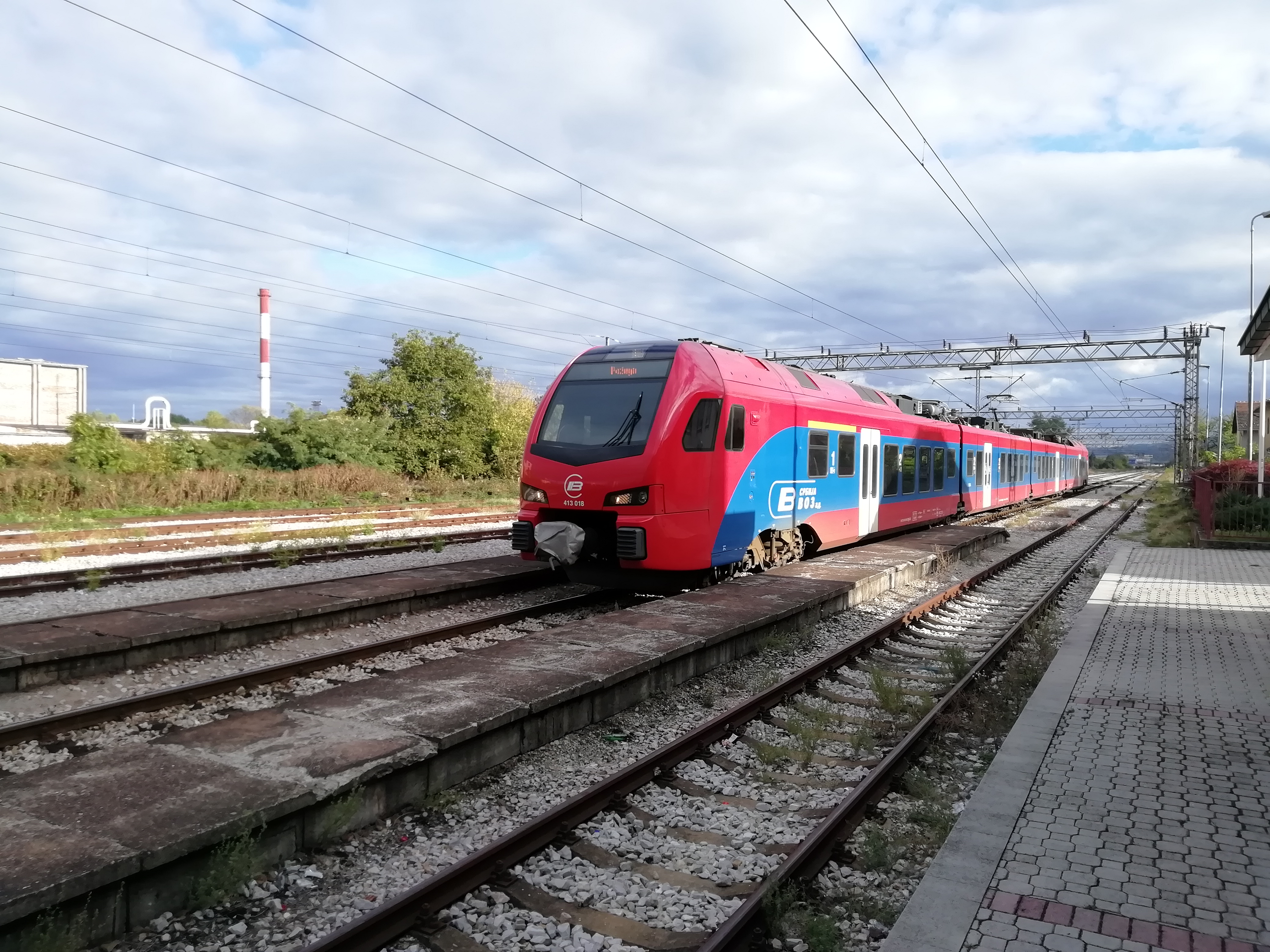
Srbija Voz train arriving at Čačak railway station

== Notable people ==
- Milica Dačić, politician
- Boban Dmitrović, football player
- Bora Đorđević, rock musician
- Branko Jelić, football player
- Danica Marković, poet and writer
- Darko Lazović, football player
- Dragan Kićanović, former basketball player and coach, Olympic, World and European champion
- Dragomir Čumić, actor
- Dragutin Gavrilović, military officer († 1945)
- Dušan Markešević, athlete
- Hadži Prodan Gligorijević, leader of the Hadži Prodan's Revolt († 1825)
- Ivan Stambolić, politician († 2000)
- Ivan Stevanović, football player
- Ivica Dragutinović, football player
- Filip Filipović, mathematician, revolutionary, first secretary of Communist party of Yugoslavia
- Filip Mladenović, football player
- Lazar Marković, football player
- Luke Black, pop singer
- Marko Lomić, football player
- Marko Marinović, basketball player
- Milan Jovanović, Montenegrin football player
- Milan Stojadinović, politician († 1961)
- Milivoje Vitakić, football player
- Miloš Minić, politician († 2003)
- Miloš Ristanović, Serbian professional footballer
- Milovan Destil Marković, artist
- Milovan Rajevac, football coach
- Miroslav Ilić, folk singer
- Mladomir Puriša Đorđević, film director and screenwriter
- Momčilo Perišić, general
- Nadežda Petrović, painter († 1915)
- Nemanja Kojić, athlete
- Serbian Patriarch Irinej, head of the Serbian Orthodox Church († 2020)
- Petar Stambolić, politician († 2007)
- Predrag Koraksić Corax, caricaturist
- Radisav Ćurčić, Serbian-Israeli basketball player, 1999 Israeli Basketball Premier League MVP
- Radmila Bakočević, soprano
- Radojko Avramović, football coach
- Radomir Mihailović Točak, rock guitarist
- Robert Kišerlovski, road bicycle racer
- Sonja Savić, actress († 2008)
- Stepa Stepanović, general from Balkan Wars and World War I († 1929)
- Stracimir Zavidović, 12th-century Serbian noble who ruled West Morava († after 1189)
- Svetolik Jakšić, diplomat, journalist, publicist († 1928)
- Tadija Dragićević, basketball player
- Tanasko Rajić, captain in Second Serbian Uprising († 1815)
- Tatomir Anđelić, mathematician († 1993)
- Uroš Tripković, basketball player
- Velimir Ilić, politician
- Vera Matović, folk singer
- Vlada Jovanović, basketball coach
- Vladan Vasilijević, politician and specialist in criminal law
- Vladislav Petković Dis, poet († 1917)
- Željko Obradović, former basketball player and coach, Olympic silver medalist, World, European and nine-time Euroleague champion
- Zoran Kostić (footballer), football player
- Petar Krsmanović, volleyball player, European champion

== International relations ==
=== Twin towns and sister cities ===
Čačak is twinned with:

Ruza, Ruzsky District, Moscow Oblast, Russia since 2012; Sochi, Russia since 2012; Valašské Meziříčí, Czech Republic since 2005; (Serbia) Bratunac, Republic of Srpska since 2001; Thonon-les-Bains, France since 1968	Brezno, Slovakia; Turčianske Teplice, Slovakia; Filippoi, Greece; Katerini, Greece; (Serbia) Han Pijesak, Republic of Srpska

== See also ==
- List of places in Serbia
- Ozon Radio
- Ovčarsko-kablarski manastiri

== Sources ==
- Pavlović, Dragoljub M. (1982). "Чачак 1405–1805" (PDF). Зборник радова Народног музеја у Чачку. XII. Čačak: Народни музеј Чачак: 137-.
