= Dom kulture Čačak =

- Дом културе Чачак
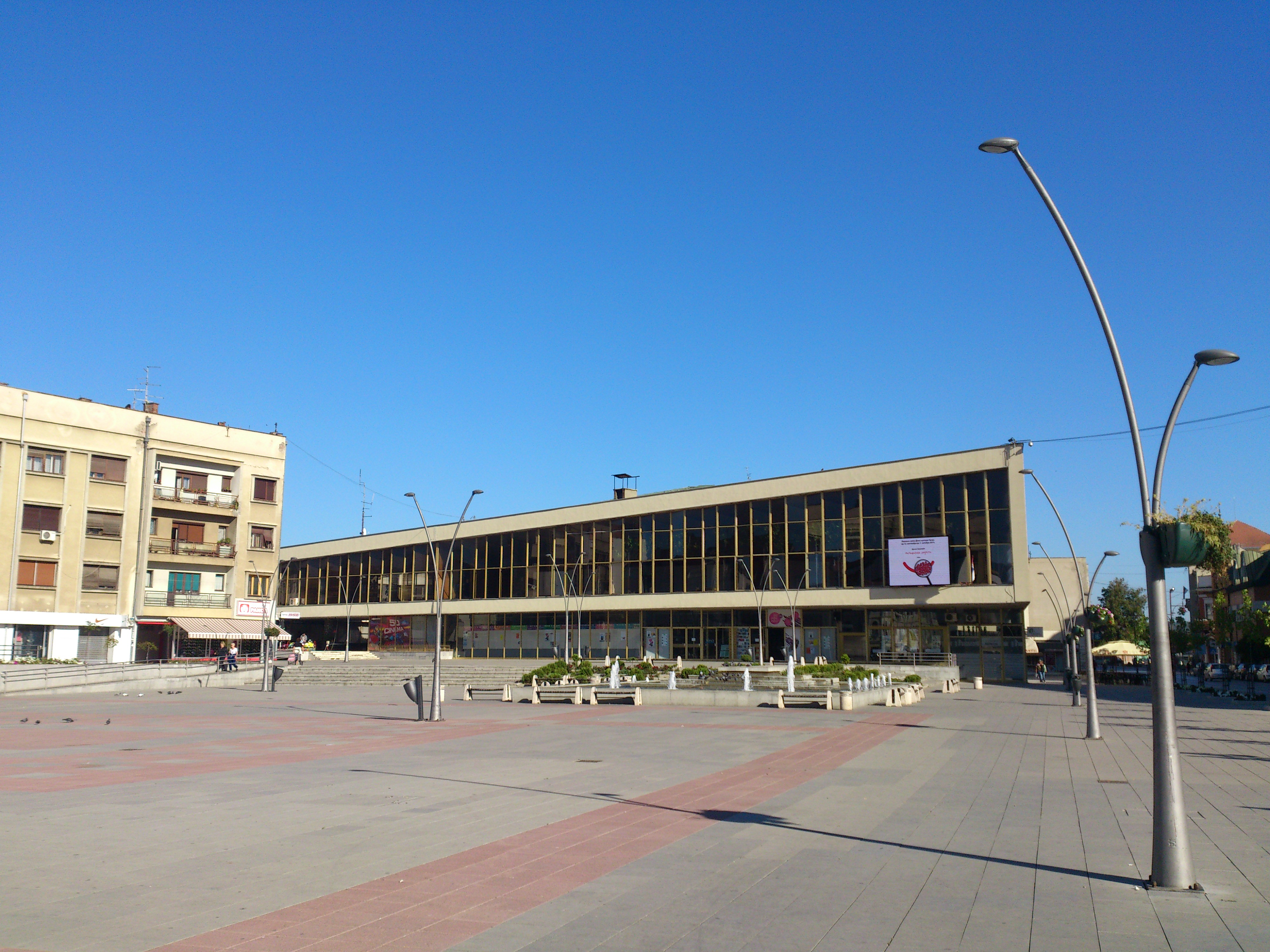
- Interactive map of Dom kulture Čačak
- Address: Trg narodnog ustanka 2
- Location: Čačak, Serbia
- Coordinates: 43.8920603°N 20.3476985°E
- Owner: City of Čačak
- Type: Cultural center
- Acreage: 6,108 m^{2} (65,746 sq ft)

Construction
- Opened: 1 July 1971; 55 years ago

Website
- www.domkulturecacak.org

Dom kulture Čačak (Anglicized: Cultural Center Čačak) is a cultural center located in Čačak, Serbia.

== History ==
It was founded on 1 July 1971, as the cultural center of the city of Čačak, located on the main city's square.

Dom kulture Čačak is also the home to the largest ficus in the Balkans, which was planted in 1971 when the works on the facility started. Since 2003, it has been the protected as the "natural wealth of third degree". The venue is also a host of the annual animation film festival "Animanima" held in November.

== Gallery ==
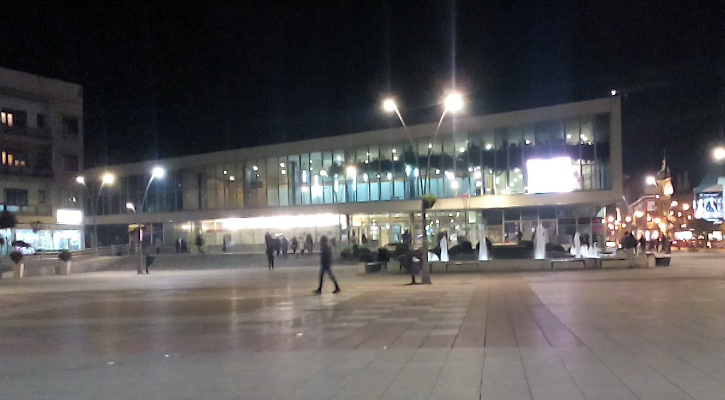
Dom kulture Čačak at night

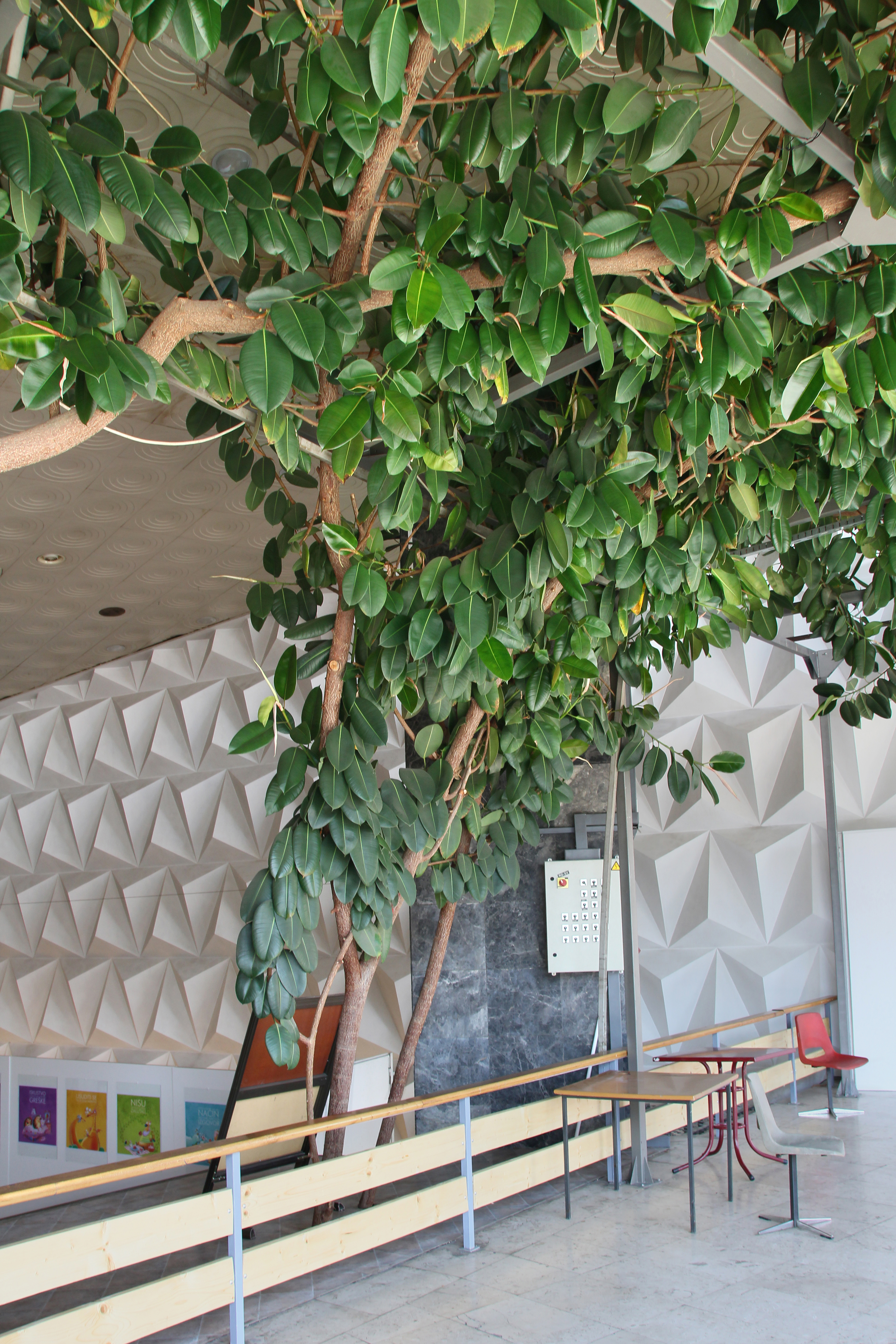
Ficus inside Dom kulture Čačak
