= Riđage =

- Village
- Location within Serbia
- Coordinates: 43°53′21″N 20°16′13″E
- Country: Serbia
- District: Moravica District
- Municipality: Čačak

Area
  - Total: 3.39 km^{2} (1.31 sq mi)
- Elevation: 353 m (1,158 ft)

Population (2011)
  - Total: 215
  - Density: 63.4/km^{2} (164/sq mi)
- Time zone: UTC+1 (CET)
  - Summer (DST): UTC+2 (CEST)

Riđage is a village in the municipality of Čačak, Serbia. According to the 2011 census, the village has a population of 215 people.
