= Beljina, Čačak =

Beljina Бељина
- Village
- Location within Serbia
- Coordinates: 43°52′48″N 20°19′02″E
- Country: Serbia
- District: Moravica District
- Municipality: Čačak

Area
  - Total: 1.97 km^{2} (0.76 sq mi)
- Elevation: 268 m (879 ft)

Population (2011)
  - Total: 1,086
  - Density: 551/km^{2} (1,430/sq mi)
- Time zone: UTC+1 (CET)
  - Summer (DST): UTC+2 (CEST)

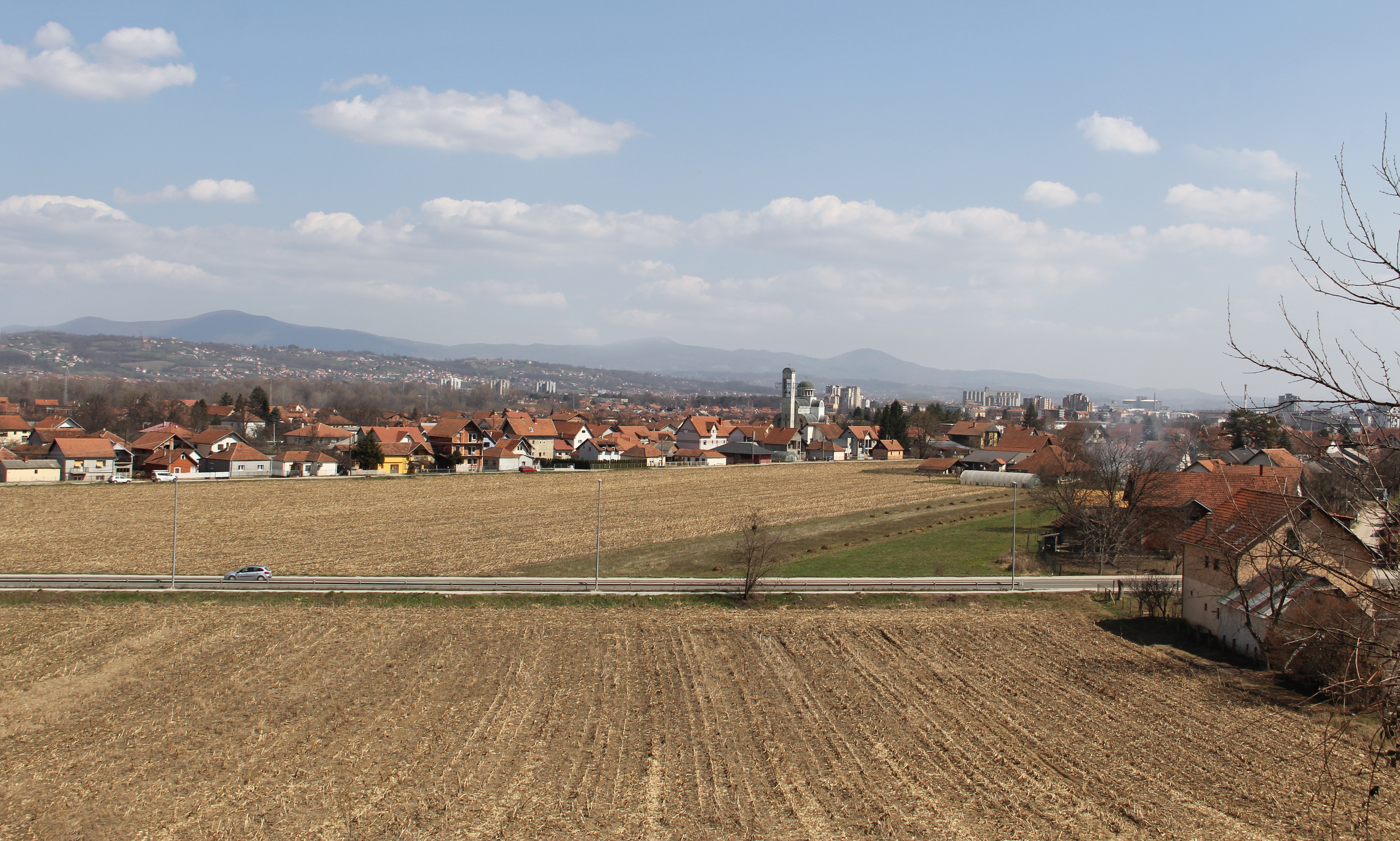
Village of Beljina (Cacak), Serbia.

Beljina (Serbian Cyrillic: Бељина) is a village in the municipality of Čačak, Serbia. According to the 2011 census, the village has a population of 1,086 people.
