= Loznica (Čačak) =

Loznica Лозница
- Village
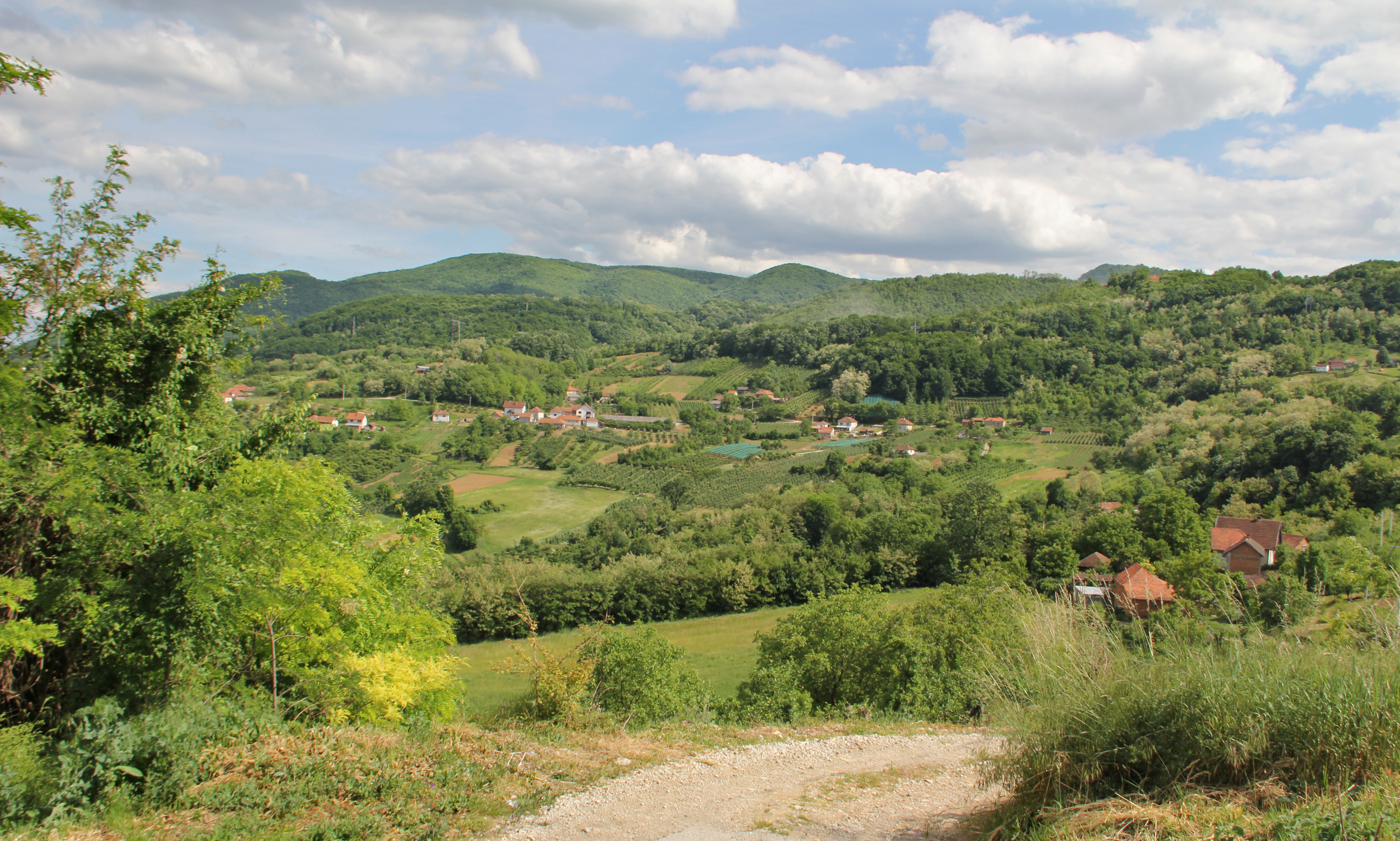
- Loznica

- Location within Serbia
- Coordinates: 43°52′00″N 20°19′53″E
- Country: Serbia
- District: Moravica District
- Municipality: Čačak

Area
  - Total: 5.99 km^{2} (2.31 sq mi)
- Elevation: 328 m (1,076 ft)

Population (2011)
  - Total: 432
  - Density: 72.1/km^{2} (187/sq mi)
- Time zone: UTC+1 (CET)
  - Summer (DST): UTC+2 (CEST)

Loznica (Serbian Cyrillic: Лозница) is a village in the municipality of Čačak, Serbia. According to the 2011 census, the village has a population of 432 people.
