= Kulinovci =

- Village
- Location within Serbia
- Coordinates: 43°52′04″N 20°22′08″E
- Country: Serbia
- District: Moravica District
- Municipality: Čačak

Area
  - Total: 1.54 km^{2} (0.59 sq mi)
- Elevation: 222 m (728 ft)

Population (2011)
  - Total: 344
  - Density: 223/km^{2} (579/sq mi)
- Time zone: UTC+1 (CET)
  - Summer (DST): UTC+2 (CEST)

Kulinovci (Serbian Cyrillic: Кулиновци) is a village in the municipality of Čačak, Serbia. According to the 2011 census, the village has a population of 344 people.
