= Milica Dačić =

Serbian politician

Milica Dačić (Serbian Cyrillic: Милица Дачић; born 11 November 1988) is a politician in Serbia. She has served as deputy mayor of Čačak and was elected to the National Assembly of Serbia in the 2020 parliamentary election.

== Early life and career ==
Dačić was born in Čačak, in what was then the Socialist Republic of Serbia in the Socialist Federal Republic of Yugoslavia. She was raised in the city and graduated from the University of Kragujevac Faculty of Law in 2012. Dačić worked as teaching associate in Kragujevac until 2015, when she returned to Čačak. She has published two volumes of poetry.

== Politician ==
=== Municipal ===
Dačić received the thirty-sixth position on the Progressive Party's electoral list in the 2016 Serbian local elections. The list won thirty-five out of seventy-five seats. While not initially elected, she received a mandate on 17 June 2016 as a replacement for another party member who had resigned. She served on the city's youth committee; the committee for the city statute, other regulations, and organization; the commission for allocating funds to associations; and the working team for establishing the free zone of Čačak. Dačić was named as the city's deputy mayor on 27 October 2017 and served in this role for the next three years. She did not seek re-election at the local level in 2020.

=== Member of the National Assembly ===
Dačić was given the 133rd position on the Progressive Party's list in the 2020 Serbian parliamentary election and was elected to the national assembly when the list won a landslide majority with 188 out of 250 mandates. She is now a member of the assembly committee on education, science, technological development, and the information society; a deputy member of the culture and information committee and the committee on the judiciary, public administration, and local self-government; a member of Serbia's delegation to the South-East European Cooperation Process parliamentary assembly; the leader of Serbia's parliamentary friendship group with Liechtenstein; and a member of the parliamentary friendship groups with Austria, Belgium, China, the Czech Republic, Denmark, France, Germany, Greece, Ireland, Israel, Italy, Malta, the Netherlands, Portugal, Russia, the United Kingdom, and the United States of America.
