= Dragačevo =

Geographical micro-region in Serbia

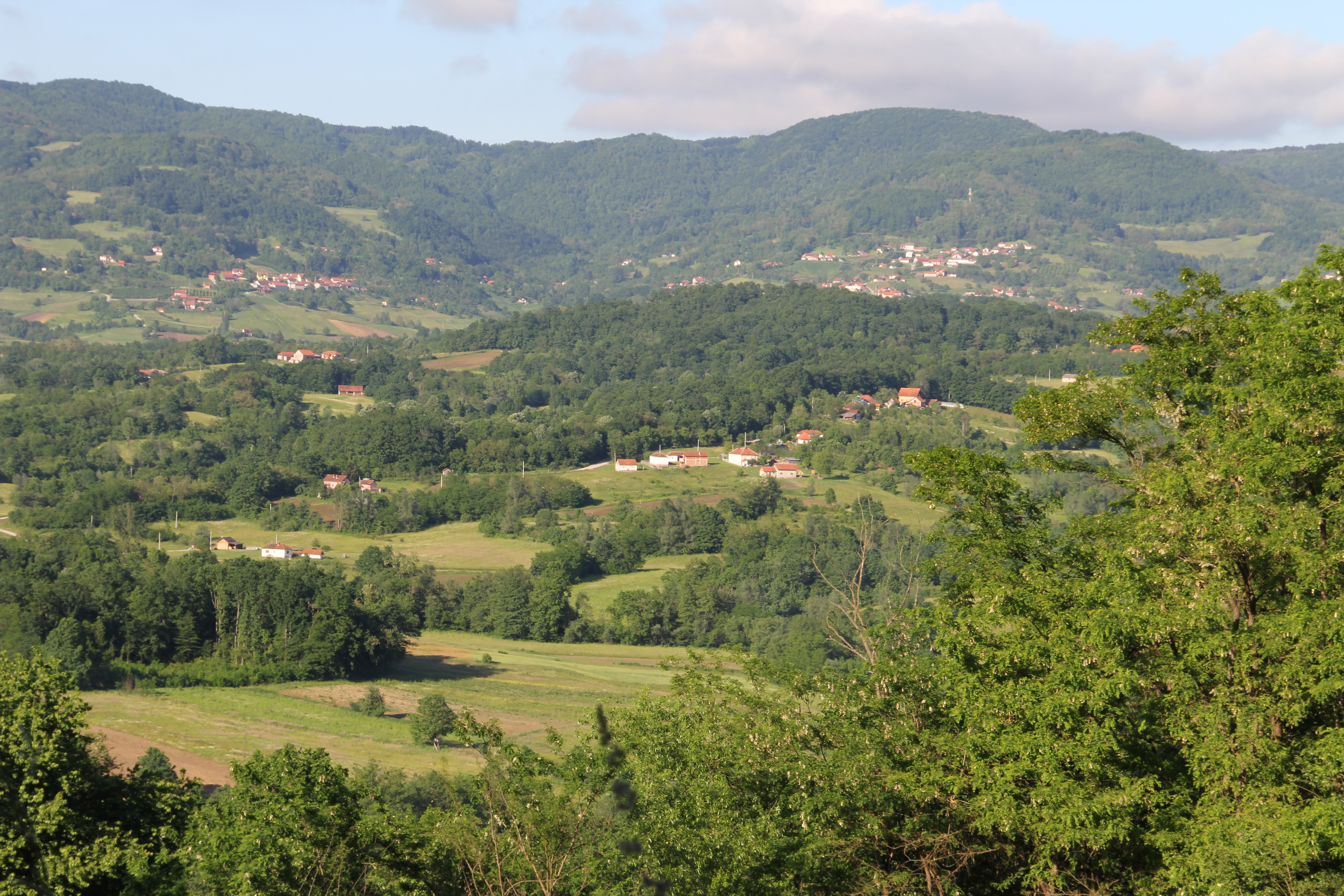
View of the village of Goračići

Dragačevo (Serbian: Драгачево) is a historical micro-region in central Serbia. It encomapsses mostly the area of Lučani municipality. It was a knežina (administrative unit) in Revolutionary Serbia and was then organized as a srez of the Požega okrug in the Principality of Serbia.

== History ==
During the First Serbian Uprising (1804–13), the Dragačevo area was organized into a knežina (administrative unit) of Revolutionary Serbia, belonging to the Požega nahiya. The Požega nahiya had included three knežina (Christian self-governing village groups) prior to 1804, the Dragačevo, Podibar and Čačanska Morava; with the uprising, Podibar and Čačanska Morava were united.

The villages of Dragačevo involved in the uprising were Virovo, Viča, Vlasteljice, Guča, Goračići, Guberevci, Grab, Gornji Dubac, Donja Kravarica, Donji Dubac, Zeoke, Kaona, Krstac, Lučani, Lis, Lisa, Lisice, Kotraža, Markovica, Dučalovići, Negrišori, Mirosaljci, Prilipac, Puhovo, Milatovići, Osonica, Rti-Krivača (now Rti and Krivača), Rogača, Rtari, Cerova, Trešnjevica, Tijanje, Brezovica.

Among the most notable participants in the Serbian Revolution that hailed from Dragačevo are:

- Milovan Nedeljković, later knez and kapetan of Dragačevo, from Virovo.
- Milutin Ilić (1739–1814), archpriest and vojvoda of Dragačevo, from Guča.
- Đoka Protić (1765–1815), vojvoda of Dragačevo, from Guča, Milutin's son.
- Novačić (d. 1813), hajduk harambaša and vojvoda of Dragačevo, from Goračići.
- Milić Radović (1775–1815), hajduk harambaša and vojvoda of Dragačevo, from Kaona.
- Simo Radović (1777–1845), commander, from Kaona, Milić's brother.
- Filip Tajsić (1786–1834), knez, from Puhovo.

During Hadži Prodan's rebellion (1814), Ottoman commander Ćor-Zuka and Serbian leader Miloš Obrenović suppressed the rebels in Dragačevo, captured Hadži Prodan's family and executed 60 Serbs. After the executions at Belgrade, Vizier Adem Pasha of Novi Pazar took his troops back to Novi Pazar via Dragačevo. Following the Takovo Meeting, which proclaimed the Second Serbian Uprising, vojvoda Lazar Mutap went to Dragačevo to collect rebels and then join with Jovan Obrenović in Čačak. After taking over Čačak, Miloš Obrenović sent Avram Lukić, the vojvoda and knez of Dragačevo, to support Radosav Jelečanin's siege of Karanovac.

== See also ==
- List of regions of Serbia

== Sources ==
- Đorđević, Tihomir R. (1921). "Кнежине у Србији за време прве владе Кнеза Милоша". Српски књижевни гласник, нова серија. 4: 508–518, 600–611.
- Marković, Života (1994). "Представници Рудничке и Пожешке (Чачанске) нахије у Правитељствујушчем совјету и скупштинама народних старешина од 1804. до 1813. године" [Représentants des nahies de Roudnik et de Pojéga (Tchatchak) au Conseil d'administration et aux assemblées des chefs du peuple entre les années 1804 et 1813]. Зборник радова Народног музеја у Чачку. XXIV: 61–82.
- Nenadović, Konstantin N. (1903) [1883]. Живот и дела великог Ђорђа Петровића Кара-Ђорђа [Life and Deeds of Great Đorđe Petrović Kara-Đorđe]. Vol. I (2 ed.). Belgrade: Штампа Савића и Комп. – via Archive.org.
- Pavlović, Dragoljub M. (1990). "Учесници српских үстанака од 1804. до 1815. године из Рудничке и Пожешке нахије" [Participants aux insurrections serbes de 1804 et 1815 nés dans les nahies de Rudnik et de Požega] (PDF). Зборник радова Народног музеја у Чачку. XX: 115–131.
- Protić, Kosta (1891). "Ратни догађаји из другог српског устанка, год. 1815". Годишњица Николе Чупића. XXXI. Državna štamparija: 1–104 – via Google Books.
