= Guča (meteorite) =

- Type: Stony meteorite
- Class: Stone-uncl; historically classified as a chondrite
- Country: Serbia
- Observed fall: Yes
- Fall date: 28 September 1891
- Found date: 28 September 1891
- Strewn field: no

Guča (Serbian: Гуча) is a stony meteorite that fell on 28 September 1891 (16 September 1891 according to the Julian calendar, which was used in Serbia until 1919) near Guča in the Dragačevo region of western Serbia. The fall was witnessed by several people. The recovered stone originally weighed slightly more than 1.9 kilograms.

Guča was one of three observed meteorite falls in Serbia during the 19th century, alongside Sokobanja (1877) and Jelica (1889). The meteorite later entered the collection of the Museum of the Serbian Land in Belgrade, but disappeared in early 1919 and has been considered lost ever since.

In the Meteoritical Bulletin Database, the meteorite is listed under the incorrect spelling Guêa as an unclassified stony meteorite (Stone-uncl). Contemporary Serbian sources, however, use the correct name Guča.

== Fall ==
The meteorite fell on 28 September 1891 at around 5 p.m. on the Osretak ridge near Guča. Four men working in a field witnessed the impact, including the landowner Jovan Bogdanović and three agricultural labourers . Sima Trojanović, a teacher and naturalist from the nearby town of Čačak was tasked to carry out initial investigations. In his report, he described the witnesses had heard intermittent booming, followed by rattling, howling and humming sounds. According to Trojanović's reconstruction, the meteorite travelled from north to south. It was surrounded by a black, opaque trail of smoke.

The landowner compared the first sound to thunder or a cannon shot. According to his testimony, the meteorite struck the field about 30 metres from him. It penetrated about 20 cm into the ground. The witnesses waited for five minutes before approaching the impact site, because they initially believed the black, burnt-looking object to be a shell or cannonball and feared that it might explode.

The sounds associated with the fall were heard within a radius of several kilometres around Guča. In his report, Trojanović mentions witness reports from Markovica, Negrišori, Mirosaljci and Jezdina. There were also reports of observations of the meteor from farther away. It was seen in the area of Arilje and Požega. The observations covered an area of approximately 900 km² around Guča.

== Recovery and investigation ==
School teacher Sima Trojanović was the first to report the fall by telegram on 23 September 1891 to the geologist Jovan Žujović at the Higher School in Belgrade. He reported that a meteorite weighing about two kilograms had fallen and was being held by the district authorities of Dragačevo. The following day, Trojanović travelled to Guča, examined the impact site, interviewed the eyewitnesses, had the meteorite sent to the Geological Institute of the Higher School in Belgrade, and submitted a detailed report to the Ministry of Education.

According to his report, only a single stone with a total mass of 1.922 kg had fallen. After its recovery, it had been damaged several times. One man had chipped off a piece out of curiosity in order to see what the stone looked like inside. This broken-off tip was recovered by Trojanović and weighed 7 grams. Another small piece had either broken off during the impact or during recovery and could not be found. The landowner and finder, Jovan Bogdanović, received a reward of 50 dinars from the Geological Institute so that he could buy an iron plough.

== Description ==
Trojanović described the meteorite as pyramidal in shape. The stone was about 10 cm high and its triangular base was approximately 11 cm wide. Its surface was covered by a black, unevenly developed fusion crust. Trojanović described crystalline portions of pyroxene and olivine, numerous yellowish shiny grains that he identified as troilite, as well as finely distributed iron grains. He compared Guča with the Jelica meteorite, which he had examined after it had fallen in 1889.

Contemporary catalogues classified Guča as a chondrite. Friedrich Berwerth listed it in 1903 in his catalogue of meteorites in the Imperial and Royal Natural History Court Museum under the name Guča and the synonym “Gutscha bei Cačak, Serbien”, with the contemporary classification “Ch”.

No chemical analysis was ever carried out. Since all known material from the meteorite has been missing since 1919, classification according to modern petrological and chemical standards is no longer possible. The Meteoritical Bulletin Database therefore lists it as Stone-uncl.

== First description ==
The first scientific description was published in 1893 under the title Gučki meteorit in the journal Geološki anali Balkanskoga poluostrva. Its author was the Serbian geologist and palaeontologist Petar S. Pavlović. Pavlović's paper contains telegrams exchanged immediately after the fall, Trojanović's report on his investigation in Guča, the recorded testimony of eyewitness Jovan Bogdanović and later correspondence.

== Disappearance ==
=== Evacuation from the museum ===
The meteorite entered the collection of the Museum of the Serbian Land (Muzej srpske zemlje), founded in 1895 and now the Natural History Museum in Belgrade. At the beginning of World War I in 1914, valuable objects from the museum were moved to safety. A crate containing the three Serbian meteorites Sokobanja, Jelica and Guča was evacuated from Belgrade to Niš together with other valuable material. It later reached Kraljevo, where it was buried in the courtyard of a private house.

=== Recovery and loss ===
After the war, the crate was dug up on 2 November 1918, and the three meteorites were taken to the military station in Kraljevo, where they were initially kept on a windowsill in the office of the station commander. When the office was moved at the end of January 1919, the stones were left behind. When they were later collected again, the Guča meteorite was missing, and a fragment weighing several kilograms had been broken off the Sokobanja meteorite. Official investigations into the disappearance of the meteorite began in July 1919 but produced no result.

== Incorrect spelling ==
The correct transliteration of the Serbian Cyrillic place name Гуча is Guča. This form is also found in contemporary Serbian sources. Petar Pavlović's first description of the meteorite from 1893 bears the title Gučki meteorit, literally “Meteorite of Guča”.

In the Meteoritical Bulletin Database, however, the meteorite is listed under the incorrect spelling Guêa. This error — with an ê (e with circumflex) instead of a č (c with caron) — can be traced back to 1897.

Excerpt from E. A. Wülfing's 1897 work Die Meteoriten in Sammlungen und ihre Literatur (p. 135), in which the Guča meteorite is first incorrectly referred to as “Guêa”.

Already in Ernst Anton Wülfing's 1897 work Die Meteoriten in Sammlungen und ihre Literatur, the meteorite is incorrectly listed as “Guěa, Serbien”.

Wülfing cites as his source the Viennese daily newspaper Neue Freie Presse of 14 October 1891, which reported the fall under the location wording “im Dorfe Gutscha bei Cacak” (“in the village of Gutscha near Cacak”) and described the meteorite as a “heart-shaped, blackish and fine-grained meteorite” weighing “1 kilo 922 grams”.

Citing E. A. Wülfing as its source, George T. Prior's 1923 Catalogue of Meteorites also adopted the erroneous spelling Guěa, which subsequently persisted in the international catalogue literature as Guêa up to the fifth edition of the Catalogue of Meteorites published in 2000.

From there, the erroneous designation Guêa entered the Meteoritical Bulletin Database, where the meteorite is also listed under the synonyms Cacak, Guc and Gutsch.
