= Kotraža =

Kotraža may refer to the following places in Serbia:

- Kotraža (Lučani)
- Kotraža (Stragari)
