= Dejan Lazarević =

Dejan Lazarević may refer to

- Dejan Lazarević (footballer born 1989), Serbian footballer for KF Apolonia Fier
- Dejan Lazarević (footballer) (born 1990), Slovenian footballer
- Dejan Lazarević (musician) (born before 2003), Serbian trumpeter
- Dejan Lazarević (singer) (born before 1994), Bosnian
