= Rogača =

Rogača (Serbian Cyrillic: Рогача) may refer to:

- Rogača (Lučani), Serbia
- Rogača (Sopot), Serbia
