= Zeoke =

Zeoke may refer to the following places in Serbia:

- Zeoke (Lazarevac), a village in the municipality of Lazarevac
- Zeoke (Lučani), a village in the municipality of Lučani
