= Vučkovica (Lučani) =

Vučkovica Вучковица
- Village
- Location within Serbia
- Coordinates: 43°41′N 20°15′E
- Country: Serbia
- District: Moravica District
- Municipality: Lučani

Area
  - Total: 14.78 km^{2} (5.71 sq mi)
- Elevation: 564 m (1,850 ft)

Population (2011)
  - Total: 326
  - Density: 22.1/km^{2} (57.1/sq mi)
- Time zone: UTC+1 (CET)
  - Summer (DST): UTC+2 (CEST)

Vučkovica is a village located in the municipality of Lučani, southwestern Serbia. According to the 2011 census, the village has a population of 326 inhabitants. There is an artificial lake Goli Kamen located in the village; it was built in 1990 and covers an area of 7.6 hectares.
