= Đerađ =

- Village
- Location within Serbia
- Coordinates: 43°50′57″N 20°07′36″E
- Country: Serbia
- District: Moravica District
- Municipality: Lučani

Population (2002)
  - Total: 76
- Time zone: UTC+1 (CET)
  - Summer (DST): UTC+2 (CEST)

Đerađ is a village in the municipality of Lučani, Serbia. According to the 2002 census, the village has a population of 76 people.
