= Živica (Lučani) =

Živica Живица
- Village
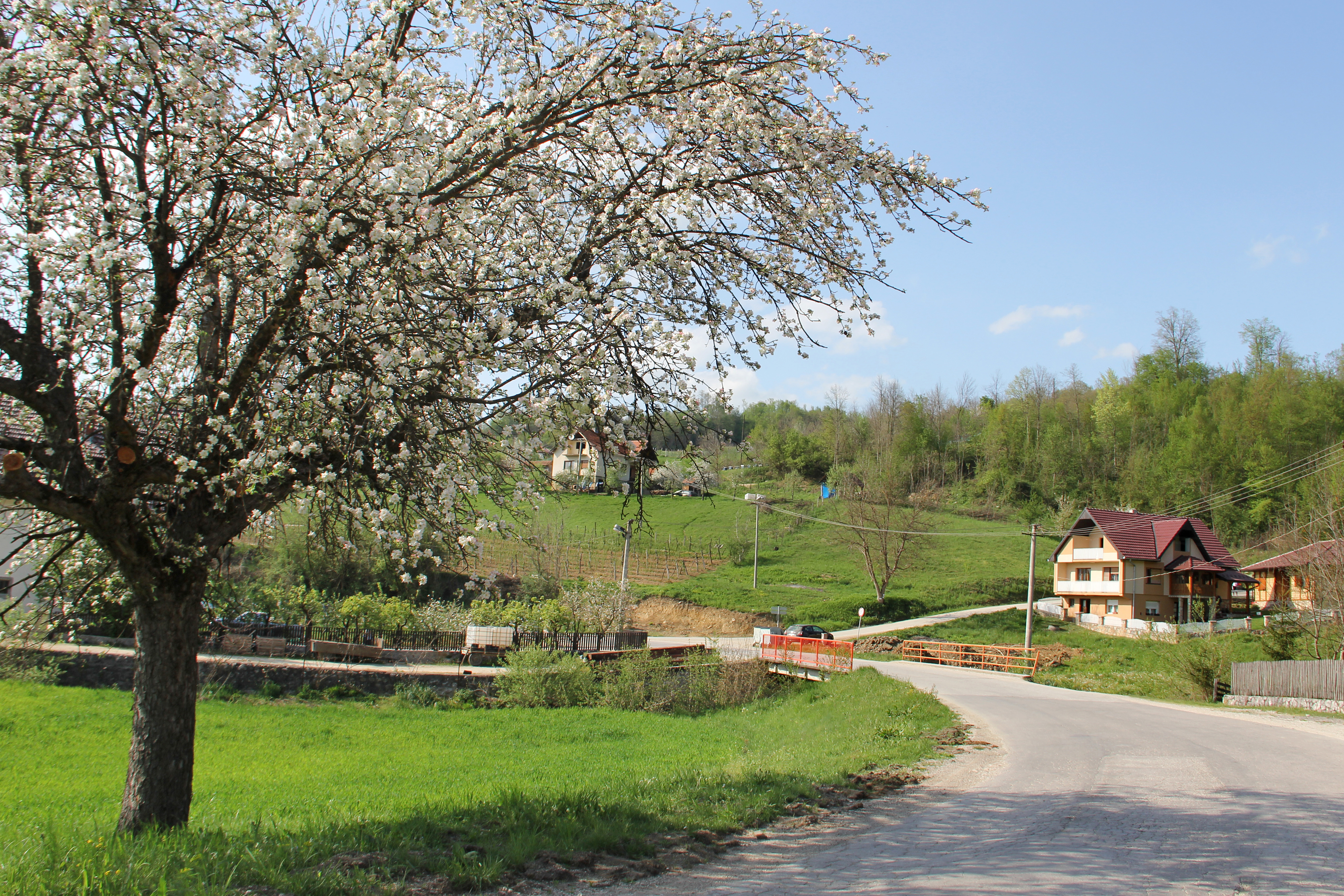
- Village of Zivica

- Location within Serbia
- Coordinates: 43°45′27″N 20°17′51″E
- Country: Serbia
- District: Moravica District
- Municipality: Lučani

Area
  - Total: 9.12 km^{2} (3.52 sq mi)
- Elevation: 475 m (1,558 ft)

Population (2011)
  - Total: 262
  - Density: 28.7/km^{2} (74.4/sq mi)
- Time zone: UTC+1 (CET)
  - Summer (DST): UTC+2 (CEST)

Živica is a village in the municipality of Lučani, Serbia. According to the 2011 census, the village has a population of 262 people.
