= Guča (selo) =

Coordinates: 43°46′11″N 20°14′12″E

Guča (selo) Гуча (село)
- Village
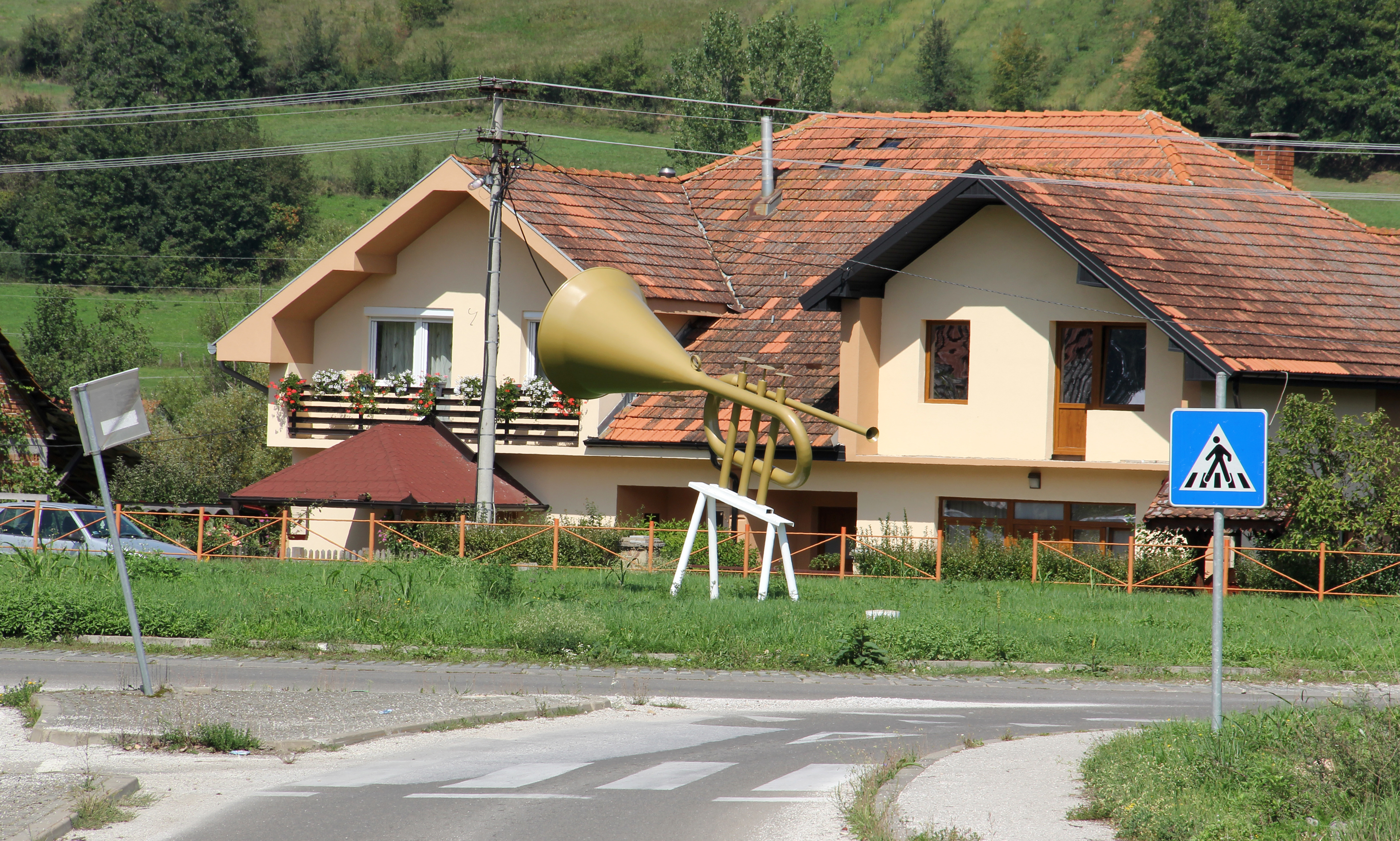
- Village of Guča, Serbia
- Interactive map of Guča (selo)
- Country: Serbia
- District: Moravica District
- Municipality: Lučani

Area
  - Total: 25.72 km^{2} (9.93 sq mi)

Population (2011)
  - Total: 1,955
  - Density: 76.01/km^{2} (196.9/sq mi)
- Time zone: UTC+1 (CET)
  - Summer (DST): UTC+2 (CEST)

Guča (selo) is a village in the municipality of Lučani, Serbia. According to the 2011 census, the village has a population of 1,955 people.
