= Gornja Kravarica =

- Village
- Location within Serbia
- Coordinates: 43°45′24″N 20°11′32″E
- Country: Serbia
- District: Moravica District
- Municipality: Lučani

Area
  - Total: 15.40 km^{2} (5.95 sq mi)
- Elevation: 503 m (1,650 ft)

Population (2011)
  - Total: 371
  - Density: 24.1/km^{2} (62.4/sq mi)
- Time zone: UTC+1 (CET)
  - Summer (DST): UTC+2 (CEST)

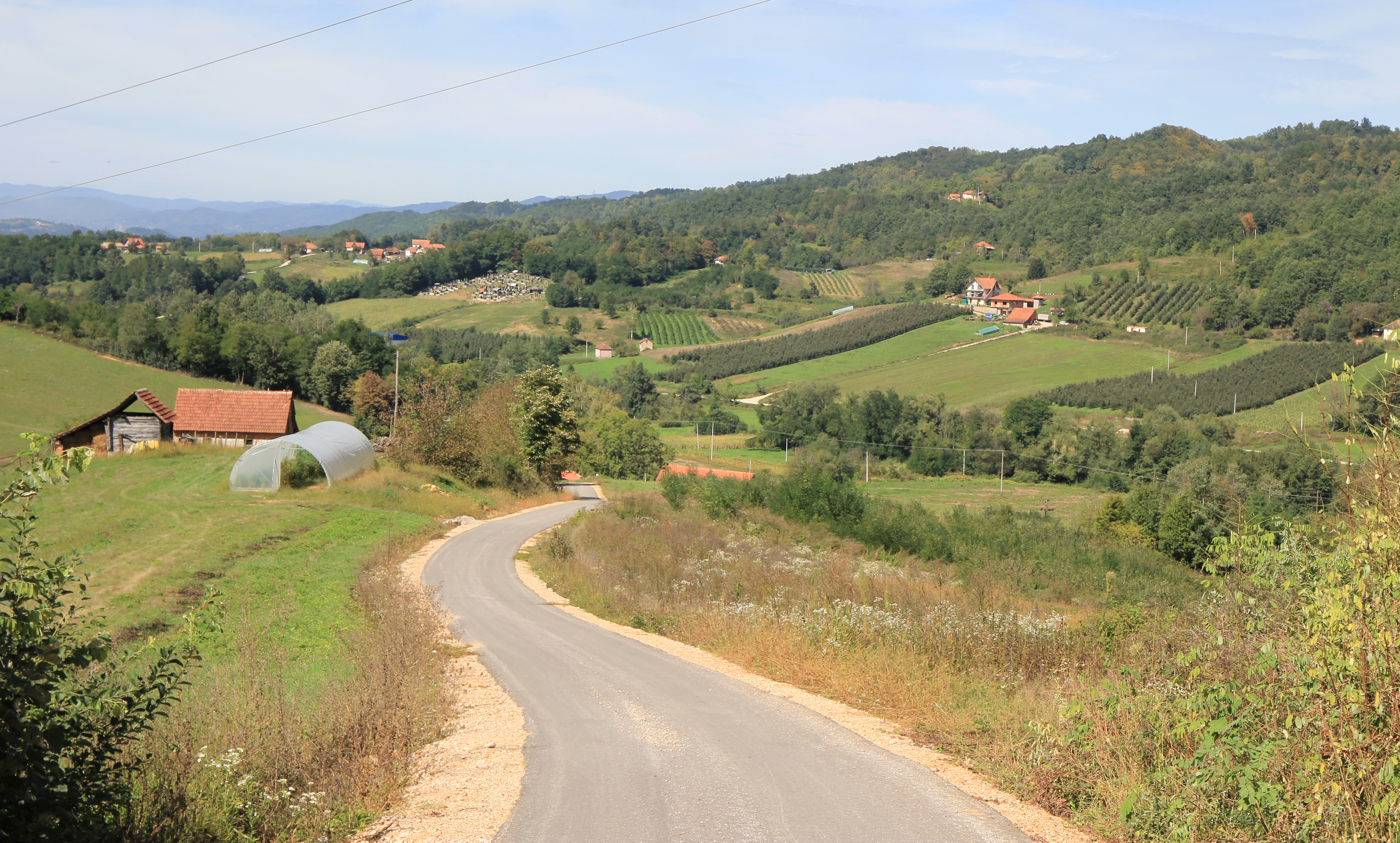

Gornja Kravarica is a village in the municipality of Lučani, Serbia. According to the 2011 census the village had a population of 371 people.
