= Dejan Lazarević (musician) =

- Birth name: Dejan Lazarević
- Origin: Požega, Serbia
- Genres: Folk
- Occupation: musician

Dejan Lazarević is a trumpet player from Požega, Serbia.

== Career ==
He has been winning prizes in Guča already for many years in a row. He won his first prize one year after the orchestra was formed. In 2003 Dejan won at the Trumpeters Festival in Guča the Golden Trumpet the prize of the audience. After this, awards were following year after year: First Trumpet in 2005, Golden Trumpet in 2007. The next year, in 2008, he again won the Golden Trumpet thanks to votes from the audience, but also the First Trumpet which is awarded by the experts' jury. Lazarević thus became the first trumpeter in the history of Guča to become the first double winner, and that same year he was also pronounced the Master of Trumpet. With his orchestra Dejan won also the contest of Balkan brass orchestras in Zaječar, where he was pronounced also the King of Balkan Trumpet!

This artist beloved by the audience considers the year 2009 to be the most successful one in his career. The interpretation of Serbian national music and the way in which the trumpet is played made Dejan Lazarević orchestra famous also beyond Serbia's borders. Some of the most successful performances were those in Italy, France, Russia, Belgium, Austria and Germany.
