= Pšanik =

- Village
- Location within Serbia
- Coordinates: 43°43′N 20°15′E
- Country: Serbia
- District: Moravica District
- Municipality: Lučani

Area
  - Total: 6.49 km^{2} (2.51 sq mi)
- Elevation: 431 m (1,414 ft)

Population (2011)
  - Total: 179
  - Density: 27.6/km^{2} (71.4/sq mi)
- Time zone: UTC+1 (CET)
  - Summer (DST): UTC+2 (CEST)

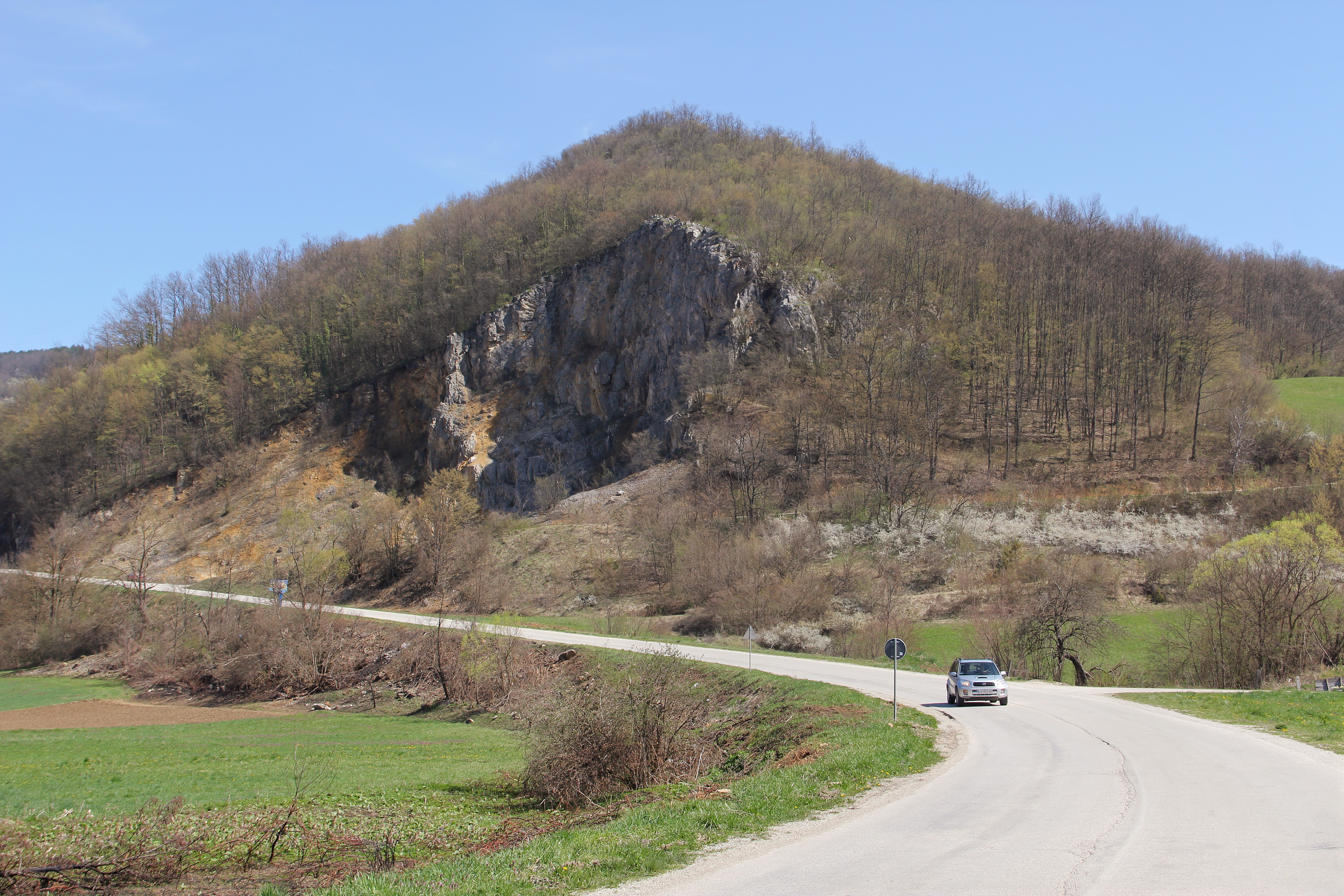
Pšanik

Pšanik is a village in the municipality of Lučani, Serbia. According to the 2011 census, the village has a population of 179 people.
