= Turica =

Coordinates: 43°48′N 20°12′E

- Village
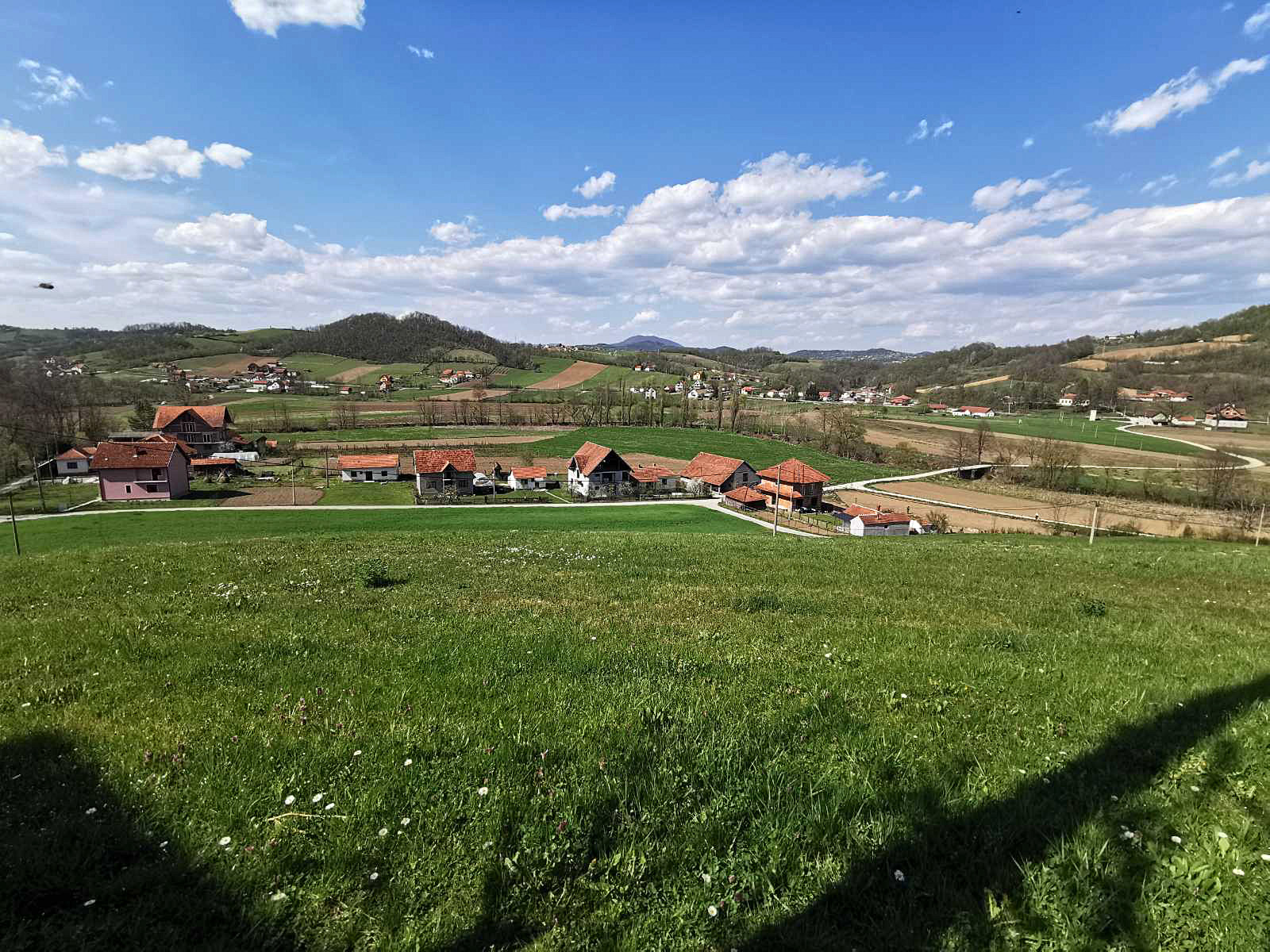
- Interactive map of Turica
- Country: Serbia
- District: Moravica District
- Municipality: Lučani

Area
  - Total: 11.17 km^{2} (4.31 sq mi)
- Elevation: 378 m (1,240 ft)

Population (2011)
  - Total: 530
  - Density: 47/km^{2} (120/sq mi)
- Time zone: UTC+1 (CET)
  - Summer (DST): UTC+2 (CEST)

Turica is a village in the municipality of Lučani, Serbia. According to the 2011 census, the village has a population of 530 people.
