= Beli Kamen, Lučani =

Beli Kamen Бели Камен
- Village
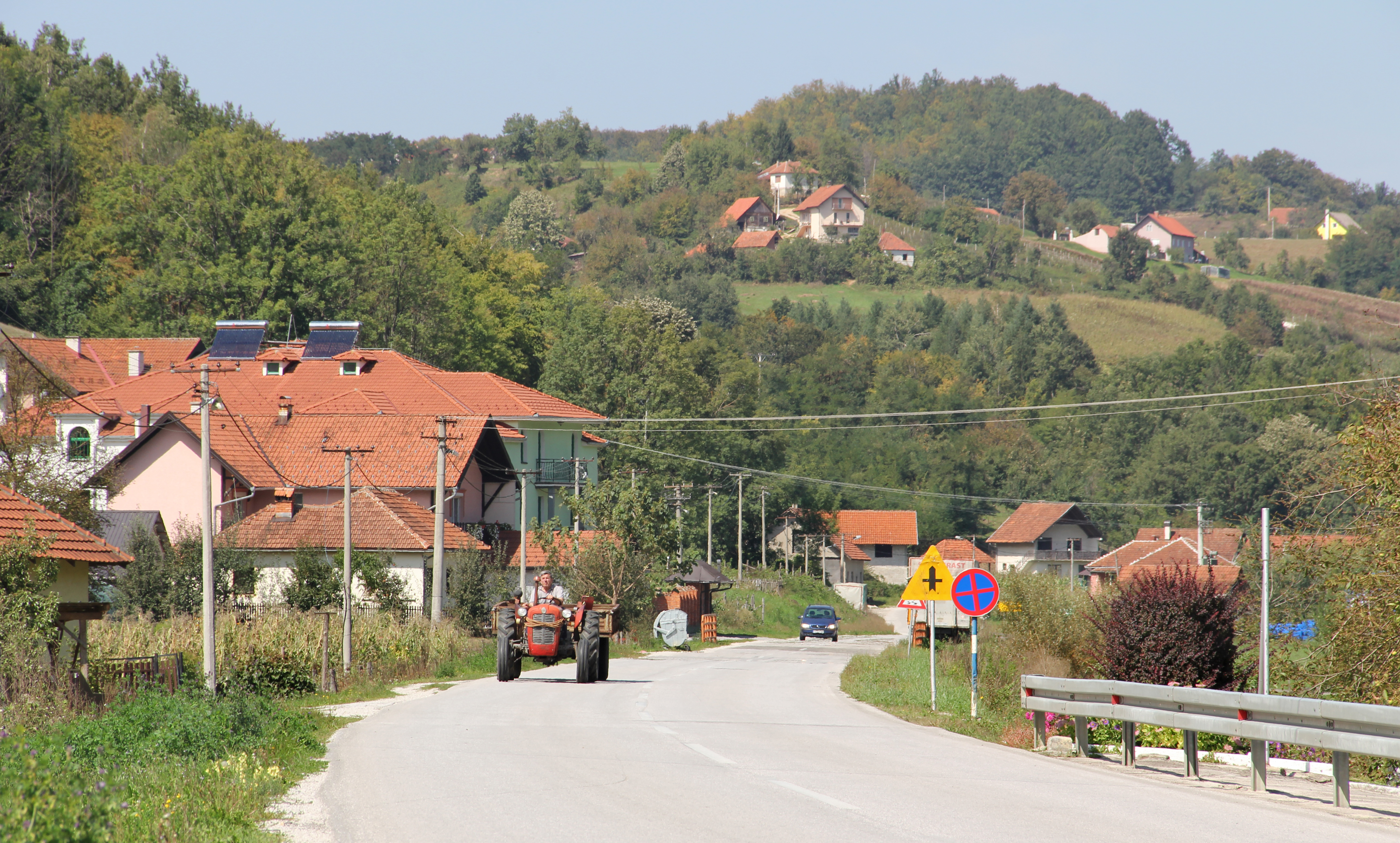

- Location within Serbia
- Coordinates: 43°41′21″N 20°12′52″E
- Country: Serbia
- District: Moravica District
- Municipality: Lučani

Area
  - Total: 12.08 km^{2} (4.66 sq mi)
- Elevation: 920 m (3,020 ft)

Population (2011)
  - Total: 466
  - Density: 38.6/km^{2} (99.9/sq mi)
- Time zone: UTC+1 (CET)
  - Summer (DST): UTC+2 (CEST)

Beli Kamen is a village in the municipality of Lučani, Serbia. According to the 2011 census, the village has a population of 466 people.
