= Grab, Lučani =

Grab Граб
- Village
- Location within Serbia
- Coordinates: 43°49′N 20°16′E
- Country: Serbia
- District: Moravica District
- Municipality: Lučani

Area
  - Total: 12.08 km^{2} (4.66 sq mi)
- Elevation: 488 m (1,601 ft)

Population (2011)
  - Total: 242
  - Density: 20.0/km^{2} (51.9/sq mi)
- Time zone: UTC+1 (CET)
  - Summer (DST): UTC+2 (CEST)

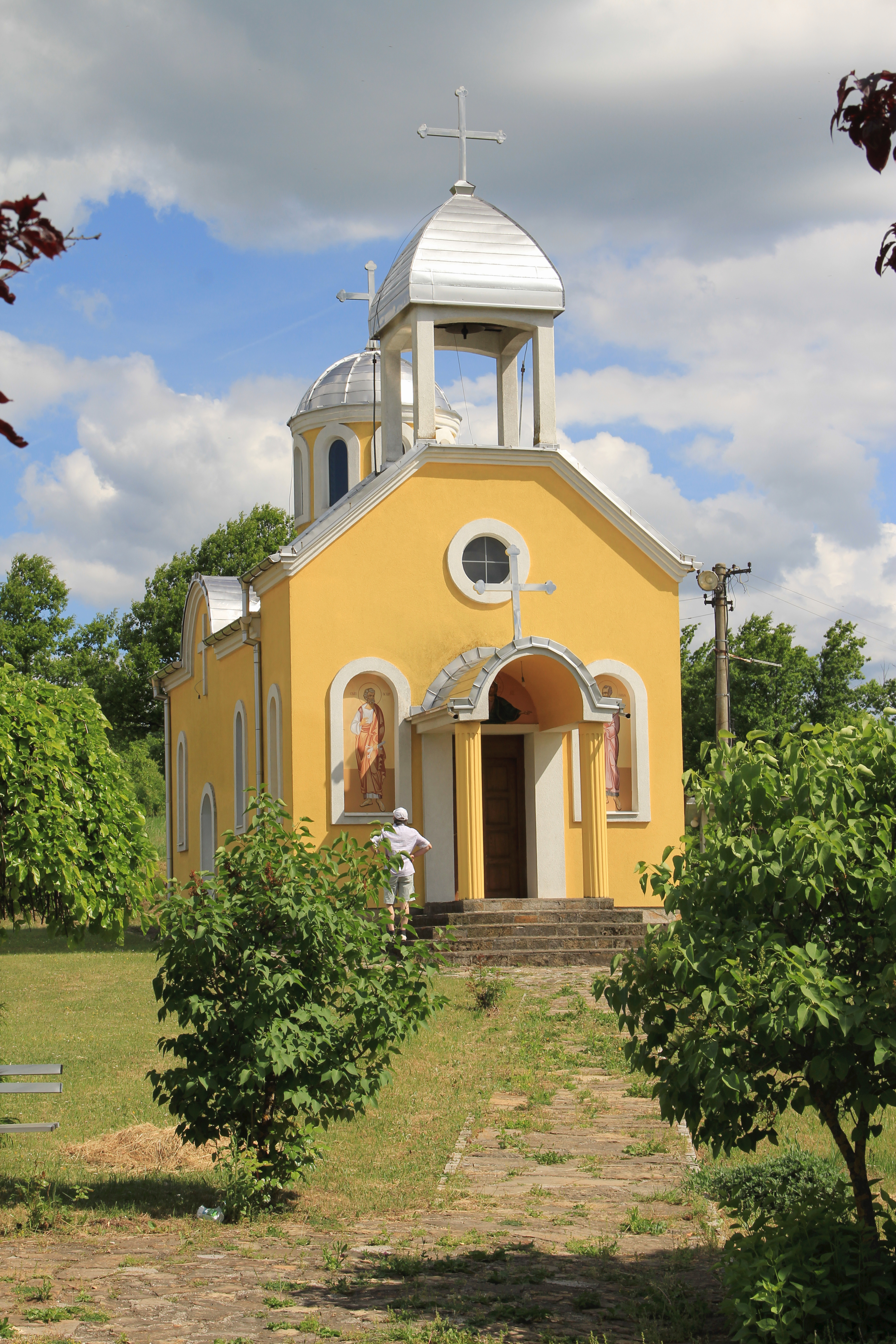
Church of the Holy Apostles Peter and Paul in the village of Grab, Lučani, Serbia.

Grab is a village in the municipality of Lučani, Serbia. According to the 2011 census, the village has a population of 242 people.
