= Lučani =

Lučani Лучани (Serbian)
- Town and municipality
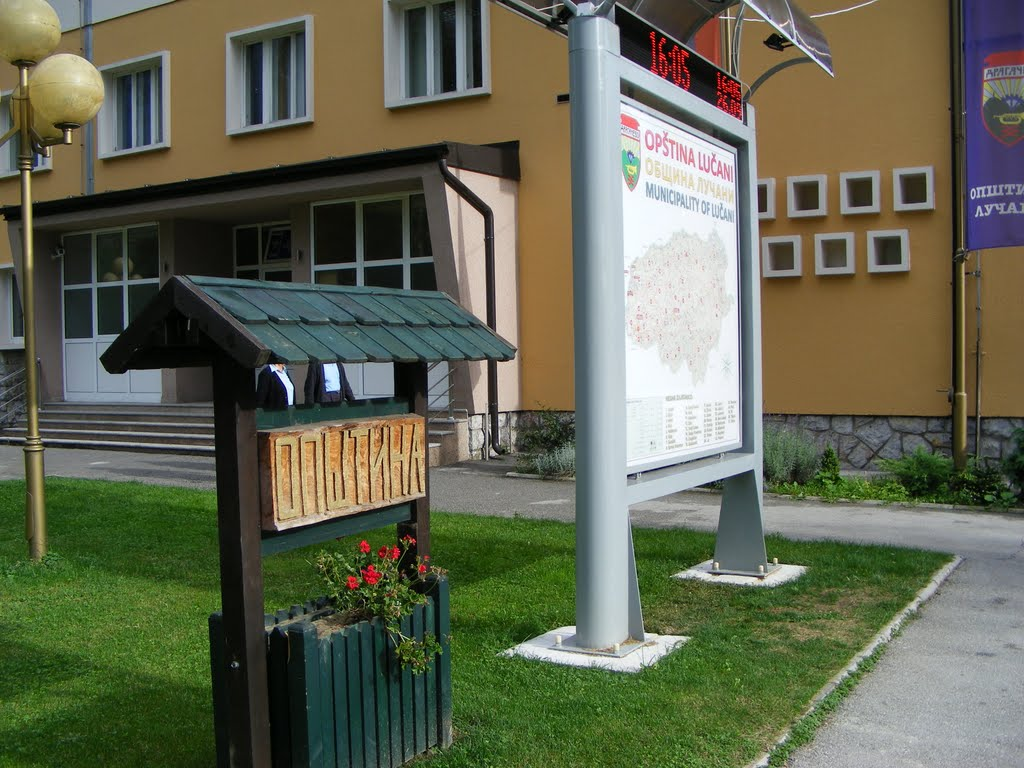
- Town Hall Entrance

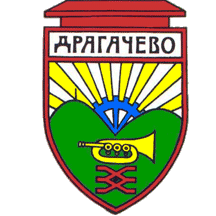
- Coat of arms

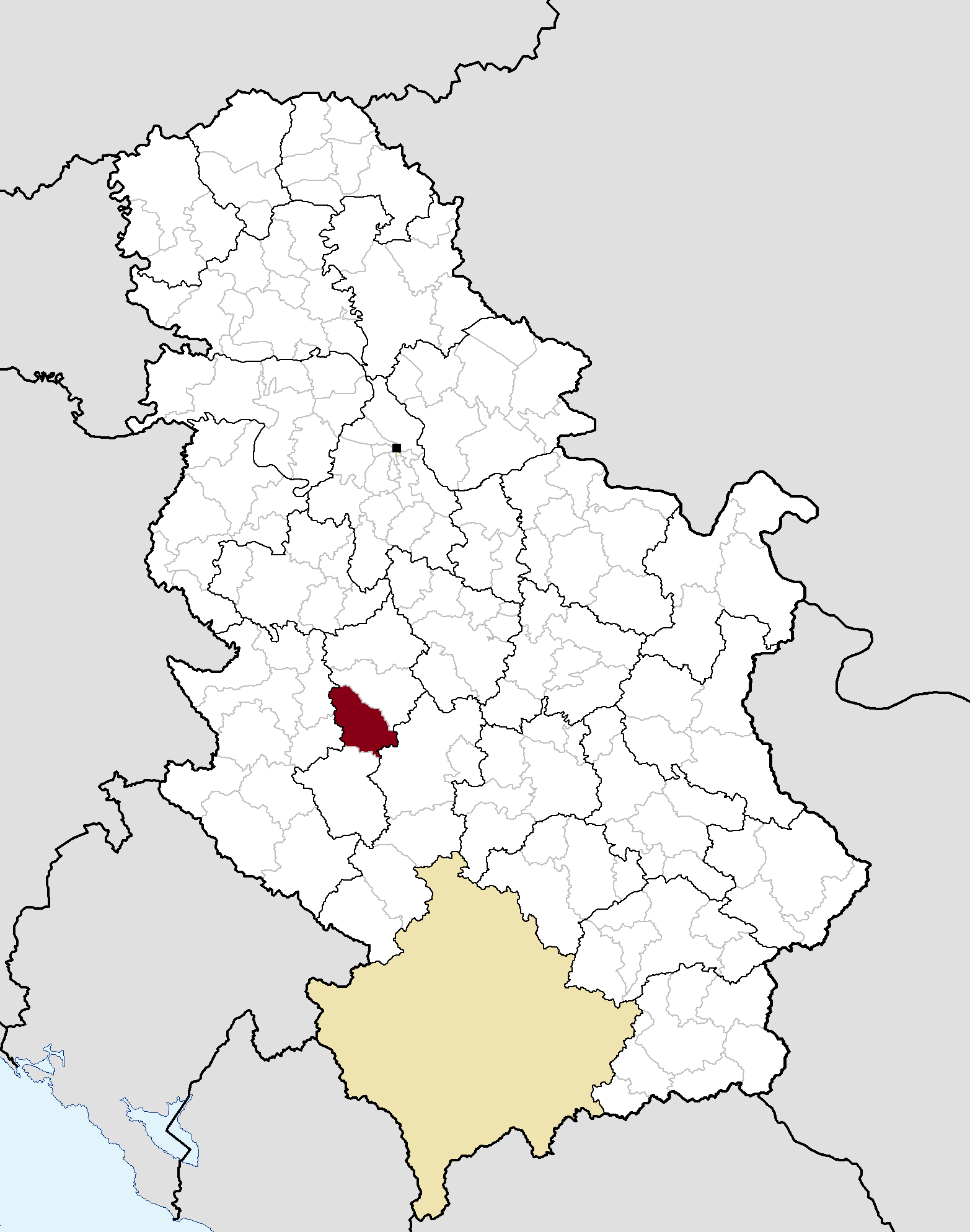
- Location of the municipality of Lučani within Serbia
- Coordinates: 43°52′N 20°08′E
- Country: Serbia
- Region: Šumadija and Western Serbia
- District: Moravica
- Settlements: 36

Government
  - Mayor: Milivoje Dolović (SNS)

Area
  - Rank: 74th in Serbia
  - Town: 1.99 km^{2} (0.77 sq mi)
  - Municipality: 454.76 km^{2} (175.58 sq mi)
- Elevation: 308 m (1,010 ft)
- Highest elevation: 420 m (1,380 ft)
- Lowest elevation: 293 m (961 ft)

Population (2022 census)
  - Rank: 77th in Serbia
  - Town: 2,921
  - Town density: 1,470/km^{2} (3,800/sq mi)
  - Municipality: 16,933
  - Municipality density: 37.235/km^{2} (96.438/sq mi)
- Time zone: UTC+1 (CET)
  - Summer (DST): UTC+2 (CEST)
- Postal code: 32240
- Area code: +381(0)32
- Car plates: LU
- Website: www.lucani.rs

Lučani (Serbian Cyrillic: Лучани) is a town and municipality located in the Moravica District of western Serbia. The population of the town is 2,921, while the population of the municipality is 16,933 (2022 census).

== Settlements ==
Aside from the town of Lučani, the municipality includes the following settlements:

- Beli Kamen
- Viča
- Vlasteljice
- Vučkovica
- Goračići
- Gornja Kravarica
- Gornji Dubac
- Grab
- Guberevci
- Guča
- Guča village
- Dljin
- Donja Kravarica
- Donji Dubac
- Dučalovići
- Đerađ
- Živica
- Zeoke
- Kaona
- Kotraža
- Krivača
- Krstac
- Lis
- Lisice
- Lučani village
- Markovica
- Milatovići
- Negrišori
- Puhovo
- Pšanik
- Rogača
- Rtari
- Rti
- Tijanje
- Turica

== Demographics ==
Historical population
Year	Pop.	±% p.a.
1948	32,333	—
1953	34,412	+1.25%
1961	33,336	−0.40%
1971	31,646	−0.52%
1981	29,708	−0.63%
1991	27,167	−0.89%
2002	24,614	−0.89%
2011	20,897	−1.80%
2022	16,933	−1.89%

In the town of Lučani there are 5,142 inhabitants, while the average age of the population is 38,3 years (37,8 with men and 38,7 with women). There are 7,298 homes in the municipality and the average number of people living together is 2,86.

=== Ethnic groups ===
The municipality is largely inhabited by Serbs (97.9%).

Graph showing the Lučani population change in the 20th century

Lučani ethnicities in 2011
Serbs	98.00%
Montenegrins	0.78%
Yugoslavs	0.13%
Croats	0.11%
Macedonians	0.06%
Hungarians	0.04%
Slovaks	0.02%
Other	0.62%

== Economy ==
Lučani is home to the chemical defence company Milan Blagojević - Namenska which employs around 1,300 people (as of 2017). Also, Maxima color manufacturer has its factory in Lučani.

The following table gives a preview of total number of registered people employed in legal entities per their core activity (as of 2022):

Activity	Total
Agriculture, forestry and fishing	31
Mining and quarrying	6
Manufacturing	2,541
Electricity, gas, steam and air conditioning supply	191
Water supply; sewerage, waste management and remediation activities	58
Construction	155
Wholesale and retail trade, repair of motor vehicles and motorcycles	329
Transportation and storage	250
Accommodation and food services	154
Information and communication	7
Financial and insurance activities	26
Real estate activities	1
Professional, scientific and technical activities	92
Administrative and support service activities	34
Public administration and defense; compulsory social security	162
Education	278
Human health and social work activities	197
Arts, entertainment and recreation	83
Other service activities	61
Individual agricultural workers	239
Total	4,896

== Culture ==
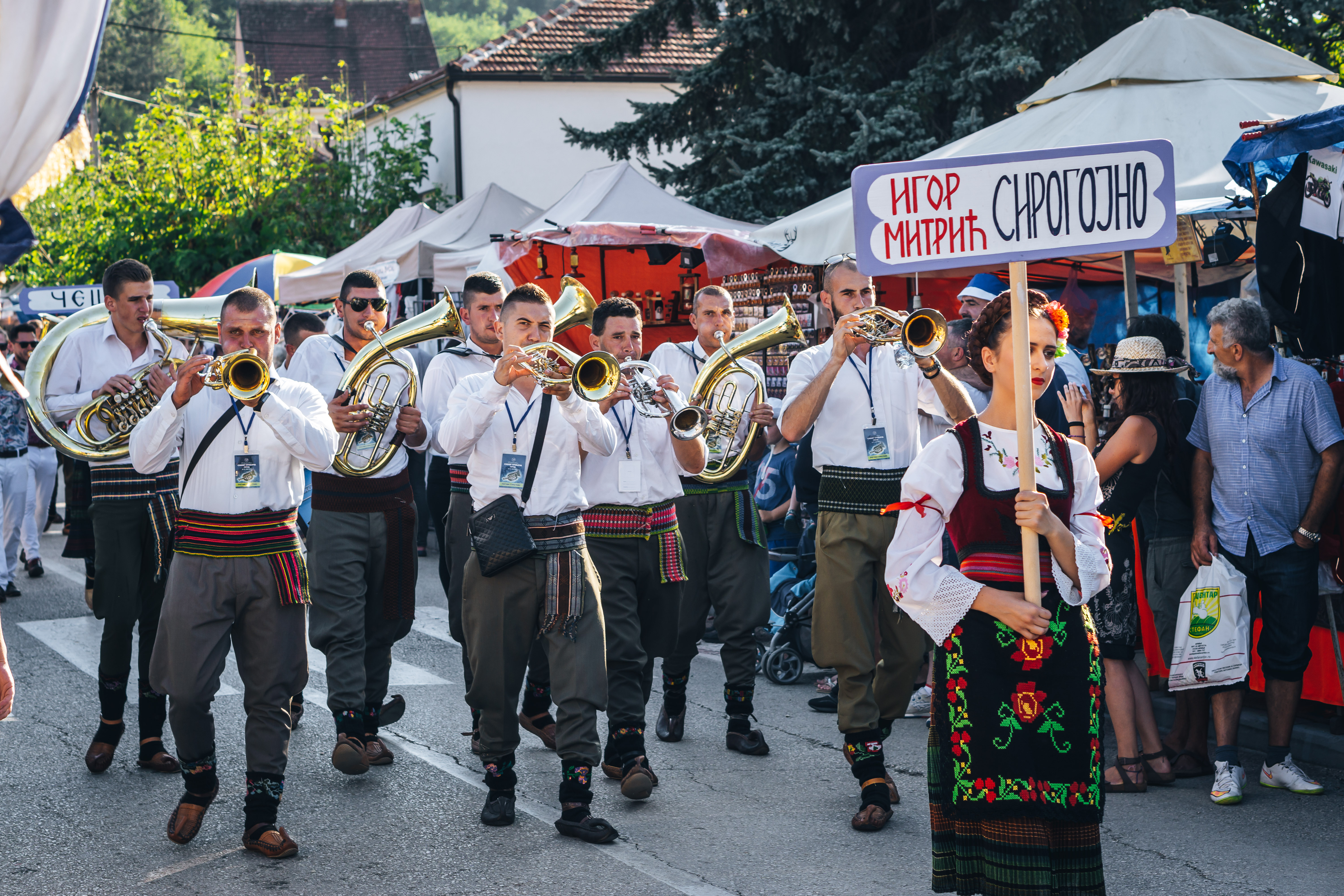
Guča trumpet festival

Guča trumpet festival, also known as the Dragačevo Assembly, in the town of Guča in Lučani municipality is a major cultural event in this area. Dating back from 1961, the festival brings more than 300,000 visitors and 1,000 performers every year, both from Serbia and abroad.

== Sports ==
Lučani is home to the professional football club FK Mladost Lučani, which has played continuously in the Serbian SuperLiga, the top division of Serbian football.

== Notable people ==
- Radmila Bakočević (b. 1933), opera singer
- Ratko Dostanić (b. 1959), football coach
- Boban Janković (1963–2006), basketball player
- Željko Tanasković (b. 1967), volleyball player
- Radojica Vasić (b. 1976), football player
- MC Stojan (b. 1983), singer
- Milan Bojović (b. 1987), football player

== See also ==
- Guča trumpet festival
