= Viča, Lučani =

Coordinates: 43.7250°N 20.3019°E

Viča
- Village
- Interactive map of Viča
- Country: Serbia
- District: Moravica District
- Municipality: Lučani

Area
  - Total: 34.22 km^{2} (13.21 sq mi)
- Elevation: 408 m (1,339 ft)

Population (2011)
  - Total: 971
  - Density: 28.4/km^{2} (73.5/sq mi)
- Time zone: UTC+1 (CET)
  - Summer (DST): UTC+2 (CEST)

Viča is a village in the municipality of Lučani, Serbia. According to the 2011 census, the village has a population of 971 people.
