= Rti (Lučani) =

Coordinates: 43.7361°N 20.2489°E

- Village
- Interactive map of Rti
- Country: Serbia
- District: Moravica District
- Municipality: Lučani

Area
  - Total: 12.43 km^{2} (4.80 sq mi)
- Elevation: 521 m (1,709 ft)

Population (2011)
  - Total: 490
  - Density: 39/km^{2} (100/sq mi)
- Time zone: UTC+1 (CET)
  - Summer (DST): UTC+2 (CEST)

Rti is a village in the municipality of Lučani, Serbia. According to the 2011 census, the village has a population of 490 people.
