= Guberevci =

- Village
- Location within Serbia
- Coordinates: 43°45′N 20°21′E
- Country: Serbia
- District: Moravica District
- Municipality: Lučani

Area
  - Total: 21.73 km^{2} (8.39 sq mi)
- Elevation: 453 m (1,486 ft)

Population (2011)
  - Total: 610
  - Density: 28/km^{2} (73/sq mi)
- Time zone: UTC+1 (CET)
  - Summer (DST): UTC+2 (CEST)

Guberevci is a village in the municipality of Lučani, Serbia. According to the 2011 census, the village has a population of 610 people.
