= Krstac (Lučani) =

Krstac Крстац
- Village
- Location within Serbia
- Coordinates: 43°50′20″N 20°08′49″E
- Country: Serbia
- District: Moravica District
- Municipality: Lučani

Area
  - Total: 6.57 km^{2} (2.54 sq mi)
- Elevation: 350 m (1,150 ft)

Population (2011)
  - Total: 522
  - Density: 79.5/km^{2} (206/sq mi)
- Time zone: UTC+1 (CET)
  - Summer (DST): UTC+2 (CEST)

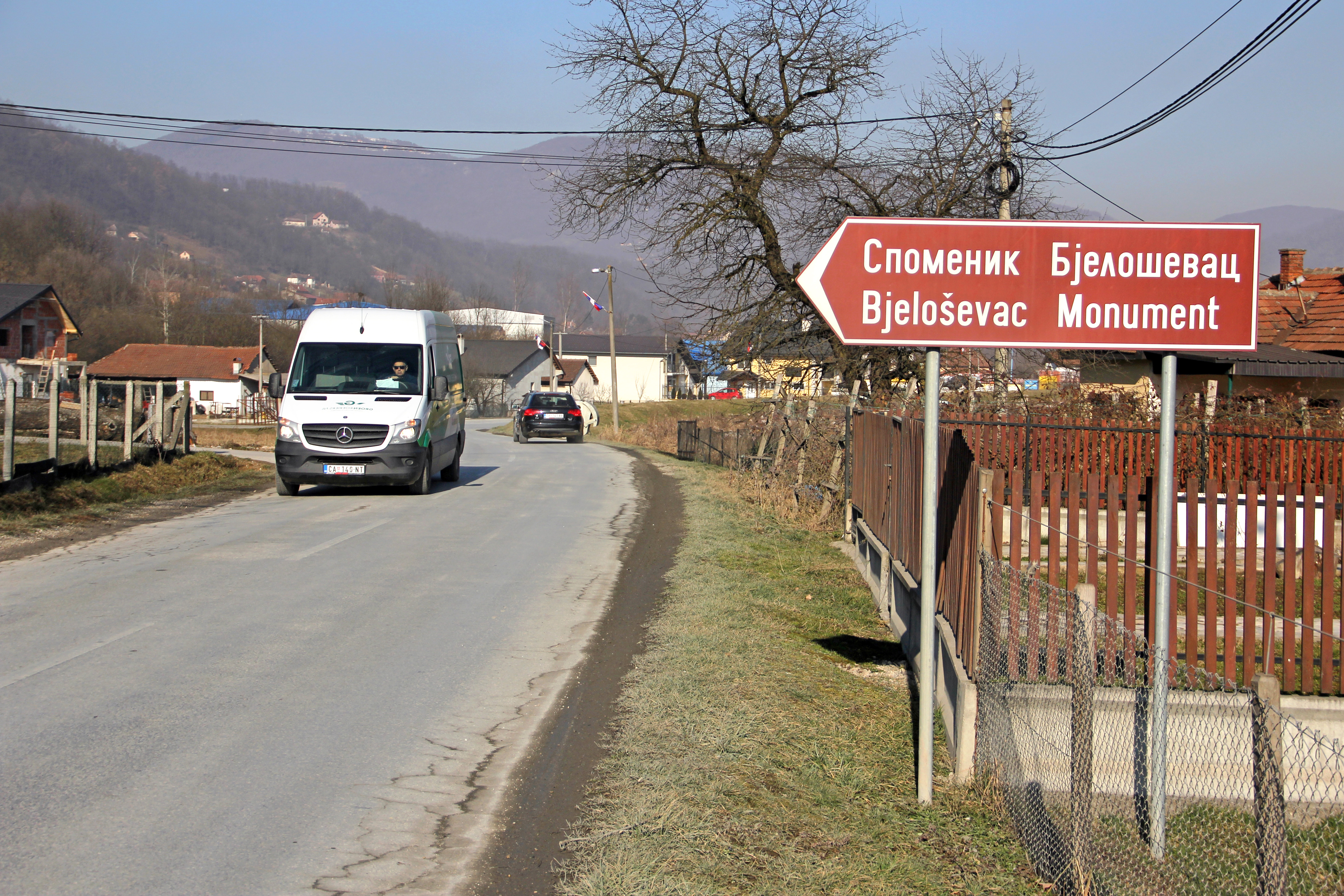
Krstac village (Lucani Municipality), Serbia.

Krstac is a village in the municipality of Lučani, Serbia. According to the 2011 census, the village has a population of 522 people.
