= Kotraža, Kragujevac =

Kotraža Котража (Serbian)
- Village
- Location within Serbia
- Coordinates: 44°09′18″N 20°41′10″E
- Country: Serbia
- District: Šumadija District
- City: Kragujevac

Population (2011)
  - Total: 185
- Time zone: UTC+1 (CET)
  - Summer (DST): UTC+2 (CEST)

Kotraža (Serbian: Котража) is a village in the Kragujevac city area in the Šumadija District, Serbia. According to the 2011 census there were 185 inhabitants.
