= Milatovići =

- Village
- Location within Serbia
- Coordinates: 43°43′09″N 20°21′22″E
- Country: Serbia
- District: Moravica District
- Municipality: Lučani

Area
  - Total: 17.12 km^{2} (6.61 sq mi)
- Elevation: 460 m (1,510 ft)

Population (2011)
  - Total: 625
  - Density: 36.5/km^{2} (94.6/sq mi)
- Time zone: UTC+1 (CET)
  - Summer (DST): UTC+2 (CEST)

Milatovići is a village in the municipality of Lučani, Serbia. According to the 2011 census, the village has a population of 625 people.
