= Lis, Lučani =

Lis
- Village
- Location within Serbia
- Coordinates: 43°48′14″N 20°10′41″E
- Country: Serbia
- District: Moravica District
- Municipality: Lučani

Area
  - Total: 6.32 km^{2} (2.44 sq mi)
- Elevation: 584 m (1,916 ft)

Population (2011)
  - Total: 211
  - Density: 33.4/km^{2} (86.5/sq mi)
- Time zone: UTC+1 (CET)
  - Summer (DST): UTC+2 (CEST)

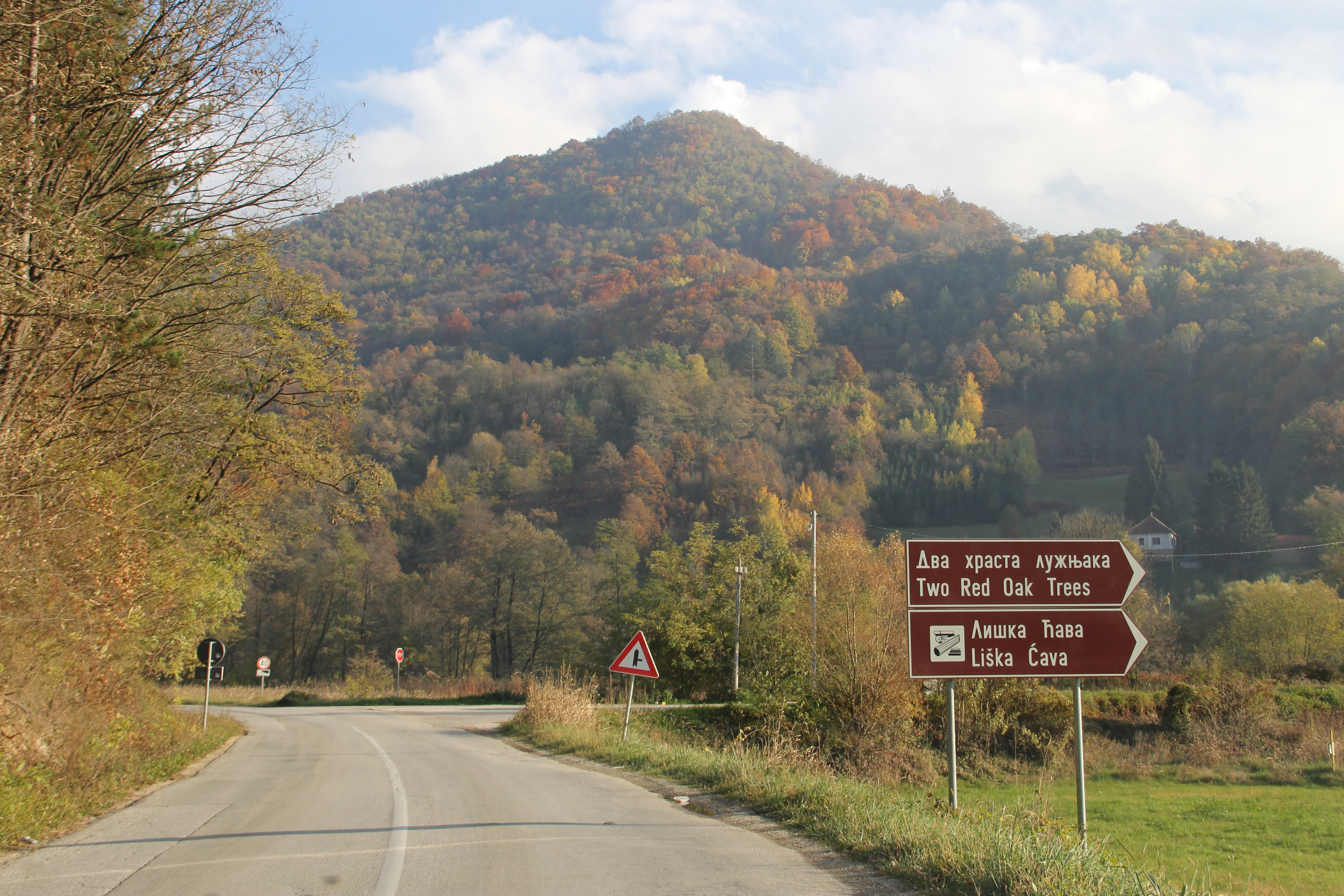
Signpost to the Dragacevo village of Lis

Lis is a village in the municipality of Lučani, Serbia. According to the 2011 census, the village has a population of 211 people.
