= Vlasteljice =

- Village
- Location within Serbia
- Coordinates: 43°43′17″N 20°24′08″E
- Country: Serbia
- District: Moravica District
- Municipality: Lučani

Area
  - Total: 8.52 km^{2} (3.29 sq mi)
- Elevation: 704 m (2,310 ft)

Population (2011)
  - Total: 279
  - Density: 32.7/km^{2} (84.8/sq mi)
- Time zone: UTC+1 (CET)
  - Summer (DST): UTC+2 (CEST)

Vlasteljice is a village in the municipality of Lučani, Serbia. According to the 2011 census, the village has a population of 279 people.
