= Jezdina =

- Village
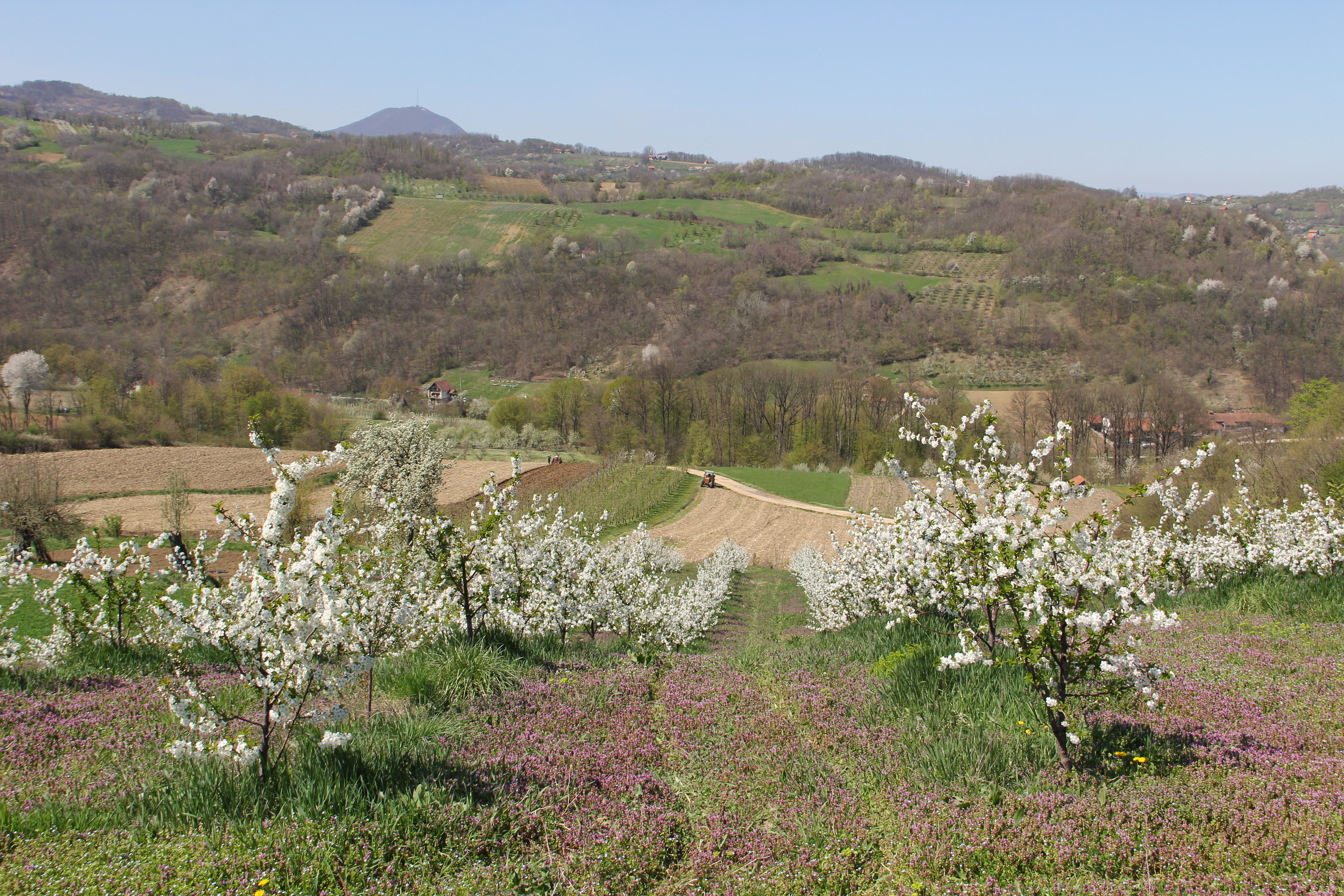
- Village of Jezdina in Čačak, Serbia

- Location within Serbia
- Coordinates: 43°52′15″N 20°18′59″E
- Country: Serbia
- District: Moravica District
- Municipality: Čačak

Area
  - Total: 5.29 km^{2} (2.04 sq mi)
- Elevation: 321 m (1,053 ft)

Population (2011)
  - Total: 246
  - Density: 46.5/km^{2} (120/sq mi)
- Time zone: UTC+1 (CET)
  - Summer (DST): UTC+2 (CEST)

Jezdina (Serbian Cyrillic: Јездина) is a village in the municipality of Čačak, Serbia. According to the 2011 census, the village has a population of 246 people.
