= Osonica =

- Village
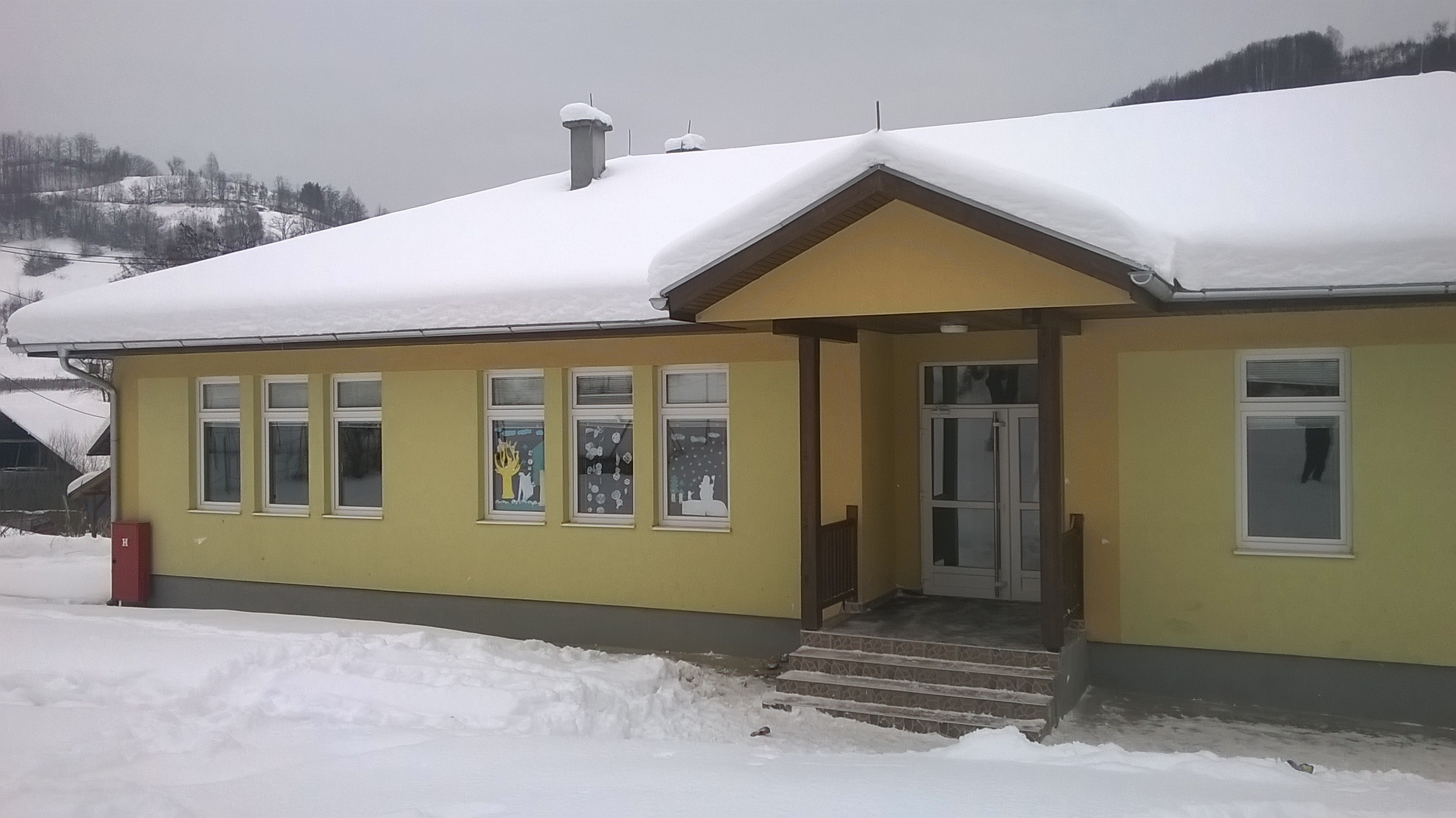
- School in Osonica

- Location within Serbia
- Coordinates: 43°35′29″N 20°20′19″E
- Country: Serbia
- District: Moravica District
- Municipality: Ivanjica

Area
  - Total: 45.60 km^{2} (17.61 sq mi)

Population (2011)
  - Total: 790
  - Density: 17/km^{2} (45/sq mi)
- Time zone: UTC+1 (CET)
  - Summer (DST): UTC+2 (CEST)

Osonica is a village in the municipality of Ivanjica, Serbia. According to the 2011 census, the village has a population of 790 inhabitants.
