= Goračići =

- Village
- Location within Serbia
- Coordinates: 43°46′41″N 20°19′11″E
- Country: Serbia
- District: Moravica District
- Municipality: Lučani

Area
  - Total: 29.77 km^{2} (11.49 sq mi)
- Elevation: 471 m (1,545 ft)

Population (2011)
  - Total: 1,082
  - Density: 36.35/km^{2} (94.13/sq mi)
- Time zone: UTC+1 (CET)
  - Summer (DST): UTC+2 (CEST)

Goračići is a village in the municipality of Lučani, Serbia. According to the 2011 census, the village has a population of 1,082 people.
