= Lisice, Serbia =

Lisice Лисице
- Village
- Location in Serbia
- Coordinates: 43°50′50″N 20°09′24″E
- Country: Serbia
- Region: Šumadija and Western Serbia
- District: Moravica
- Municipality: Lučani

Area
  - Total: 6.34 km^{2} (2.45 sq mi)
- Elevation: 374 m (1,227 ft)

Population (2011)
  - Total: 308
  - Density: 48.6/km^{2} (126/sq mi)
- Time zone: UTC+1 (CET)
  - Summer (DST): UTC+2 (CEST)

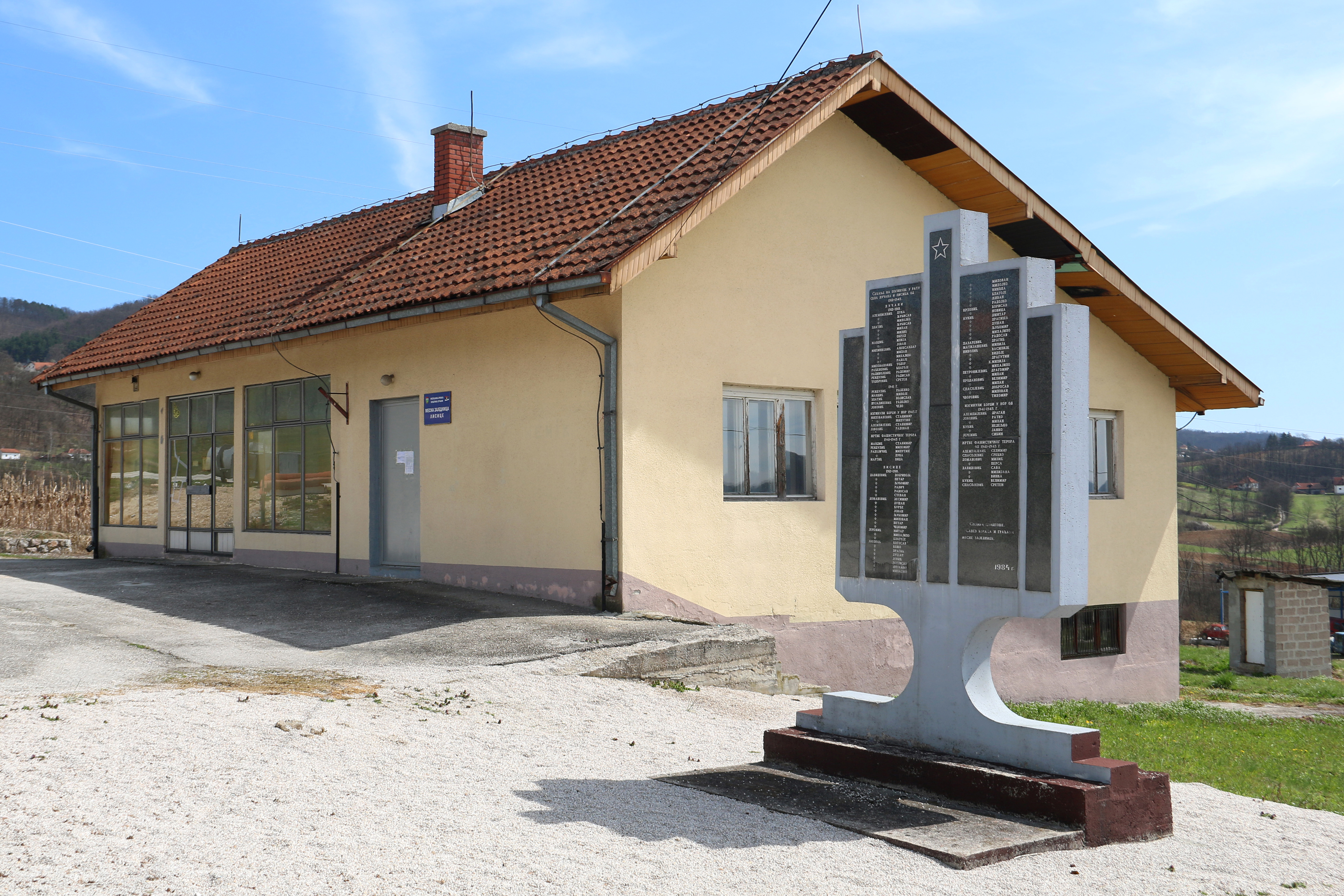
Village of Lisice (municipality of Lucani), Serbia.

Lisice is a village in the municipality of Lučani, Serbia. According to the 2011 census, the village has a population of 308 inhabitants.

== Population ==
Population of Lisice
1948	1953	1961	1971	1981	1991	2002	2011
655	701	676	574	545	458	383	308
