= Krivača (Lučani) =

Krivača Кривача
- Village
- Location within Serbia
- Coordinates: 43°44′17″N 20°16′31″E
- Country: Serbia
- District: Moravica District
- Municipality: Lučani

Area
  - Total: 3.73 km^{2} (1.44 sq mi)
- Elevation: 395 m (1,296 ft)

Population (2011)
  - Total: 157
  - Density: 42.1/km^{2} (109/sq mi)
- Time zone: UTC+1 (CET)
  - Summer (DST): UTC+2 (CEST)

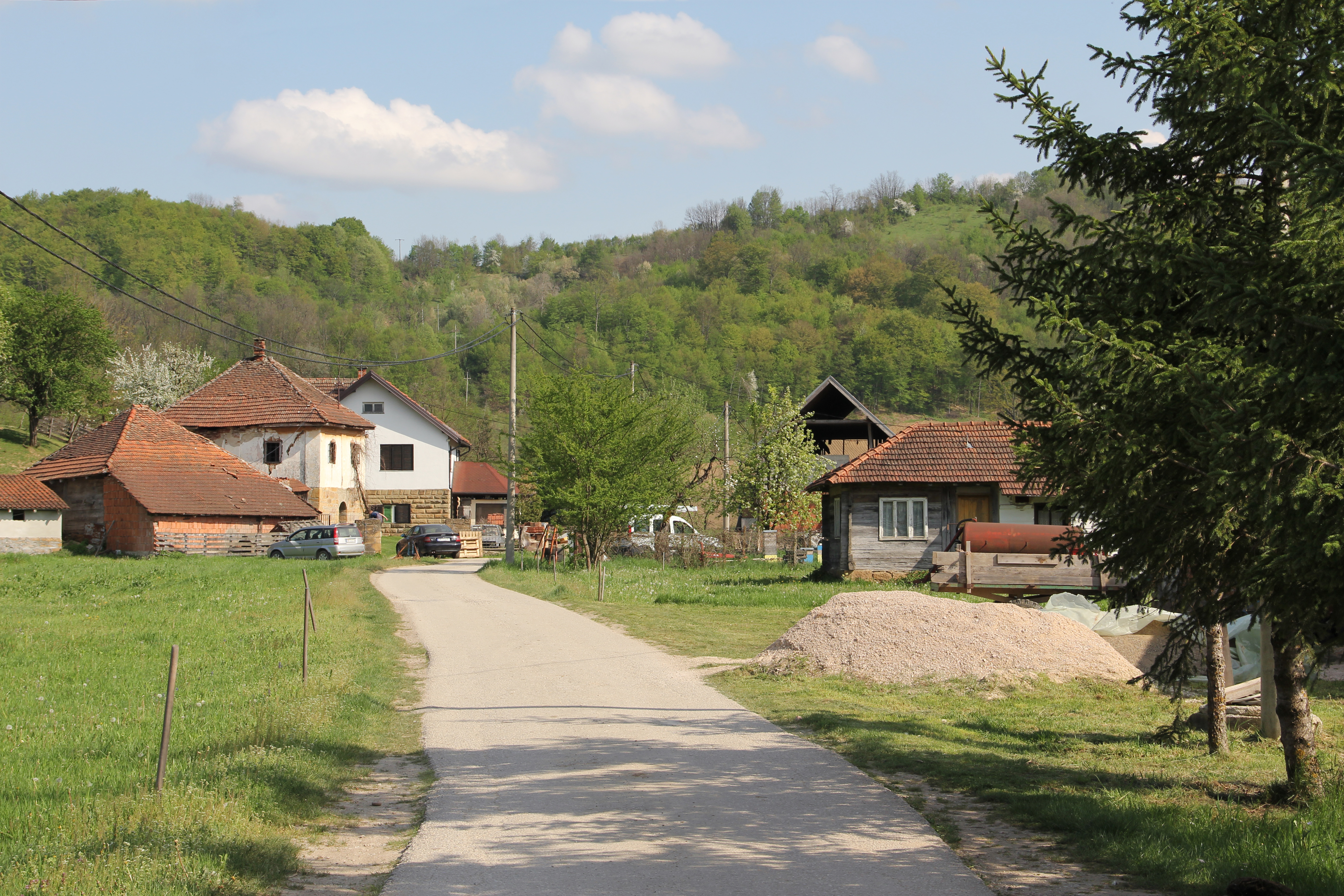
The village of Krivaca (Lucani Municipality), Serbia.

Krivača is a village in the municipality of Lučani, Serbia. According to the 2011 census, the village has a population of 157 people.
