= Puhovo, Serbia =

Puhovo
- Village

- Location within Serbia
- Coordinates: 43°49′16″N 20°10′56″E
- Country: Serbia
- District: Moravica District
- Municipality: Lučani

Area
  - Total: 6.43 km^{2} (2.48 sq mi)
- Elevation: 410 m (1,350 ft)

Population (2011)
  - Total: 618
  - Density: 96.1/km^{2} (249/sq mi)
- Time zone: UTC+1 (CET)
  - Summer (DST): UTC+2 (CEST)

Puhovo is a village in the municipality of Lučani, Serbia. According to the 2011 census, the village has a population of 618 people.
