= Tijanje =

- Village
- Location within Serbia
- Coordinates: 43°50′05″N 20°13′20″E
- Country: Serbia
- District: Moravica District
- Municipality: Lučani

Area
  - Total: 9.47 km^{2} (3.66 sq mi)
- Elevation: 416 m (1,365 ft)

Population (2011)
  - Total: 183
  - Density: 19.3/km^{2} (50.0/sq mi)
- Time zone: UTC+1 (CET)
  - Summer (DST): UTC+2 (CEST)

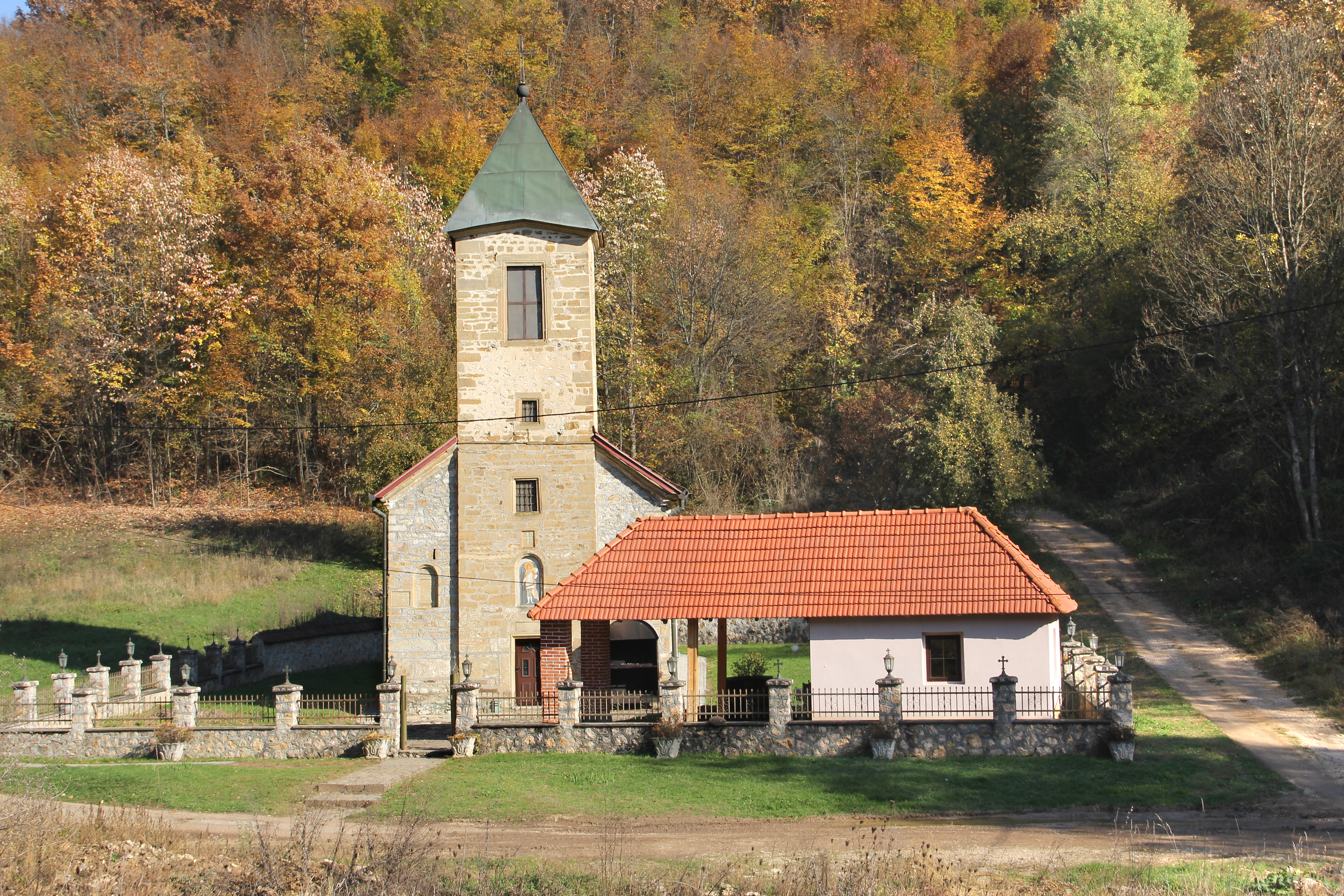

Tijanje is a village in the municipality of Lučani, Serbia. According to the 2011 census, the village has a population of 183 people.
