= Donji Dubac =

- Village
- Location within Serbia
- Coordinates: 43°40′21″N 20°19′23″E
- Country: Serbia
- District: Moravica District
- Municipality: Lučani

Area
  - Total: 26.88 km^{2} (10.38 sq mi)
- Elevation: 788 m (2,585 ft)

Population (2011)
  - Total: 411
  - Density: 15.3/km^{2} (39.6/sq mi)
- Time zone: UTC+1 (CET)
  - Summer (DST): UTC+2 (CEST)

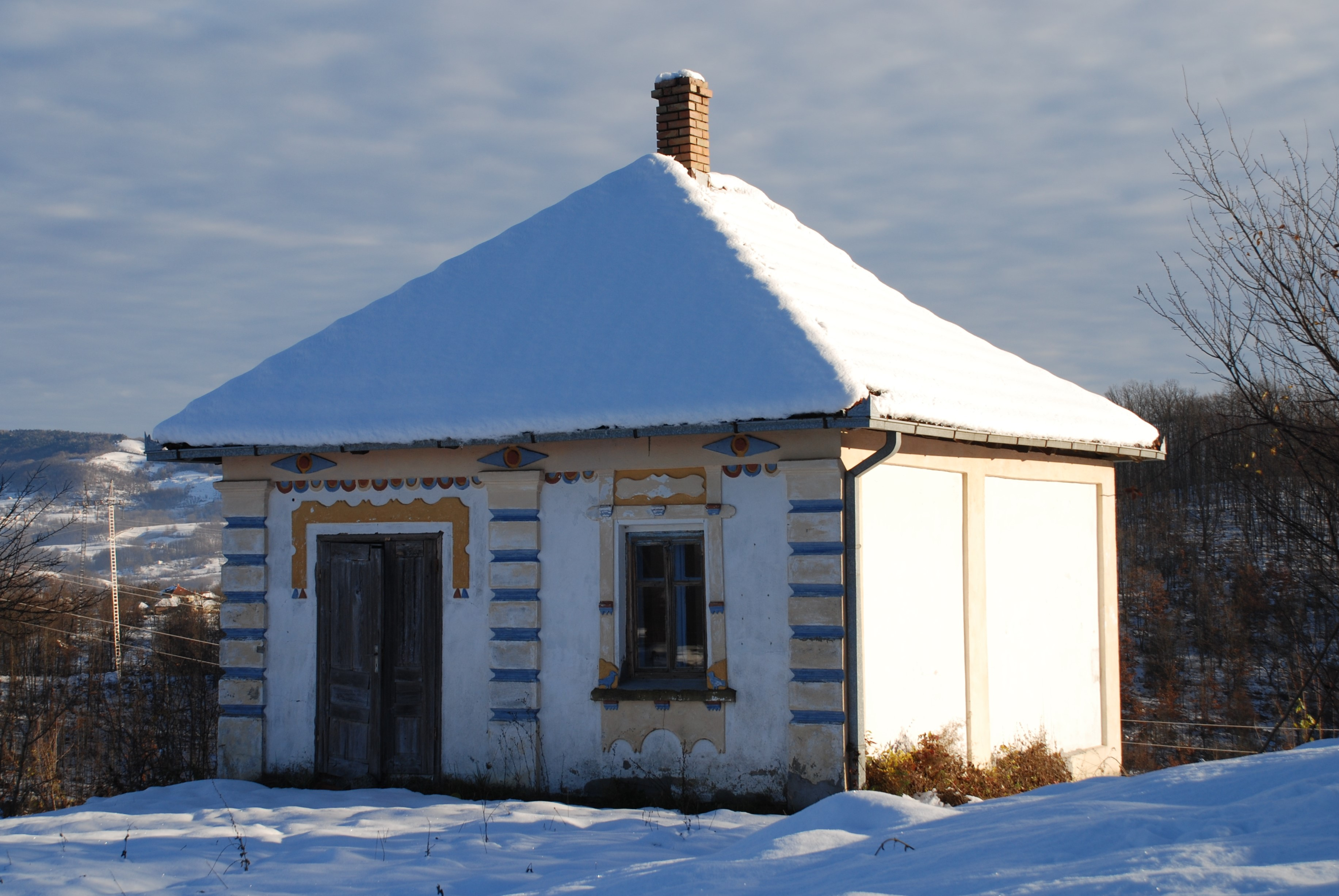
House with wall paintings of Branko Šotra in Donji Dubac, Lučani

Donji Dubac is a village in the municipality of Lučani, Serbia. According to the 2002 census, the village has a population of 526 people.
