= Donja Kravarica =

- Village
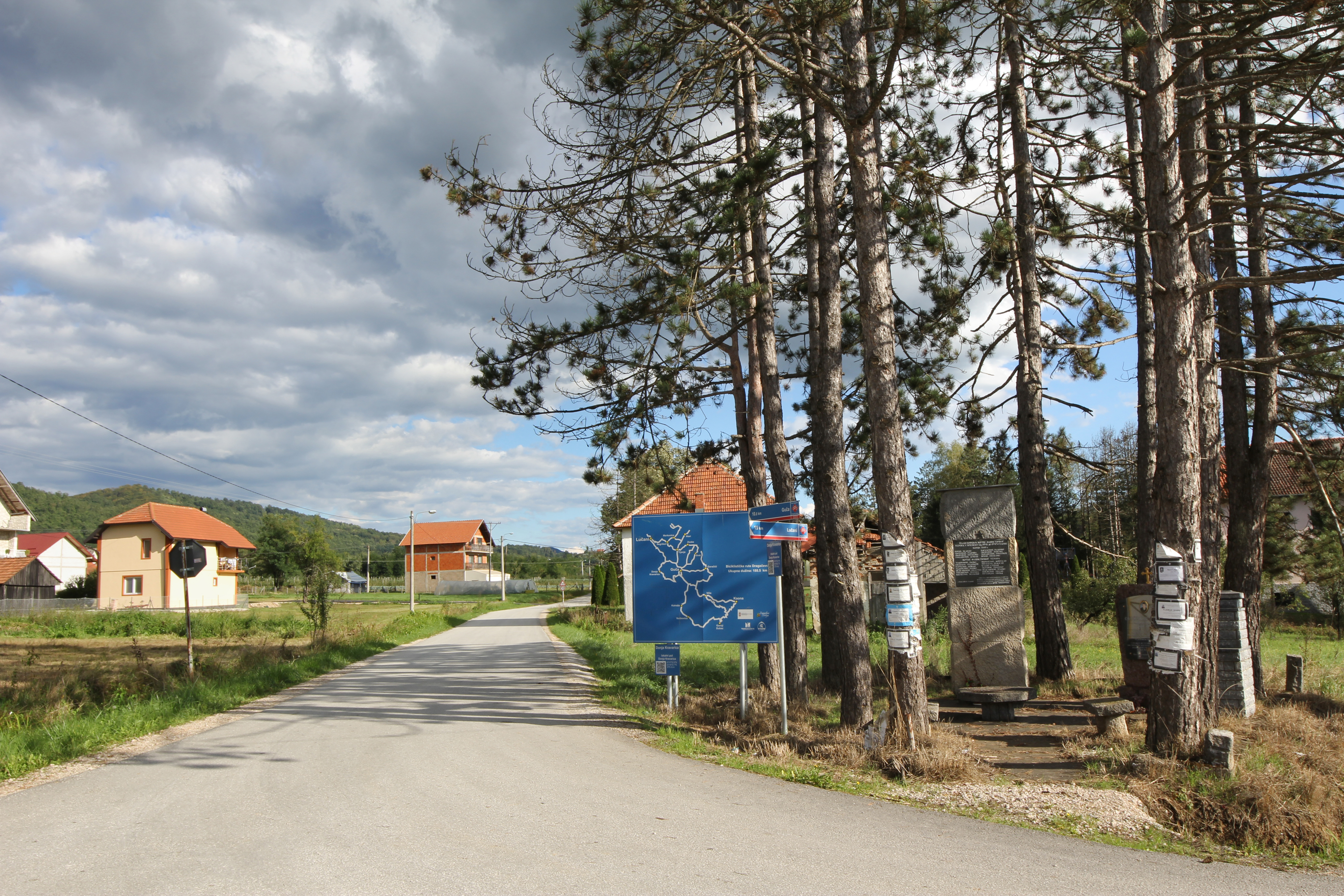
- Photograph capturing sign outside of town.

- Location within Serbia
- Coordinates: 43°46′32″N 20°10′09″E
- Country: Serbia
- District: Moravica District
- Municipality: Lučani

Area
  - Total: 12.79 km^{2} (4.94 sq mi)

Population (2011)
  - Total: 358
  - Density: 28.0/km^{2} (72.5/sq mi)
- Time zone: UTC+1 (CET)
  - Summer (DST): UTC+2 (CEST)

Donja Kravarica is a village in the municipality of Lučani, Serbia. According to the 2011 census, the village has a population of 358 people.
