= Lučani (selo) =

Coordinates: 43.8656°N 20.1558°E

Lučani (selo) Лучани (село)
- Village
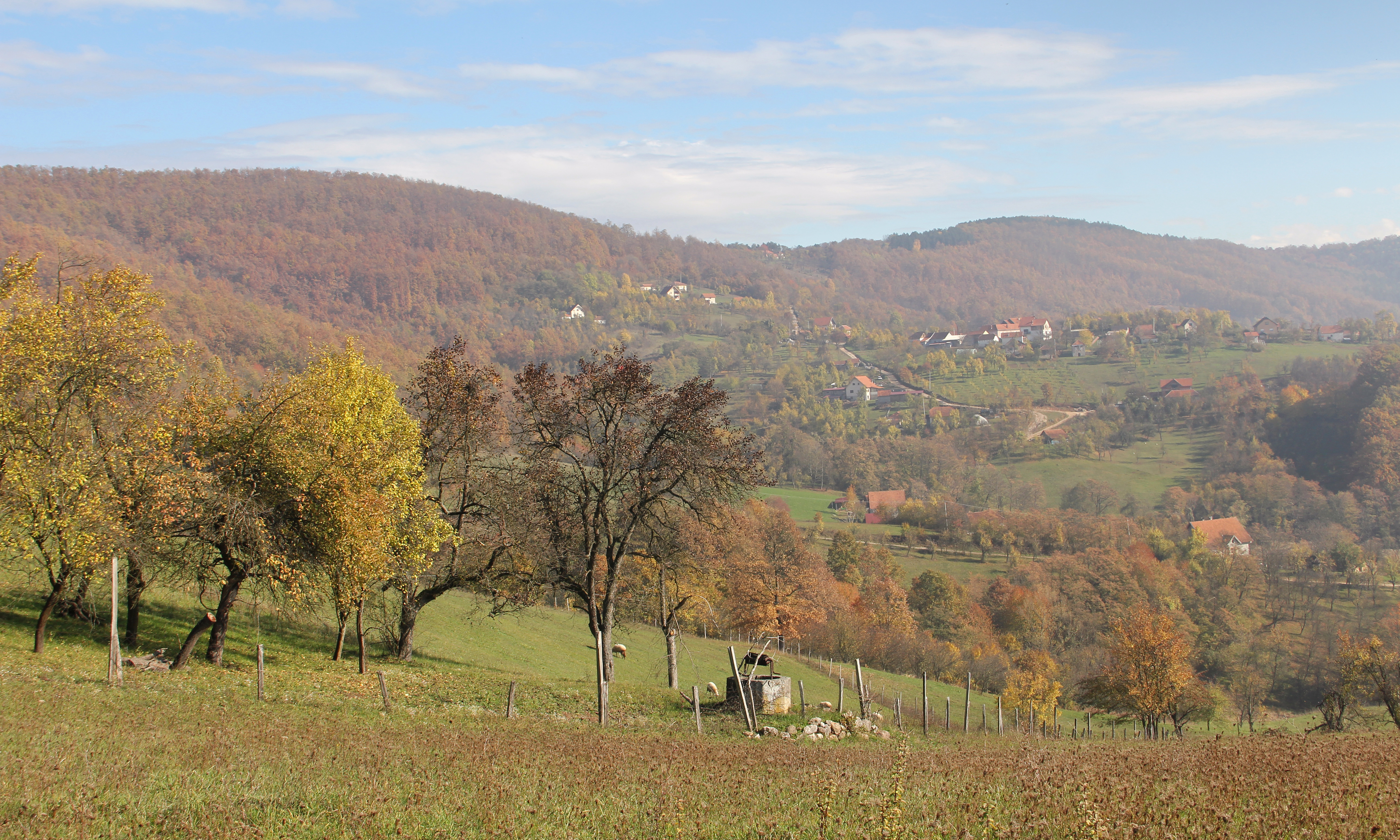
- Interactive map of Lučani (selo)
- Country: Serbia
- District: Moravica District
- Municipality: Lučani

Area
  - Total: 2.75 km^{2} (1.06 sq mi)

Population (2011)
  - Total: 501
  - Density: 182/km^{2} (472/sq mi)
- Time zone: UTC+1 (CET)
  - Summer (DST): UTC+2 (CEST)

Lučani (selo) is a village in the municipality of Lučani, Serbia. According to the 2011 census, the village has a population of 501 people.
