= Dučalovići =

- Village
- Location within Serbia
- Coordinates: 43°53′11″N 20°12′55″E
- Country: Serbia
- District: Moravica District
- Municipality: Lučani

Area
  - Total: 14.92 km^{2} (5.76 sq mi)
- Elevation: 489 m (1,604 ft)

Population (2011)
  - Total: 360
  - Density: 24/km^{2} (62/sq mi)
- Time zone: UTC+1 (CET)
  - Summer (DST): UTC+2 (CEST)

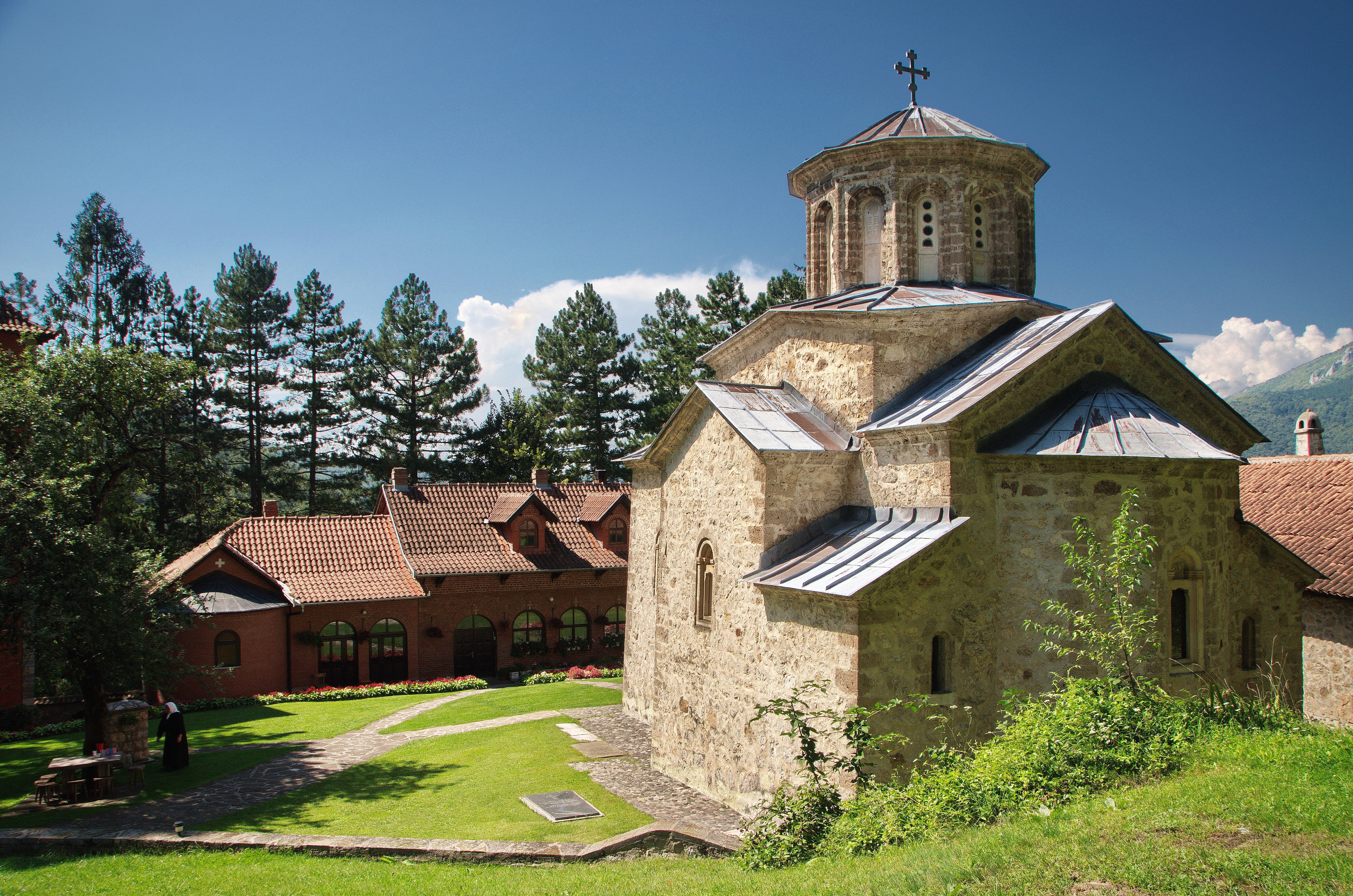
The Holy Trinity Monastery of Dučalovići

Dučalovići is a village in the municipality of Lučani, Serbia. According to the 2011 census, the village has a population of 360 people.
