= Gornji Dubac =

- Village
- Location within Serbia
- Coordinates: 43°39′54″N 20°21′56″E
- Country: Serbia
- District: Moravica District
- Municipality: Lučani

Area
  - Total: 23.39 km^{2} (9.03 sq mi)
- Elevation: 787 m (2,582 ft)

Population (2011)
  - Total: 206
  - Density: 8.81/km^{2} (22.8/sq mi)
- Time zone: UTC+1 (CET)
  - Summer (DST): UTC+2 (CEST)

Gornji Dubac is a village in the municipality of Lučani, Serbia. According to the 2011 census, the village has a population of 206 people.
