= Rtari =

- Village
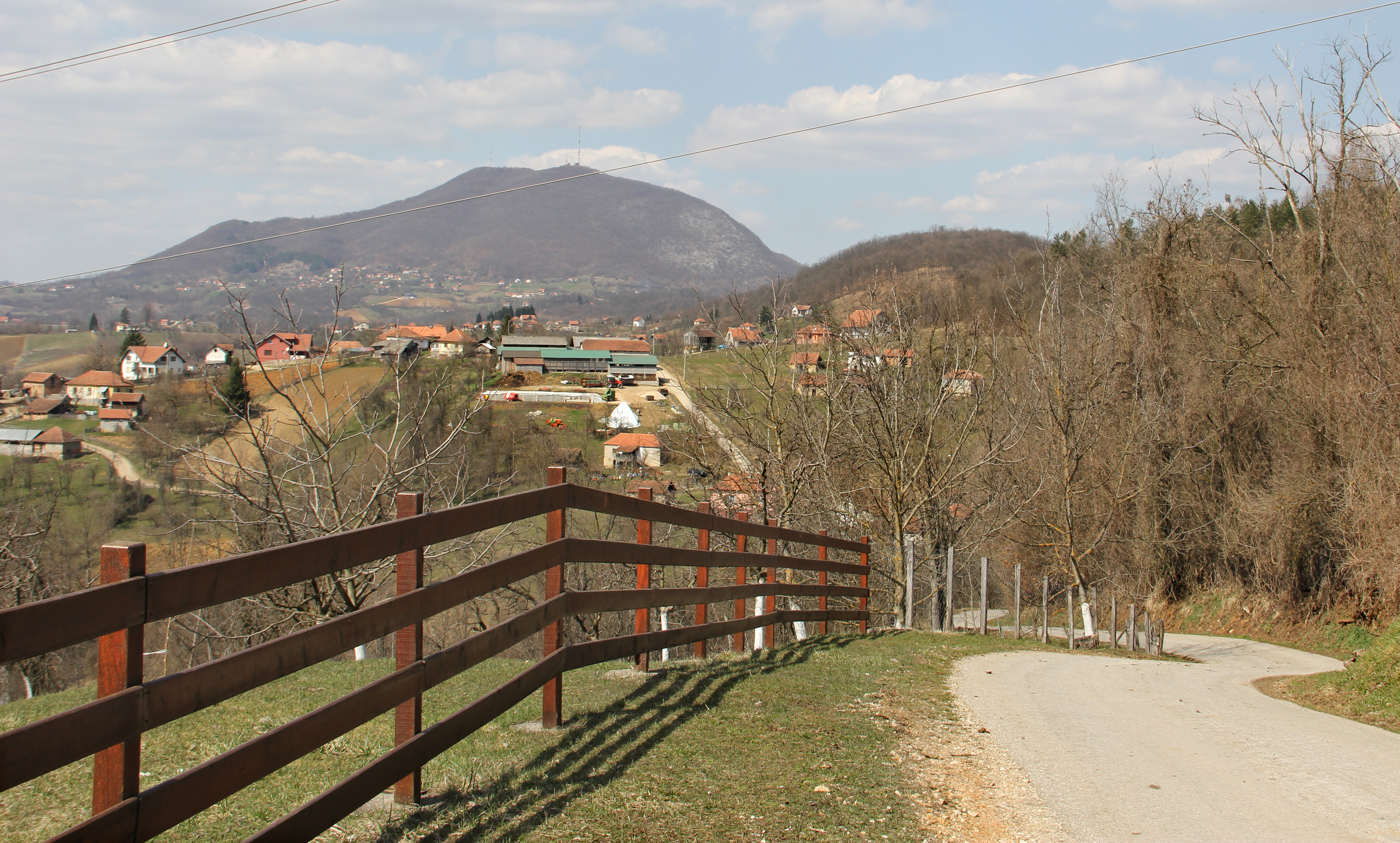

- Location within Serbia
- Coordinates: 43°52′42″N 20°14′26″E
- Country: Serbia
- District: Moravica District
- Municipality: Lučani

Area
  - Total: 8.83 km^{2} (3.41 sq mi)
- Elevation: 541 m (1,775 ft)

Population (2011)
  - Total: 204
  - Density: 23.1/km^{2} (59.8/sq mi)
- Time zone: UTC+1 (CET)
  - Summer (DST): UTC+2 (CEST)

Rtari is a village in the municipality of Lučani, Serbia. According to the 2011 census, the village has a population of 204 people.
