= Rogača (Lučani) =

Rogača Рогача
- Village
- Location within Serbia
- Coordinates: 43°48′12″N 20°16′31″E
- Country: Serbia
- District: Moravica District
- Municipality: Lučani

Area
  - Total: 11.06 km^{2} (4.27 sq mi)
- Elevation: 453 m (1,486 ft)

Population (2011)
  - Total: 277
  - Density: 25.0/km^{2} (64.9/sq mi)
- Time zone: UTC+1 (CET)
  - Summer (DST): UTC+2 (CEST)

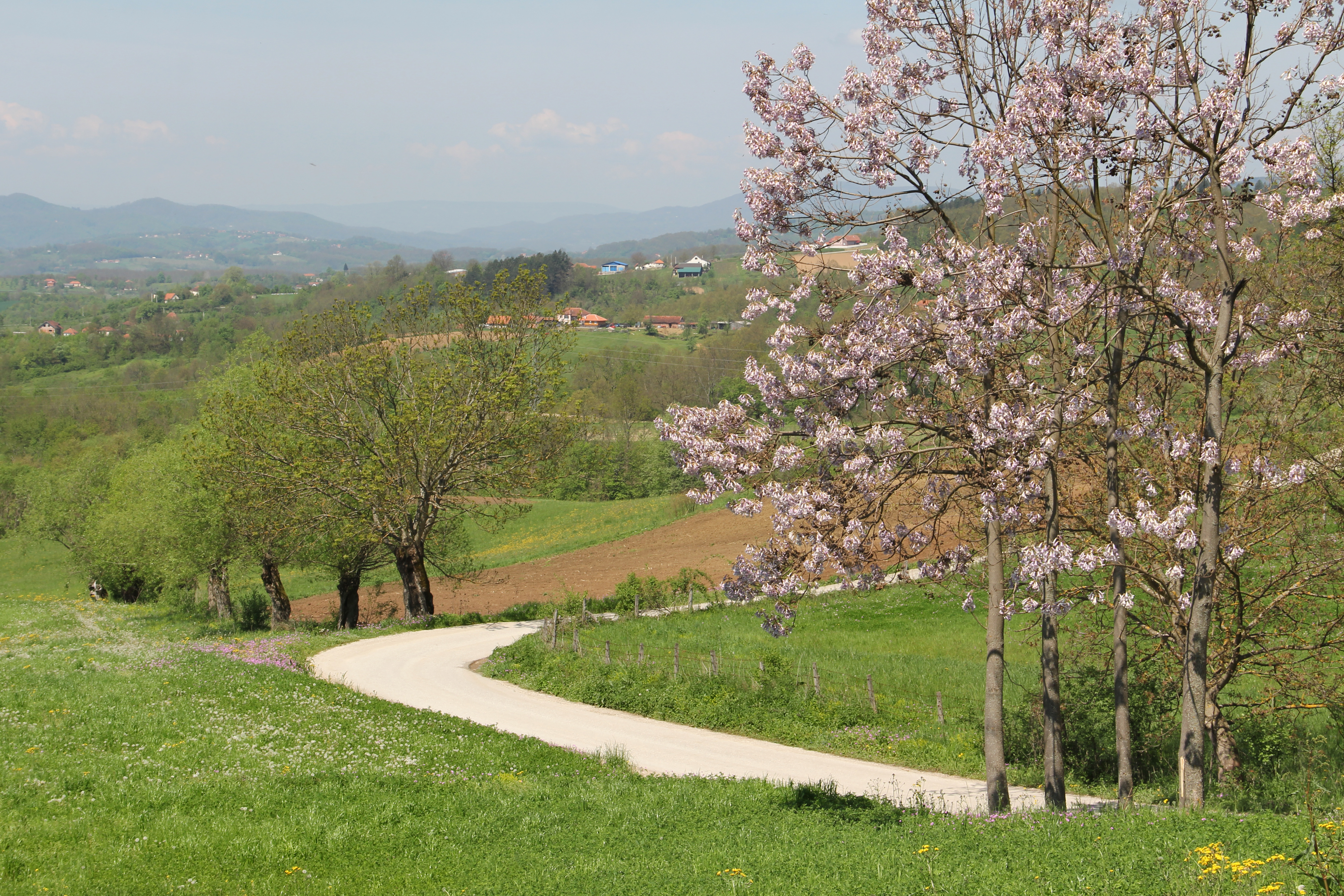
Rogača

Rogača is a village in the municipality of Lučani, Serbia. According to the 2011 census, the village has a population of 277 people.
