= Markovica =

- Village
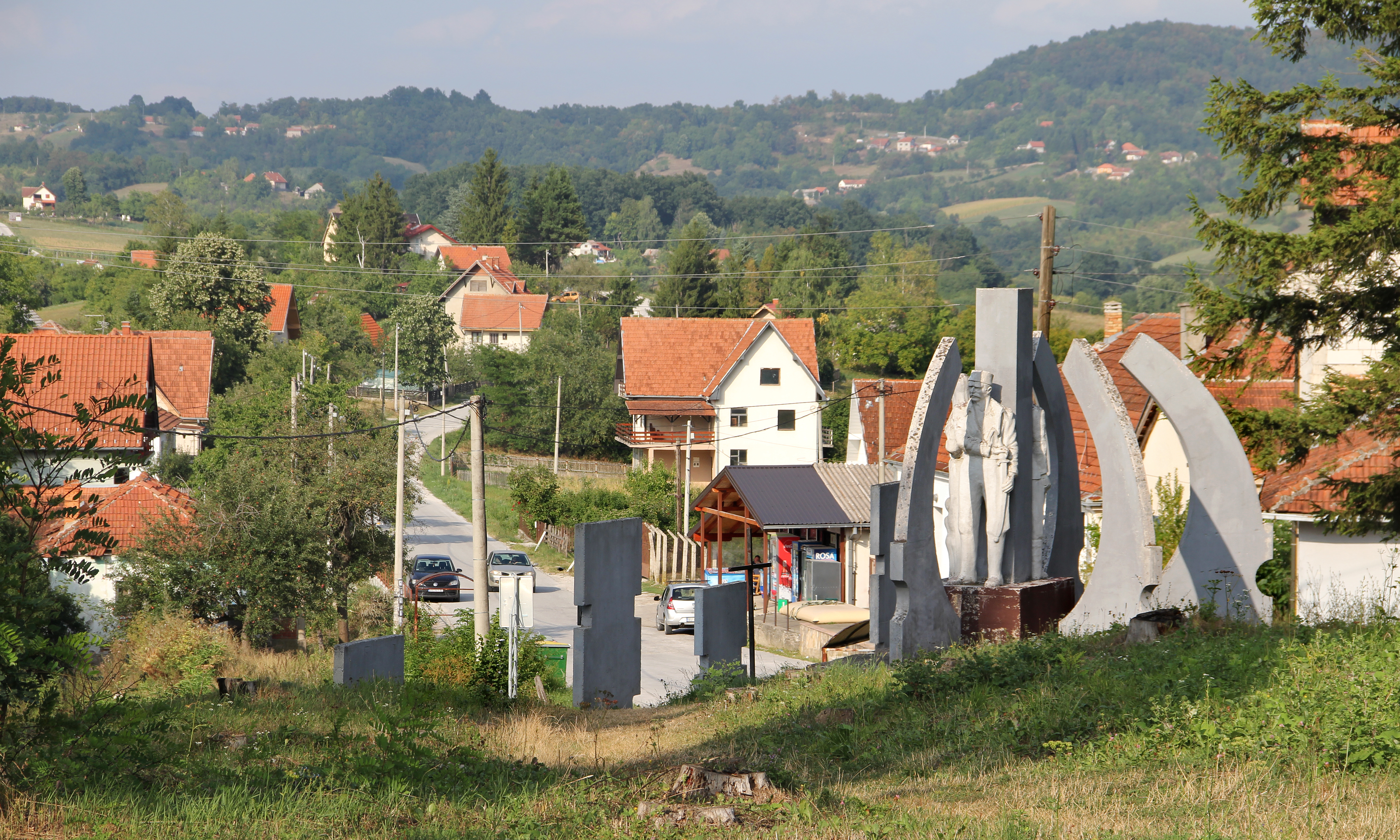

- Location within Serbia
- Coordinates: 43°51′27″N 20°12′09″E
- Country: Serbia
- District: Moravica District
- Municipality: Lučani

Area
  - Total: 3.31 km^{2} (1.28 sq mi)
- Elevation: 460 m (1,510 ft)

Population (2011)
  - Total: 157
  - Density: 47.4/km^{2} (123/sq mi)
- Time zone: UTC+1 (CET)
  - Summer (DST): UTC+2 (CEST)

Markovica is a village in the municipality of Lučani, Serbia. According to the 2011 census, the village has a population of 157 people.
