= Negrišori =

- Village
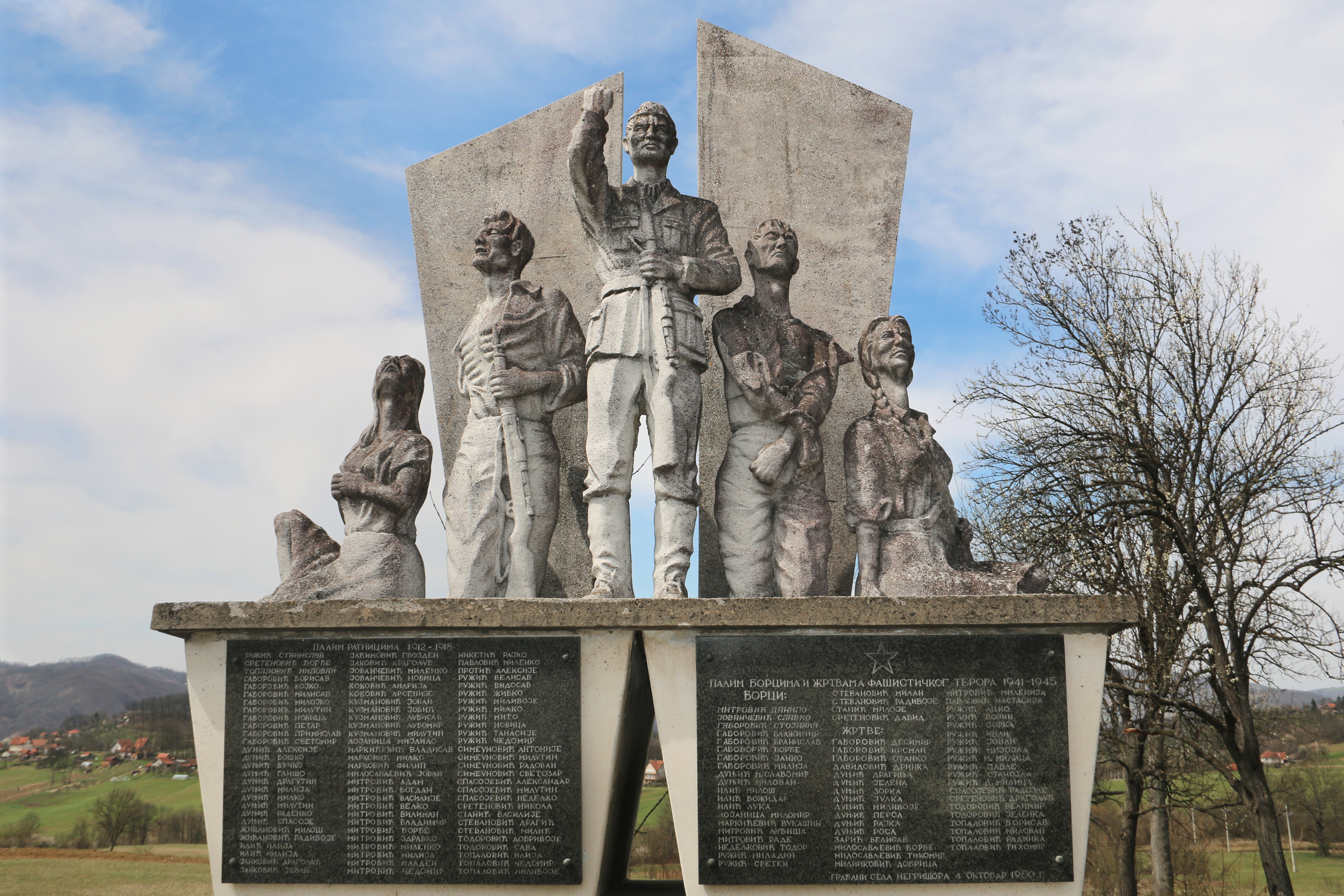
- Monument to the victims of the First and Second World War, destroyed by the Chinese road building company in 2023

- Location within Serbia
- Coordinates: 43°50′12″N 20°11′10″E
- Country: Serbia
- District: Moravica District
- Municipality: Lučani

Area
  - Total: 9.35 km^{2} (3.61 sq mi)
- Elevation: 419 m (1,375 ft)

Population (2011)
  - Total: 499
  - Density: 53.4/km^{2} (138/sq mi)
- Time zone: UTC+1 (CET)
  - Summer (DST): UTC+2 (CEST)

Negrišori is a village in the municipality of Lučani, Serbia. According to the 2011 census, the village has a population of 499 people.
