= Kotraža (Lučani) =

Kotraža Котража
- Village
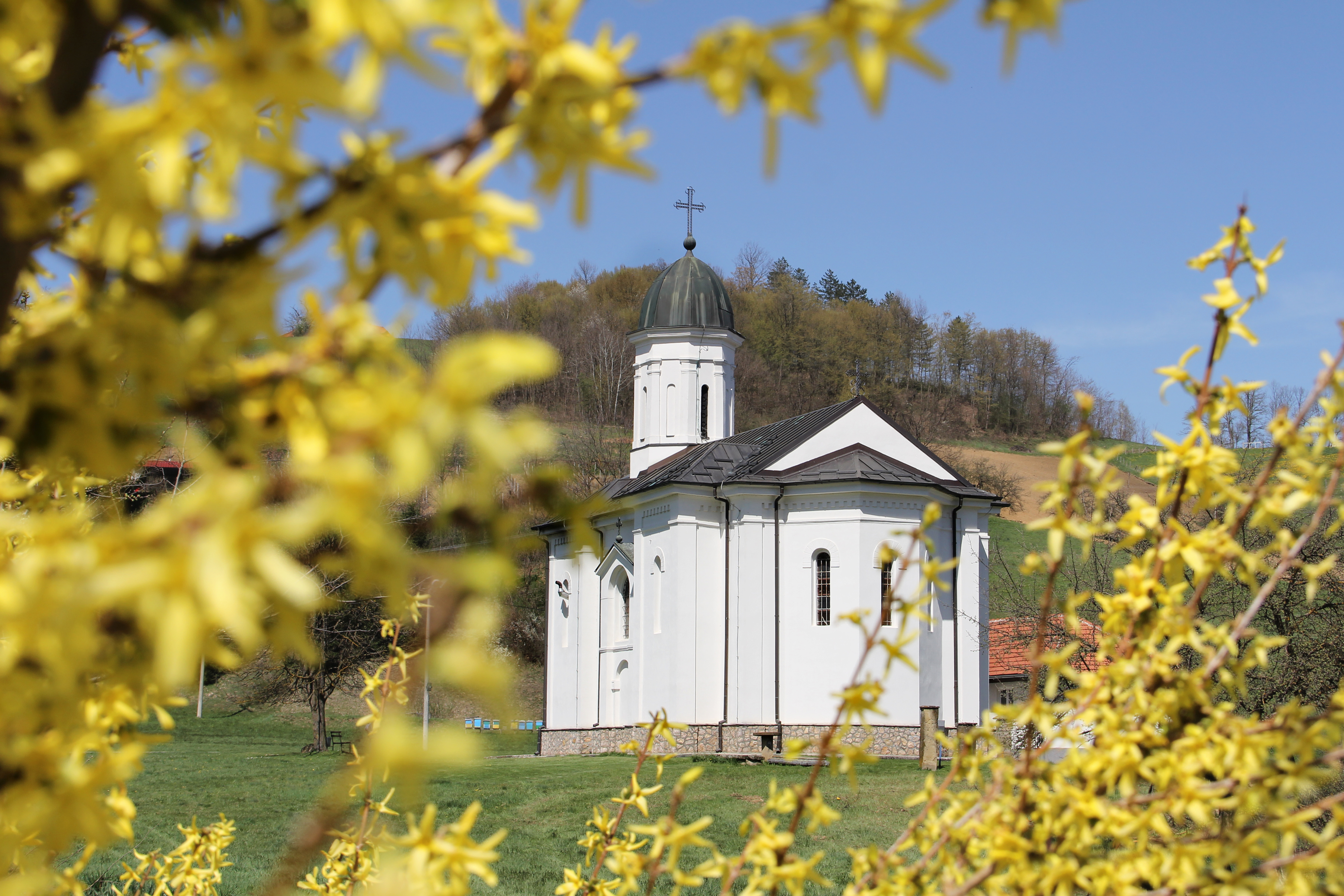
- Church of Saint George in the village

- Location within Serbia
- Coordinates: 43°42′19″N 20°13′57″E
- Country: Serbia
- District: Moravica District
- Municipality: Lučani

Area
  - Total: 15.05 km^{2} (5.81 sq mi)
- Elevation: 488 m (1,601 ft)

Population (2011)
  - Total: 806
  - Density: 53.6/km^{2} (139/sq mi)
- Time zone: UTC+1 (CET)
  - Summer (DST): UTC+2 (CEST)

Kotraža is a village in the municipality of Lučani, Serbia. According to the 2011 census, the village has a population of 806 people.
