= Zeoke (Lučani) =

Zeoke Зеоке
- Village
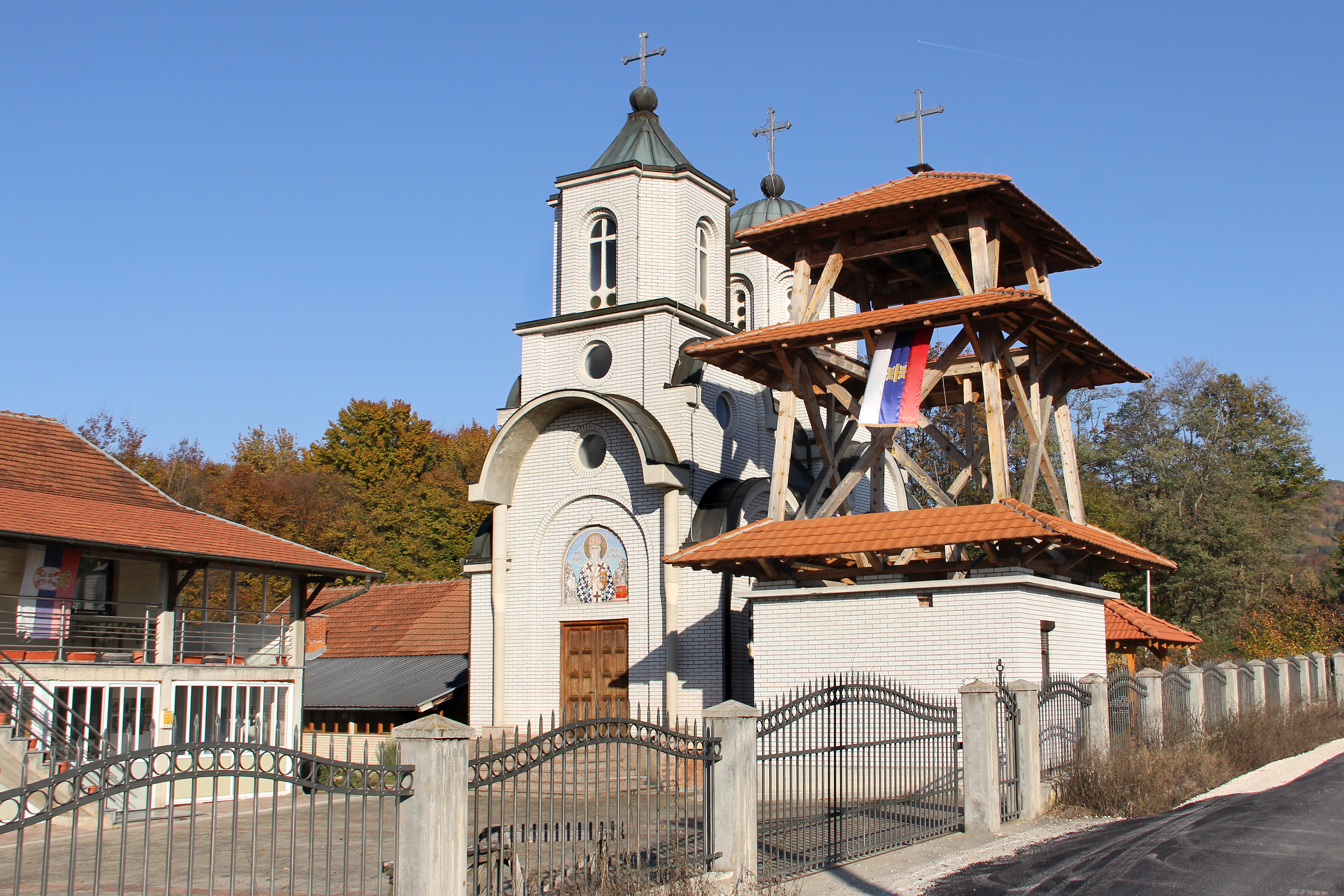
- Zeoke in 2021

- Location within Serbia
- Coordinates: 43°50′51″N 20°15′55″E
- Country: Serbia
- District: Moravica District
- Municipality: Lučani

Area
  - Total: 10.74 km^{2} (4.15 sq mi)
- Elevation: 636 m (2,087 ft)

Population (2011)
  - Total: 222
  - Density: 20.7/km^{2} (53.5/sq mi)
- Time zone: UTC+1 (CET)
  - Summer (DST): UTC+2 (CEST)

Zeoke is a village in the municipality of Lučani, Serbia. According to the 2011 census, the village has a population of 222 people.
