= Guča =

Guča Гуча
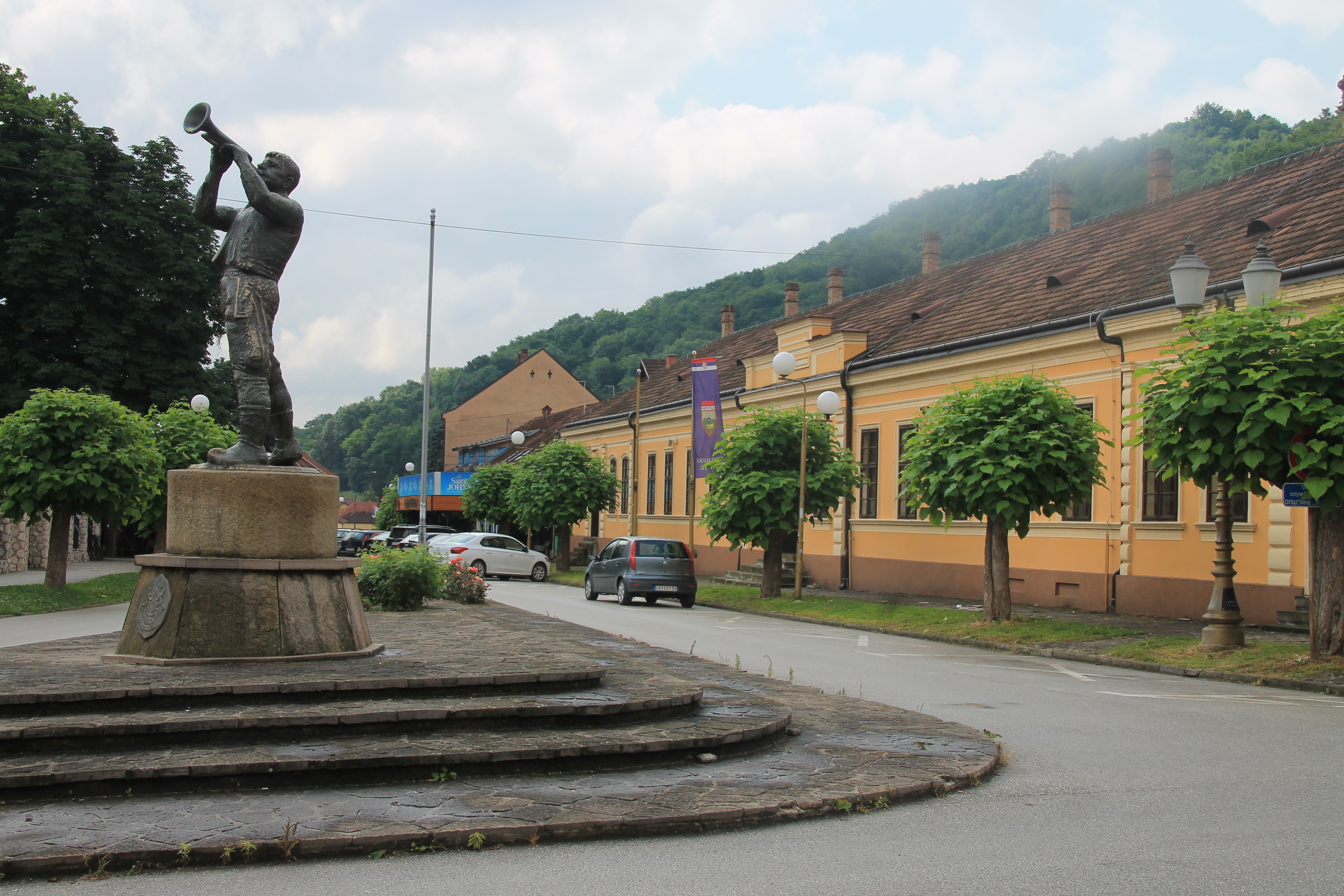
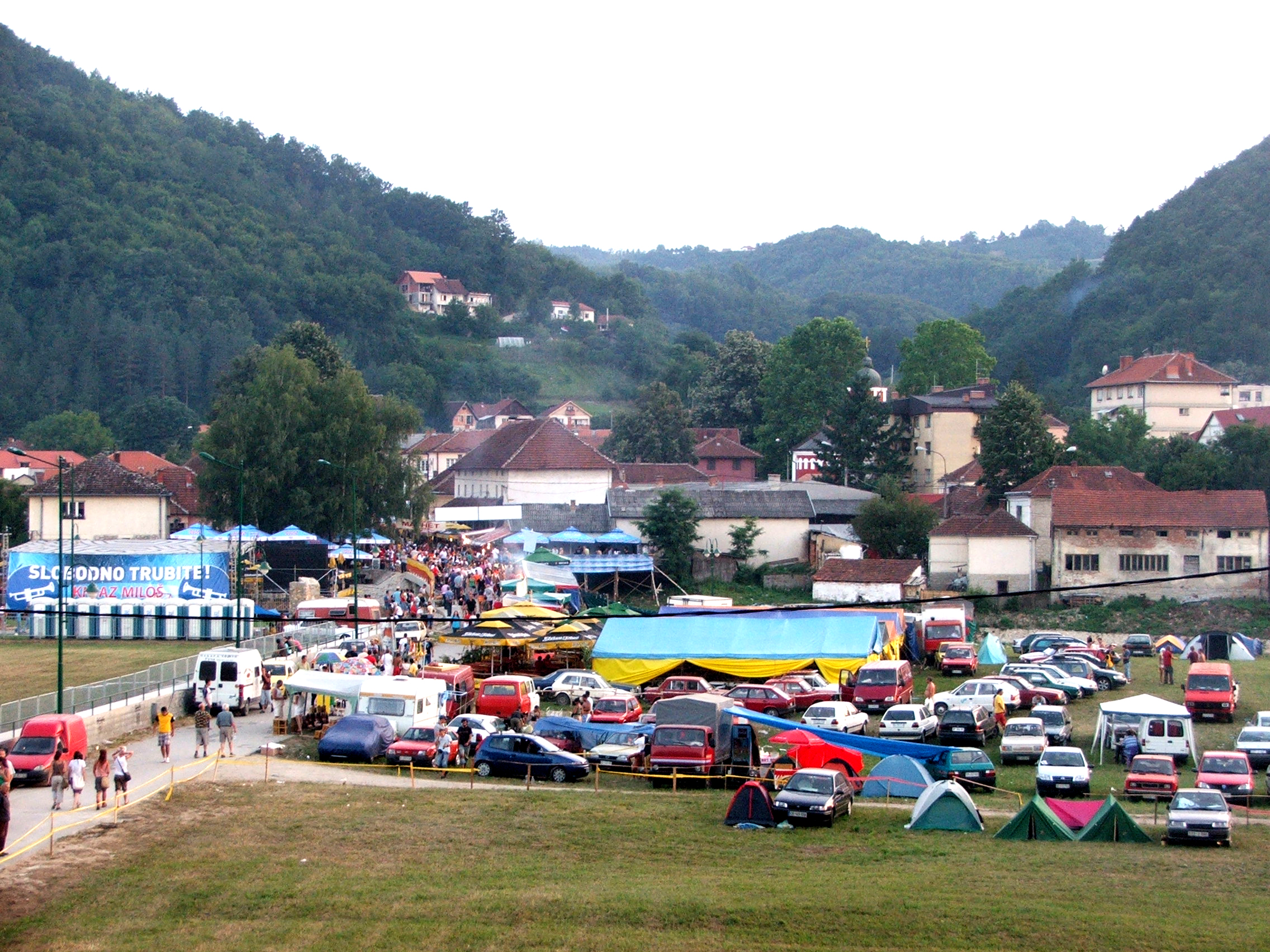

- Location within Serbia
- Coordinates: 43°46′41″N 20°13′32″E
- Country: Serbia
- District: Moravica District
- Municipality: Lučani

Area
  - City: 0.55 km^{2} (0.21 sq mi)
- Elevation: 328 m (1,076 ft)

Population (2022)
  - City: 3,185
  - Density: 5,800/km^{2} (15,000/sq mi)
  - Urban: 1,491
- Time zone: UTC+1 (CET)
  - Summer (DST): UTC+2 (CEST)
- Postal Code: 32230
- Area code: 32

Guča (Serbian Cyrillic: Гуча, pronounced [ɡûtʃa]) is a small town near the city of Čačak, located in the Lučani municipality, Moravica District, in the Dragačevo region of western Serbia. As of 2022 census, it has a population of 3,185 inhabitants. It is notable as the location of the Guča Trumpet Festival, held annually on a weekend in early August and attended by several hundred thousand visitors.

== Administrative divisions ==
Guča was a separate municipality until 1965, when it was incorporated into the municipality of Lučani. For census purposes, Guča is divided into two adjacent settlements, northern Guča (selo) (lit. Guča Village, population 1,694) and southern Guča (varošica) (lit. Guča Town, 1,491), separated by the Bjelica river.

== History ==
=== June 2026 Ammonia Incident ===
On 28 June 2026 at approximately 12:50 AM, a chemical gas, Ammonia leaked in the Prvomajska street number 9 of Guča. Residents and citizens all across Serbia were texted with the contact "PRODNADJI_ME" and alerted. Residents were told to stay inside and close their windows. Six people were examined in the Emergency room of the General Hospital in Čačak. Everyone who were hospitalized were revealed to be in good condition and were released home for treatment. Rescuers and Firefighters finished their operations at 6:55 AM.
