= Rudnička Morava =

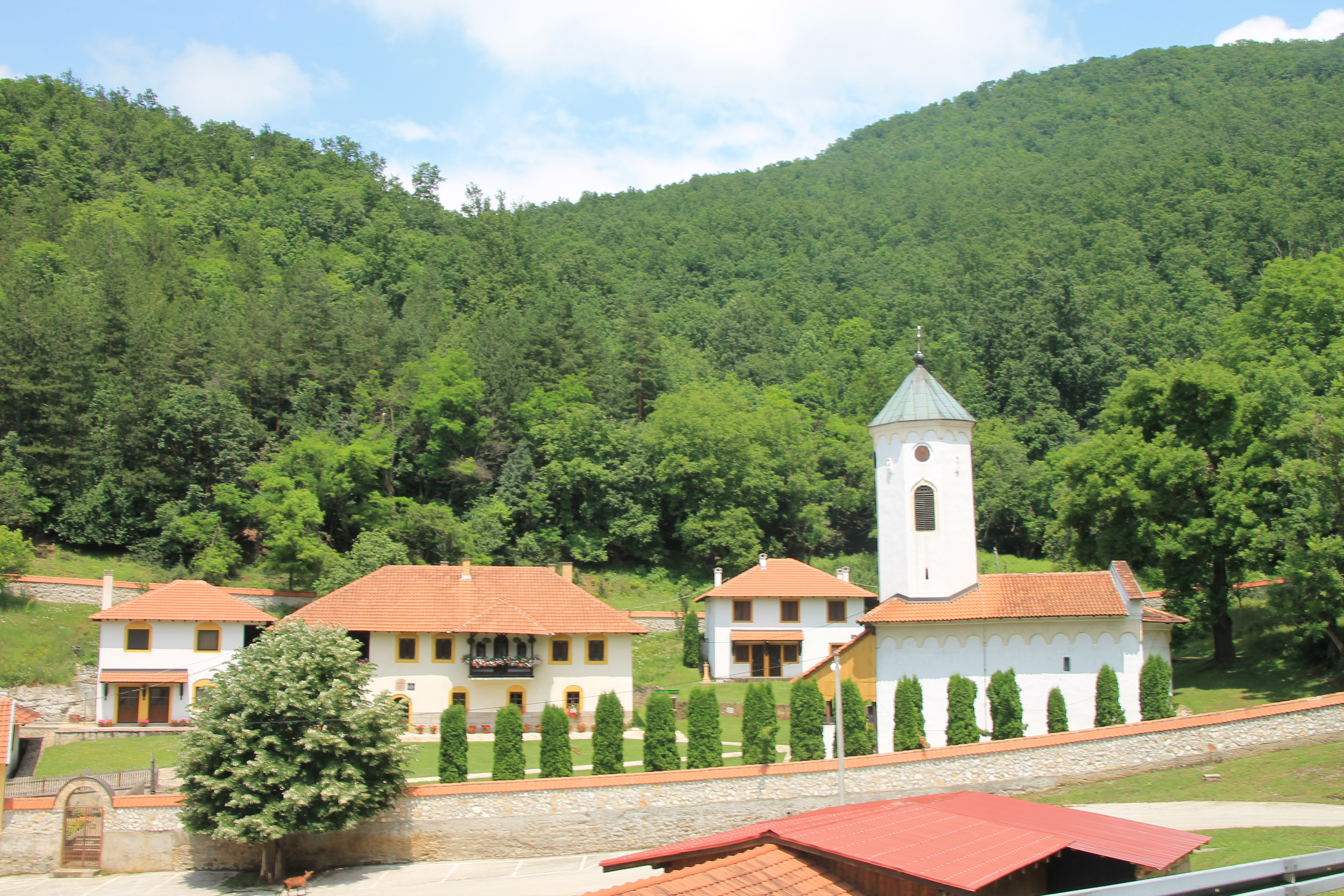
Vujan Monastery in Prislonica.

Rudnička Morava (Serbian: Рудничка Морава) is a historical subregion (or microregion) in Western Pomoravlje in central Serbia. It includes villages to the east of Čačak and northwest of Kraljevo. It was a knežina (administrative unit) in Revolutionary Serbia and was then organized as a srez of the Rudnik okrug in the Principality of Serbia.

== Settlements ==
Today, the microregion of Rudnička Morava includes 31 villages near the town of Čačak in the Moravica District: Goričani, Katrga, Mršinci, Kukići, Mrčajevci, Bečanj, Bresnica, Zablaće, Baluga Trnavska, Vapa, Donja Gorevnica, Stančići, Mojsinje, Konjevići, Baluga Ljubićska, Donja Trepča, Ostra, Vujetinci, Gornja Trepča, Prislonica, Preljina, Ljubić, Sokolići, Rakova, Trbušani, Vranići, Milićevci, Prijevor, Vidova, Miokovci and Gornja Gorevnica; and four villages near the town of Kraljevo in the Raška District: Obrva, Cvetke, Lađevci and Tavnik. The population of Rudnička Morava in the Moravica District is 28,252 people that live in 9,162 households, and the majority of villages are engaged in agriculture. The population of Rudnička Morava in the Raška District is 3,841 people that live in 1,096 households, and the majority of villages are engaged in agriculture.

== History ==
During the First Serbian Uprising (1804–13), the Rudnička Morava area was organized into a knežina (administrative unit) of Revolutionary Serbia, belonging to the Rudnik nahiya. The Rudnik nahiya had included two knežina (Christian self-governing village groups) prior to 1804, the Crna Gora–Podgora (which included what is later known as the Takovo area), and the Rudnička Morava (area from Vujan to Western Morava); with the uprising, the Kačer knežina was also organized, including the northern and western foothills of Rudnik to the eastern part of the Jasenica river. The knežina did not correspond to the earlier Ottoman nahiya of Rudnička Morava ("Morava-i Rudnik"), mentioned in the 16th century as a unification of the two nahiyas of Rudnik and Morava; that nahiya corresponded to the present-day regions of Kačer and Takovo and further territory to the left of the Western Morava.

The Rudnik nahiya was liberated at the start of the uprising. The villages of Rudnička Morava involved in the uprising were Prislonica, Cvetke, Donja Gorevnica, Preljina, Miokovci, Mojsinje, Stančići, Milićevci, Tavnik, Rakova, Gornja Gorevnica, Obrva, Jančići, Bečanj, Katrga, Brđani, Mrčajevci, Bresnica, Lađevci, Ljubić, Rošci, Vrnčani, Družetići, Trbušani, Vranići, Donja Trepča, Baluga, Ješevac, Miločaj, Sokolići, Prijevor. Other villages, regarded part of Rudnička Morava presently, were part of the knežina of Čačanska Morava–Podibar of the Požega nahija, such as Kukići, Zablaće, Mršinci. Among the most notable participants in the Serbian Revolution that hailed from Rudnička Morava are:

- Lazar Mutap (1765–1815), vojvoda in Western Pomoravlje, from Prislonica.
- Jovan Kursula (1768–1813), duelist, from Cvetke.
- Raka Levajac (1777–1833), vojvoda of Užice and Morava, from Donja Gorevnica.

== Culture ==
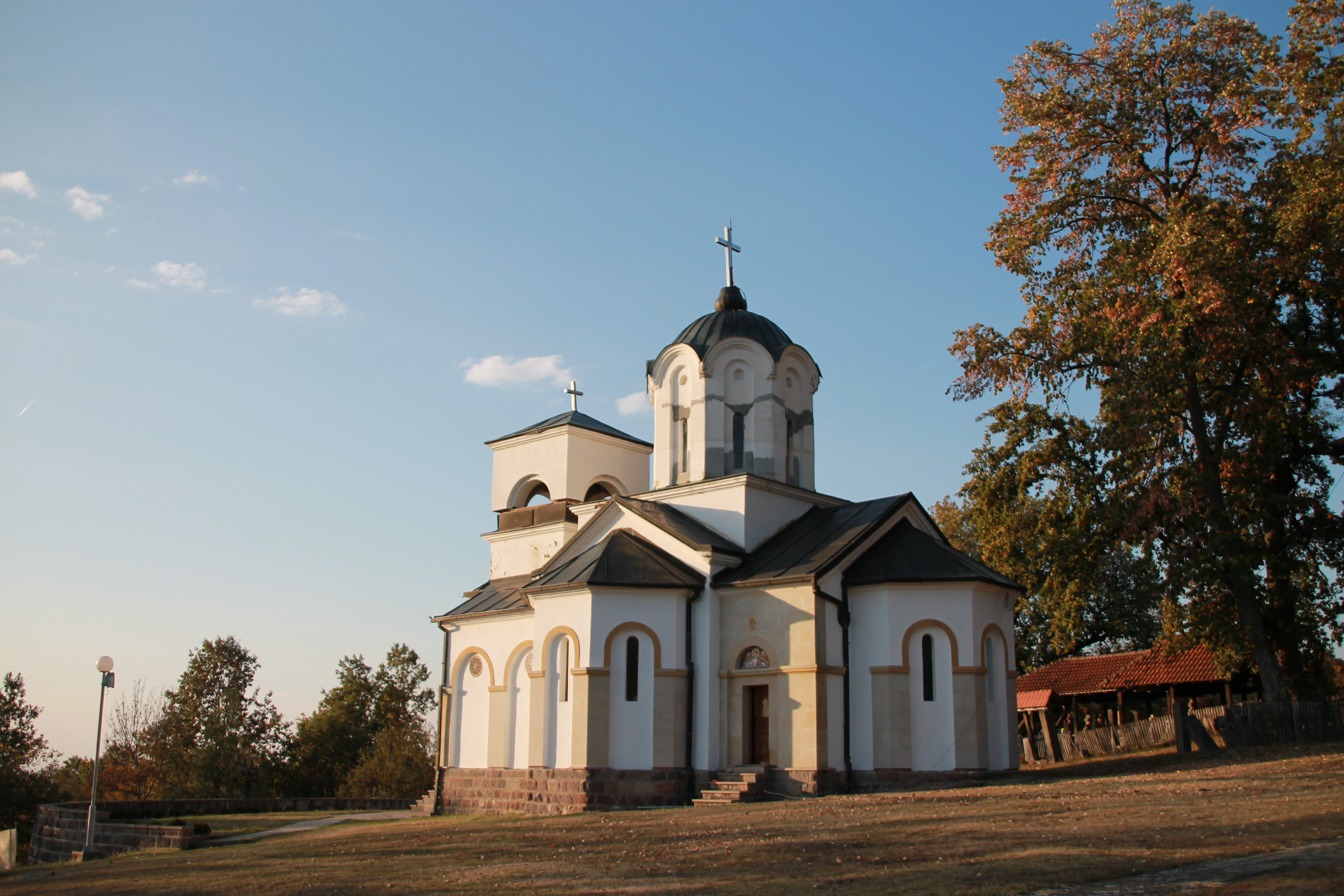
Church in Cvetke.

There is the Church of Paul the Apostle, in Cvetke, and the Vujan Monastery, in Prislonica.

Cultural events include Kupusijada (cabbage dishes festival) in Mrčajevci, flute festival in Prislonica, an annual horse pulling event in Cvetke and regularly held folk music festivals and sports tournaments in Lađevci. Rural tourism households are found in Prislonica.

== Sources ==
- Arsenijević, Slobodan; Čeliković, Borisav (2016). Gruža i Rudnička Morava. Udruženje građana Urbana bezbednost. ISBN 978-86-80512-00-6.
- Čeliković, Borisav, ed. (2011). Rudnički okrug, Rudnička Morava: naselja, poreklo stanovništva, običaji. Belgrade: SANU. ISBN 978-86-519-0961-3.
- Marković, Života (1994). "Представници Рудничке и Пожешке (Чачанске) нахије у Правитељствујушчем совјету и скупштинама народних старешина од 1804. до 1813. године" [Représentants des nahies de Roudnik et de Pojéga (Tchatchak) au Conseil d'administration et aux assemblées des chefs du peuple entre les années 1804 et 1813]. Зборник радова Народног музеја у Чачку. XXIV: 61–82.
- Pavlović, Dragoljub M. (1990). "Учесници српских үстанака од 1804. до 1815. године из Рудничке и Пожешке нахије" [Participants aux insurrections serbes de 1804 et 1815 nés dans les nahies de Rudnik et de Požega] (PDF). Зборник радова Народног музеја у Чачку. XX: 115–131.
- Peruničić, Branko (1968). Čačak i Gornji Milanovac, 1815-1865. Izdanje Istorijskog arhiva.
- Ristić, Lela; Vujičić, Milan; Leković, Miljan (2016). "Tourism as a factor of sustainable development of rural areas belonging to Rudnička Morava". Економика пољопривреде. 63 (2): 665–680.
- Tomović, Gordana (2000). "жупа Морава и нахија Морава". In Ристић, Љубодраг П. (ed.). Научни скуп Рудо Поље, Карановац, Краљево: од првих помена до Првог светског рата. Balkanološki institut SANU. pp. 33-. ISBN 978-86-7179-032-1.
