= Church of Preobraženje, Dajići =

Church in Moravica District, Serbia

Church of Preobraženje Црква Преображења Crkva Preobraženja
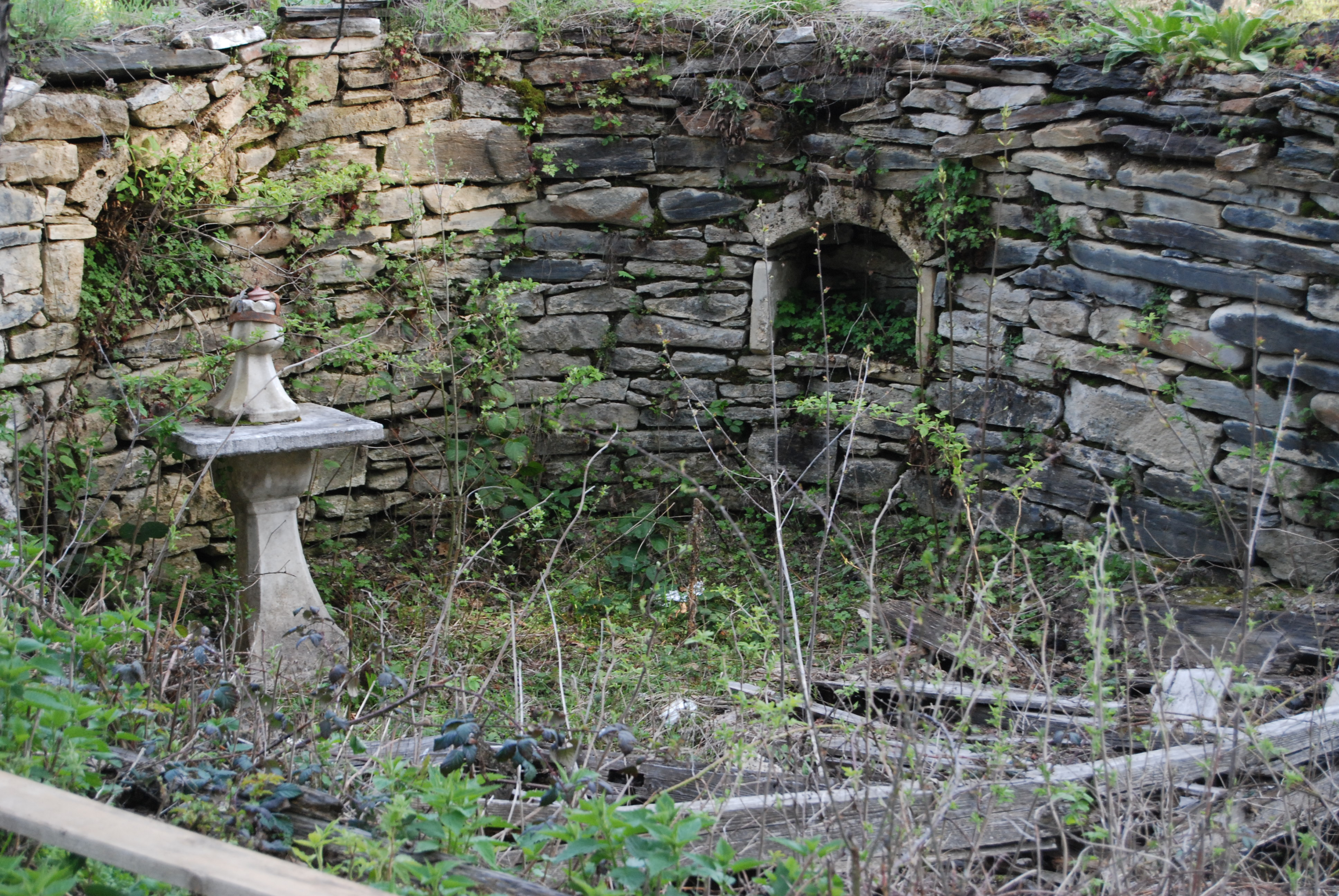
- Church of Preobraženje, Dajići.

Religion
- Affiliation: Serbian Orthodox
- Leadership: Institute for Cultural Heritage Preservation Kraljevo

Location
- Location: Dajići, Ivanjica, Serbia
- Interactive map of Church of Preobraženje; Црква Преображења; Crkva Preobraženja
- Coordinates: 43°24′25″N 20°17′26″E

Architecture
- Type: Serbo-Byzantine

Website
- Official website

The Church of Preobraženje is a church of the Serbian Orthodox Church, located in the hamlet of Middle River, village of Dajići, Ivanjica. It is on the list of protected cultural property and has the status of cultural monuments.

== Architecture ==
It was built as a cemetery chapel with harmonious proportions, a single-nave with a semicircular apse in a beam, low stone walls, vault and high-shingle roof. The church is surrounded by tall tombstones. One of the few examples of churches at Old Vlac, which the rock material repeats the form of wooden churches. In the church of Preobraženje there is a chandelier of wrought iron fine handicrafts and marble court with sanctified water, probably commissioned for this church. Dining table and a marble baptismal font in the altar area from pre-Turkish period shows that the church was built on the foundations of an older Christian churches. The church in its present form was built in the late 18th and early 19th centuries, during the settlement of the village Dajići.
