= Lipnica, Čačak =

Lipnica Липница
- Village
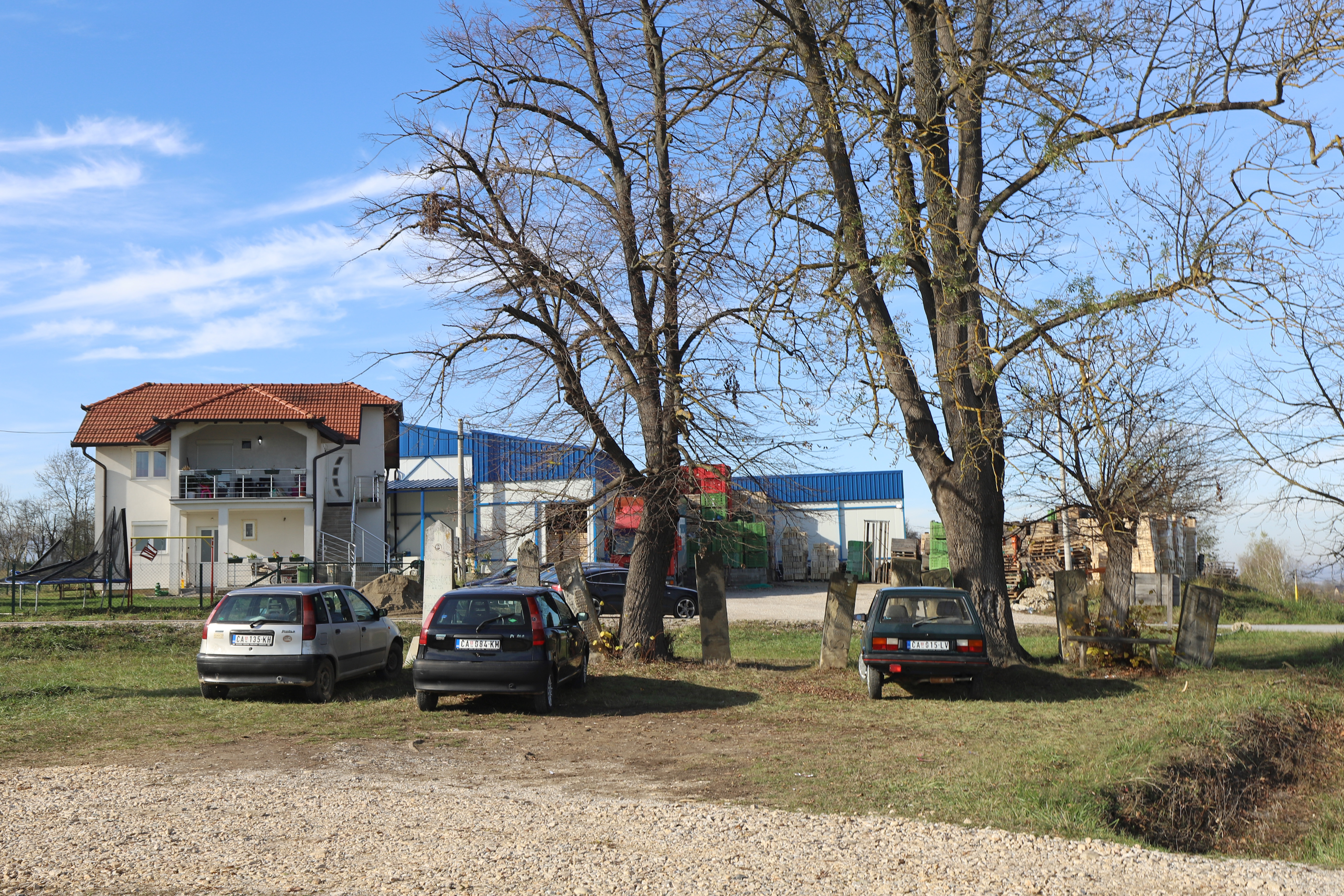
- Lipnica in 2023

- Location within Serbia
- Coordinates: 43°48′51″N 20°26′52″E
- Country: Serbia
- District: Moravica District
- Municipality: Čačak

Area
  - Total: 9.23 km^{2} (3.56 sq mi)
- Elevation: 232 m (761 ft)

Population (2022)
  - Total: 478
  - Density: 51.8/km^{2} (134/sq mi)
- Time zone: UTC+1 (CET)
  - Summer (DST): UTC+2 (CEST)
- Postal code: 32222
- Area code: +381(0)32

Lipnica (Serbian Cyrillic: Липница) is a village in the municipality of Čačak, Serbia. According to the 2022 census, the village has a population of 478 people.
