= Vujetinci =

- Village
- Location within Serbia
- Coordinates: 43°56′N 20°32′E
- Country: Serbia
- District: Moravica District
- Municipality: Čačak

Area
  - Total: 10.59 km^{2} (4.09 sq mi)
- Elevation: 642 m (2,106 ft)

Population (2011)
  - Total: 395
  - Density: 37.3/km^{2} (96.6/sq mi)
- Time zone: UTC+1 (CET)
  - Summer (DST): UTC+2 (CEST)

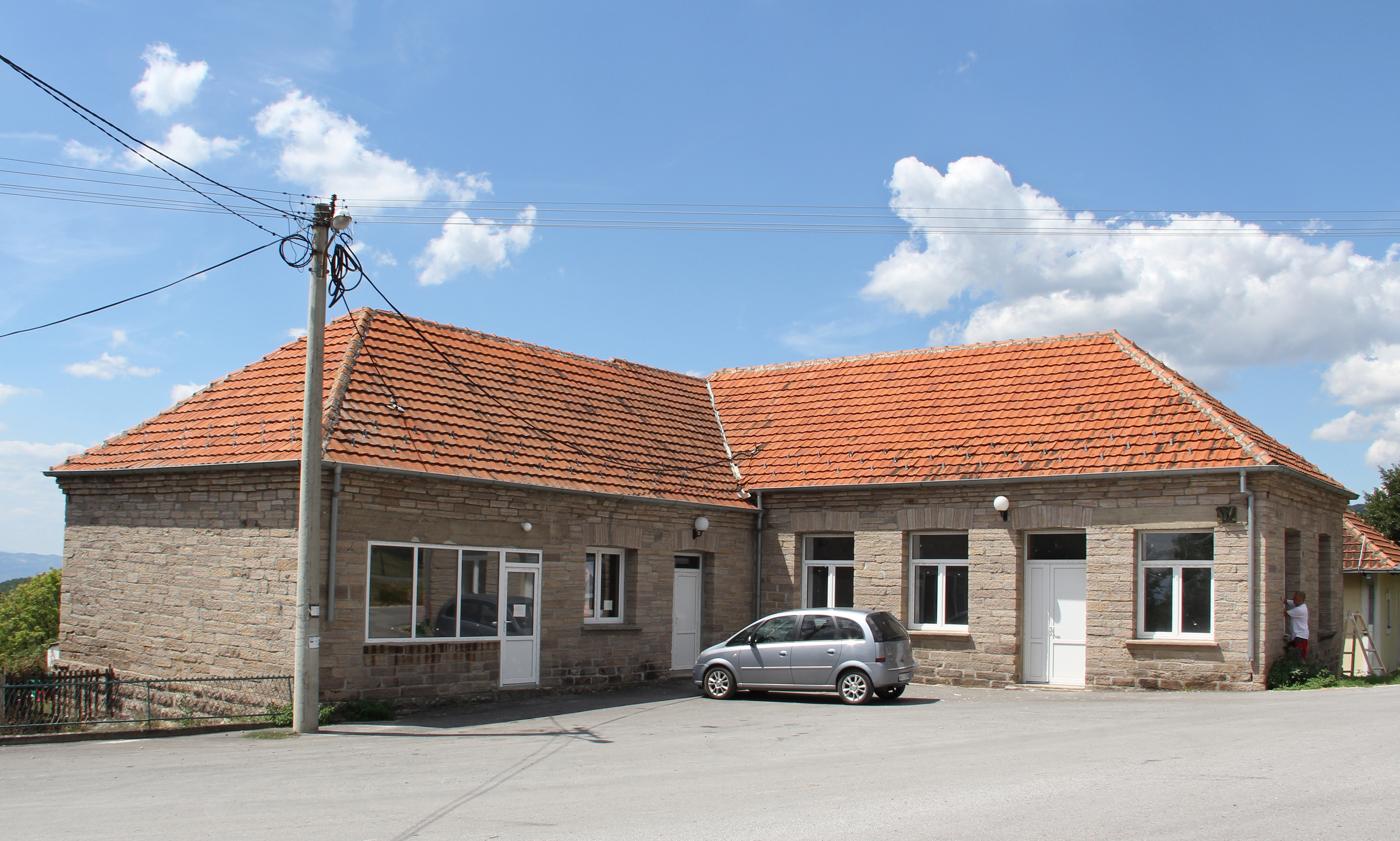

Vujetinci is a village in the municipality of Čačak, Serbia. According to the 2011 census, the village has a population of 395 people.
