= Parmenac =

- Village
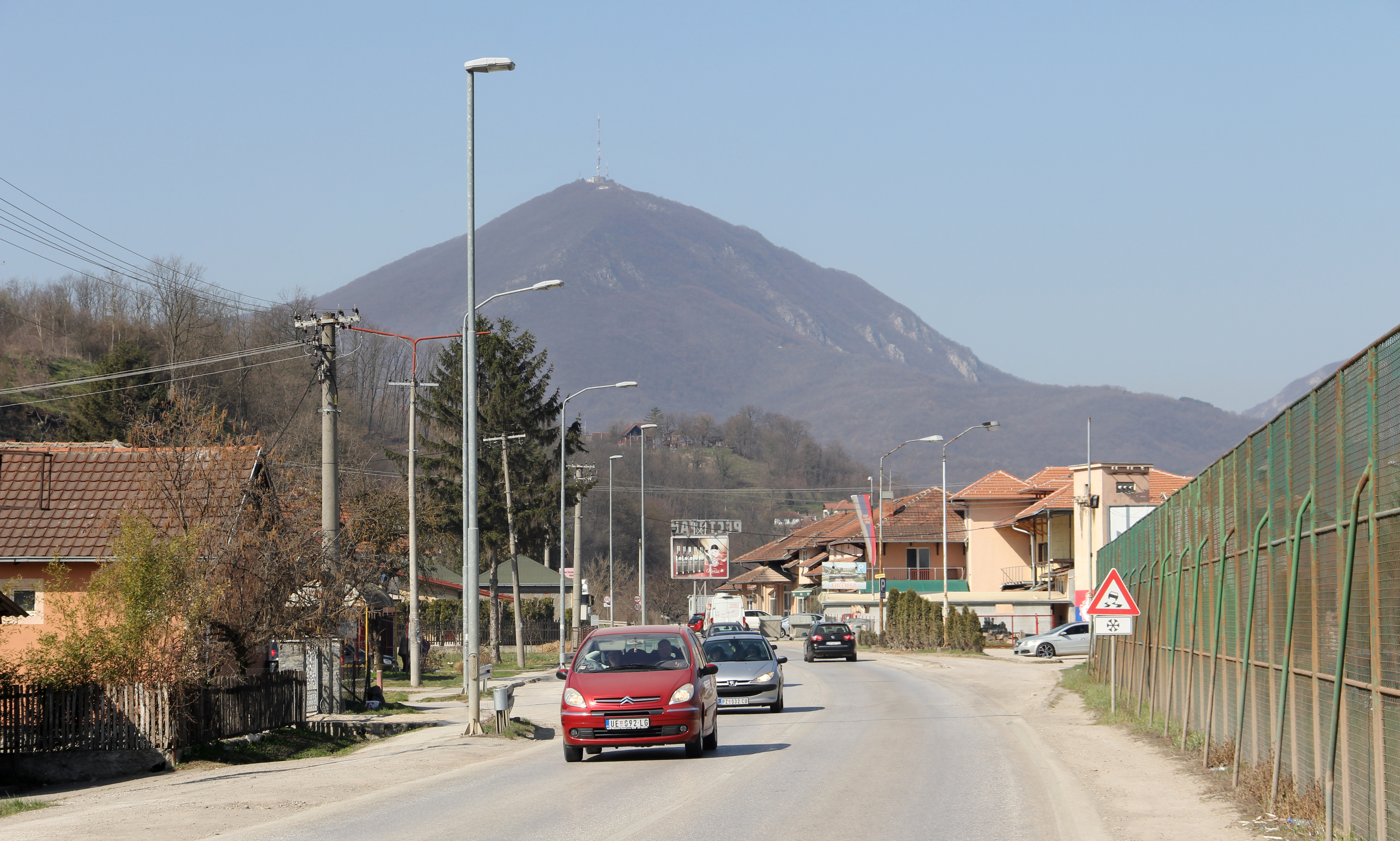
- Cars on a road in Parmenac

- Location within Serbia
- Coordinates: 43°53′42″N 20°17′28″E
- Country: Serbia
- District: Moravica District
- Municipality: Čačak

Area
  - Total: 2.90 km^{2} (1.12 sq mi)
- Elevation: 358 m (1,175 ft)

Population (2011)
  - Total: 744
  - Density: 257/km^{2} (664/sq mi)
- Time zone: UTC+1 (CET)
  - Summer (DST): UTC+2 (CEST)

Parmenac is a village in the municipality of Čačak, Serbia. According to the 2011 census, the village has a population of 744 people.
