= Viljuša =

- Village
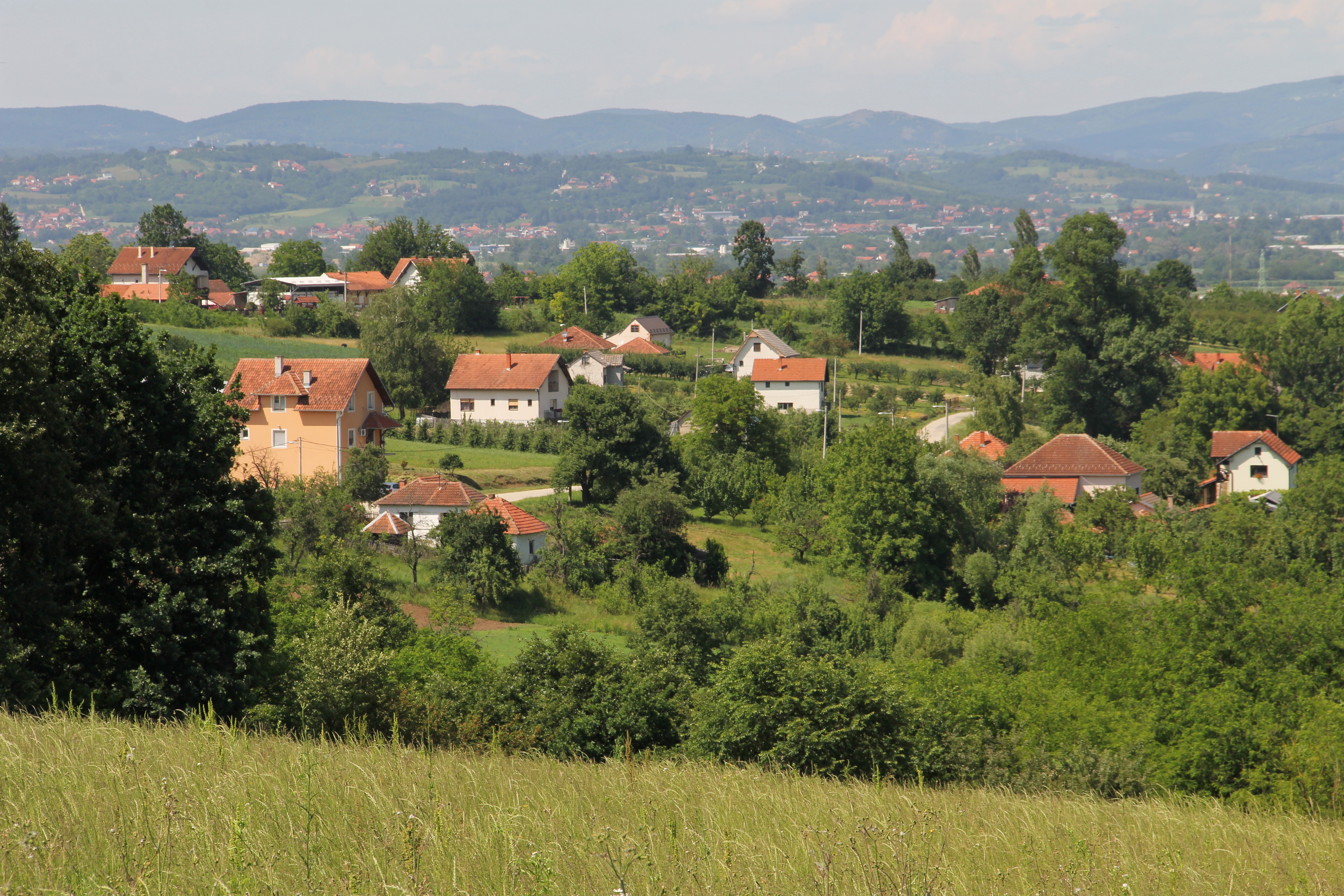

- Location within Serbia
- Coordinates: 43°50′10″N 20°24′10″E
- Country: Serbia
- District: Moravica District
- Municipality: Čačak

Area
  - Total: 8.25 km^{2} (3.19 sq mi)
- Elevation: 290 m (950 ft)

Population (2011)
  - Total: 920
  - Density: 110/km^{2} (290/sq mi)
- Time zone: UTC+1 (CET)
  - Summer (DST): UTC+2 (CEST)

Viljuša is a village in the municipality of Čačak, Serbia. According to the 2011 census, the village has a population of 920 people.
