= Dušan Đorđević =

Dušan Đorđević may refer to:

- Dušan Đorđević (basketball) (born 1983), Serbian basketball player
- Dušan Đorđević (footballer, born 1996), Serbian football defender
- Dušan Đorđević (footballer, born 1970), Serbian football manager and former player
