= Donja Trepča =

Donja Trepča may refer to:

- Donja Trepča, Serbia, a village near Čačak
- Donja Trepča, Nikšić, a village in Nikšić municipality, Montenegro
