= Milićevci =

- Village
- Location within Serbia
- Coordinates: 43°57′24″N 20°20′24″E
- Country: Serbia
- District: Moravica District
- Municipality: Čačak

Area
  - Total: 22.64 km^{2} (8.74 sq mi)
- Elevation: 334 m (1,096 ft)

Population (2011)
  - Total: 821
  - Density: 36.3/km^{2} (93.9/sq mi)
- Time zone: UTC+1 (CET)
  - Summer (DST): UTC+2 (CEST)

Milićevci (Serbian Cyrillic: Милићевци) is a village in the municipality of Čačak, Serbia. According to the 2011 census, the village has a population of 821 people.
