= Rakova (Čačak) =

Coordinates: 43°56′03″N 20°22′09″E

- Village
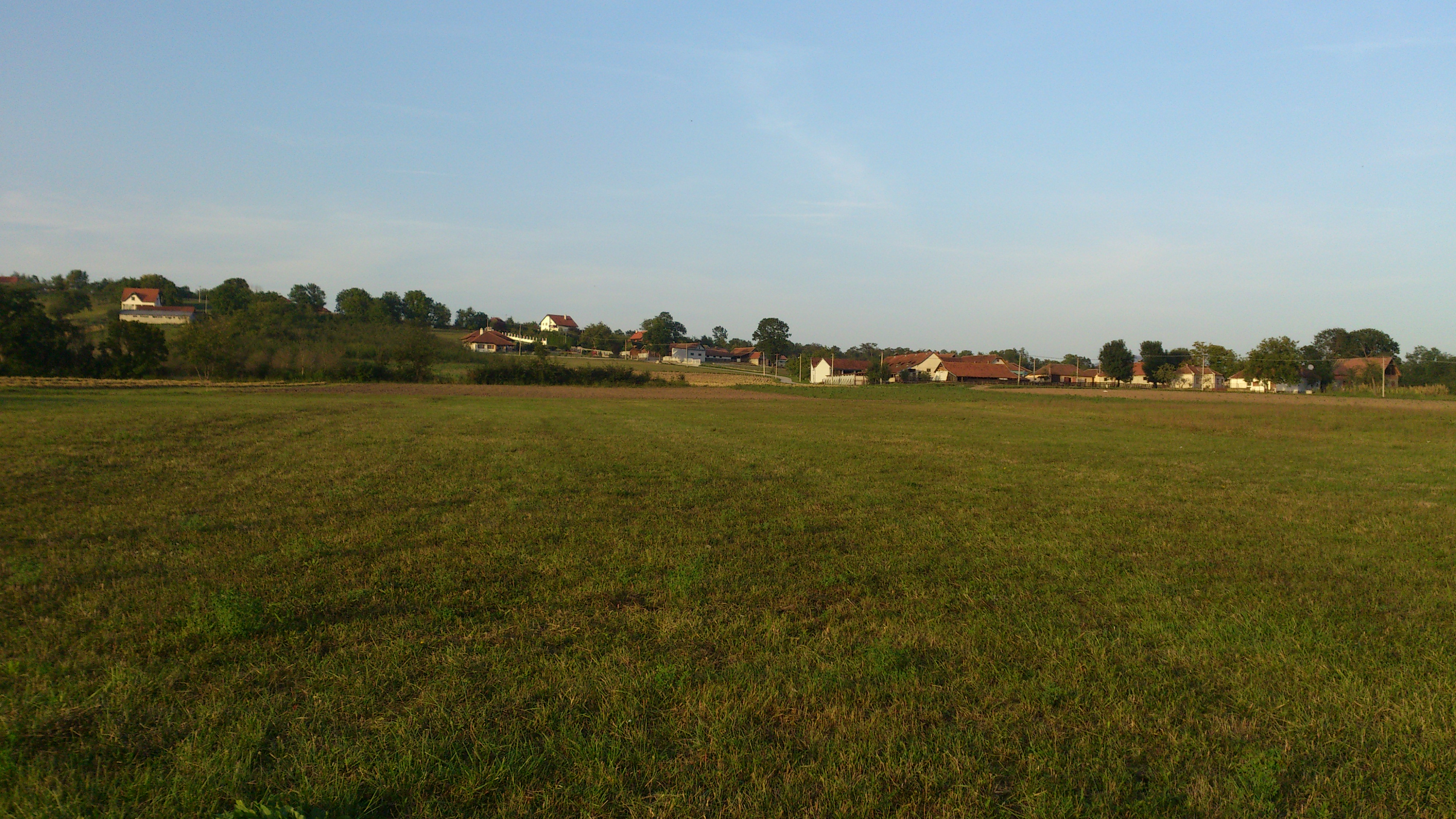
- View of fields and houses in the village of Rakova
- Interactive map of Rakova
- Country: Serbia
- District: Moravica District
- Municipality: Čačak

Area
  - Total: 9.39 km^{2} (3.63 sq mi)
- Elevation: 311 m (1,020 ft)

Population (2011)
  - Total: 661
  - Density: 70.4/km^{2} (182/sq mi)
- Time zone: UTC+1 (CET)
  - Summer (DST): UTC+2 (CEST)

Rakova is a village in the municipality of Čačak, Serbia. According to the 2011 census, the village has a population of 661 people. Rakova have river Čemernica, which Is full of beautiful nature. The name Rakova originated from the river Čemernica, because Čemernica had a lot of "rakova", or in English crayfish
