= Baluga (Trnavska) =

Baluga Балуга Zablaćka Baluga, Baluga Trnavska
- Village
- Location within Serbia
- Coordinates: 43°51′34″N 20°24′58″E
- Country: Serbia
- District: Moravica District
- Municipality: Čačak

Area
  - Total: 5.29 km^{2} (2.04 sq mi)
- Elevation: 207 m (679 ft)

Population (2011)
  - Total: 726
  - Density: 137/km^{2} (355/sq mi)
- Time zone: UTC+1 (CET)
  - Summer (DST): UTC+2 (CEST)

Baluga (Serbian Cyrillic: Балуга), also known as Zablaćka Baluga (Заблаћка Балуга) and Baluga Trnavska (Балуга Трнавска), is a village in the municipality of Čačak, Serbia. According to the 2011 census, the village has a population of 726 people.
