= Brđani (Gornji Milanovac) =

Brđani Брђани
- Village

- Location within Serbia
- Coordinates: 43°58′09″N 20°25′03″E
- Country: Serbia
- District: Moravica District
- Municipality: Gornji Milanovac

Population (2002)
  - Total: 1,227
- Time zone: UTC+1 (CET)
  - Summer (DST): UTC+2 (CEST)

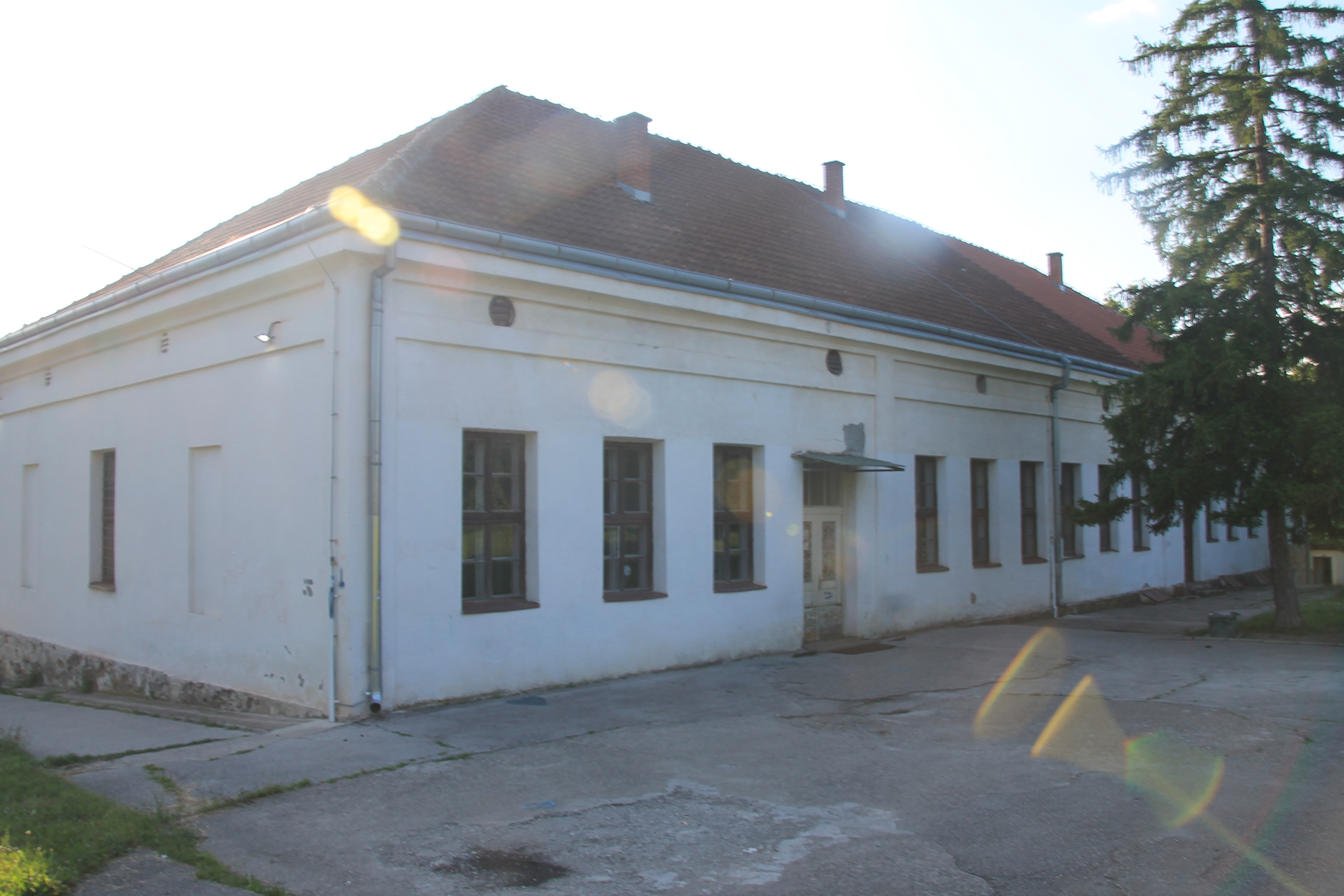
Brđani - school

Brđani is a village in the municipality of Gornji Milanovac, Serbia. According to the 2002 census, the village has a population of 1227 people.
