= Sokolići =

- Village
- Location within Serbia
- Coordinates: 43°56′26″N 20°23′37″E
- Country: Serbia
- District: Moravica District
- Municipality: Čačak

Area
  - Total: 4.29 km^{2} (1.66 sq mi)
- Elevation: 228 m (748 ft)

Population (2011)
  - Total: 160
  - Density: 37/km^{2} (97/sq mi)
- Time zone: UTC+1 (CET)
  - Summer (DST): UTC+2 (CEST)

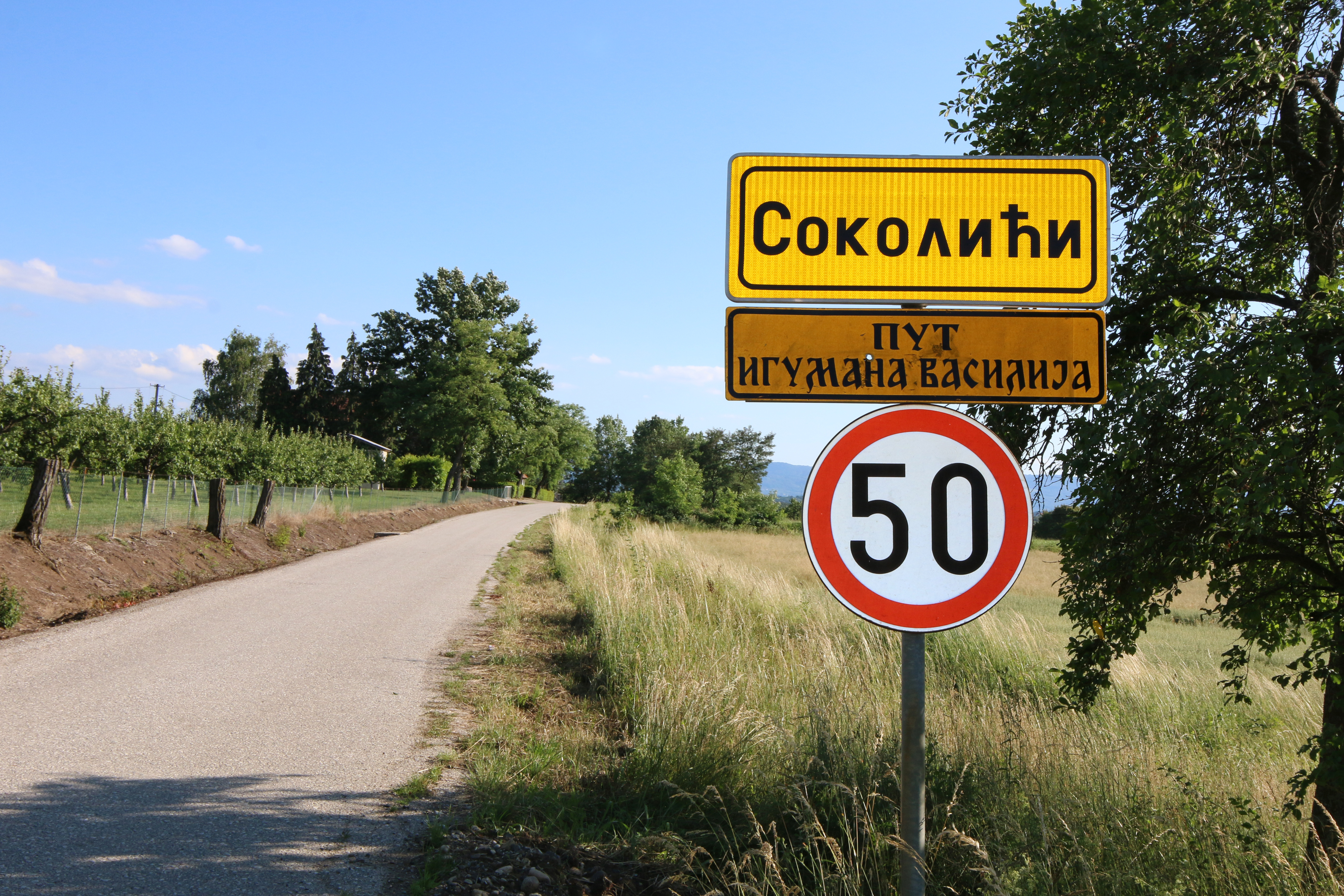

Sokolići is a village in the municipality of Čačak, Serbia. According to the 2011 census, the village has a population of 160 people.
