= Dušan Đorđević (footballer, born 1996) =

Serbian footballer

Personal information
- Full name: Dušan Đorđević
- Date of birth: 25 June 1996 (age 30)
- Place of birth: Priština, FR Yugoslavia
- Position: Right-back

Youth career
- Borac Čačak

Senior career*
Years	Team	Apps	(Gls)
2015–2017	Borac Čačak	3	(0)
2015–2017	→ Polet Ljubić (loan)	32	(0)
2018	Sloga Kraljevo	8	(0)
2018–2020	Železničar Pančevo		
2020–2021	Trepča		

International career^{‡}
2014	Serbia U19		
- * Club domestic league appearances and goals as of 16 August 2018 ‡ National team caps and goals as of 27 May 2016

Dušan Đorđević (Serbian Cyrillic: Душан Ђорђевић; also transliterated Dušan Djordjević; born 25 June 1996) is a Serbian footballer who plays as a defender.

== Club career ==
Coming from the youth school of Borac Čačak, Đorđević also started his senior career with the club. He joined the first team during the spring half of 2013–14 Serbian First League season. After Borac made promotion in the Serbian SuperLiga, Đorđević trained with the first team, but stayed with youth team until the end of 2014–15 season. After the end of his youth career, he was loaned to Polet Ljubić on dual registration for the 2015–16 season. Đorđević made his Serbian SuperLiga debut in last fixture of the 2015–16 season, played on 21 May 2015. Later, in early 2017, Đorđević also extended his loan at Polet Ljubić, where he spent the whole year. At the beginning of 2018, six months before the end of contract with the club, Đorđević mutually terminated the contract with Borac and left the club as a free agent.

At the beginning of 2018, Đorđević joined Morava Zone League side Sloga Kraljevo. In summer same year, he moved to Železničar Pančevo.

== Career statistics ==
As of 16 August 2018

Appearances and goals by club, season and competition
Club	Season	League			Cup		Continental		Other		Total	
Club	Season	Division	Apps	Goals	Apps	Goals	Apps	Goals	Apps	Goals	Apps	Goals
Borac Čačak	2013–14	Serbian First League	0	0	—		—		—		0	0
Borac Čačak	2014–15	Serbian SuperLiga	0	0	0	0	—		—		0	0
Borac Čačak	2015–16	Serbian SuperLiga	2	0	0	0	—		—		2	0
Borac Čačak	2016–17	Serbian SuperLiga	1	0	0	0	—		—		1	0
Borac Čačak	2017–18	Serbian SuperLiga	0	0	—		—		—		0	0
Borac Čačak	Total		3	0	0	0	—		—		3	0
Polet Ljubić (loan)	2015–16	Serbian League West	26	0	—		—		1 (Note: Appearance in regional cup of Šumadija and Western Serbia)	0	27	0
Polet Ljubić (loan)	2016–17	Serbian League West	0	0	—		—		—		0	0
Polet Ljubić (loan)	2017–18	Serbian League West	6	0	—		—		—		6	0
Polet Ljubić (loan)	Total		32	0	—		—		1	0	33	0
Sloga Kraljevo	2017–18	Morava Zone League	8	0	—		—		—		8	0
Železničar Pančevo	2018–19	Serbian League Vojvodina	0	0	—		—		—		0	0
Career total			43	0	0	0	—		1	0	44	0

== Personal life ==
Originating from Obilić, Đorđević was born in Priština, moving to the Central Serbia with family as a kid, during the Kosovo War. He grew up in Tavnik, a village between Kraljevo and Čačak, where he started playing football. In autumn 2016, Đorđević broke his football career to be a novice at the Zočište Monastery.
