= Bečanj =

- Village
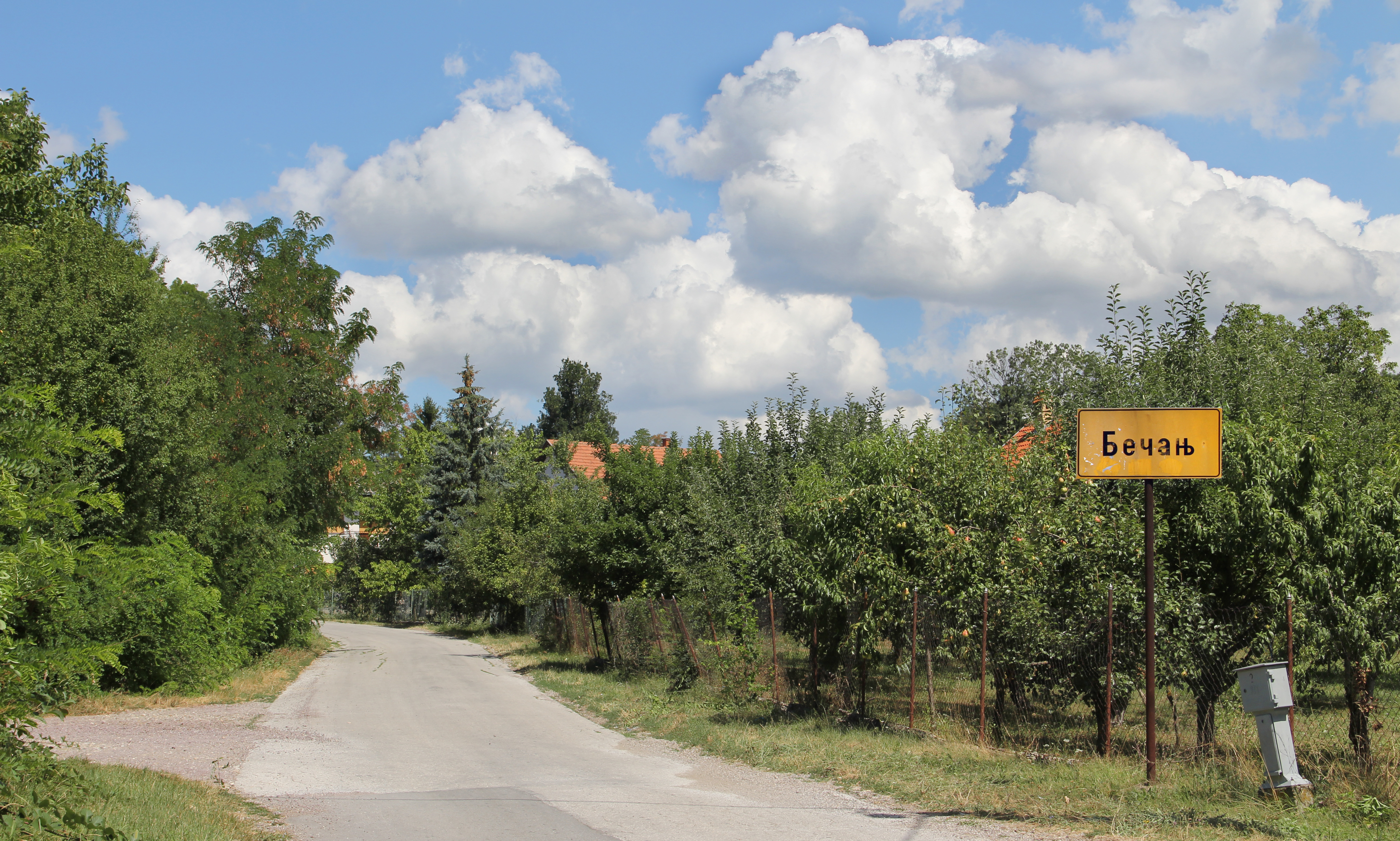
- Village of Becanj (City of Cacak), Serbia.

- Location within Serbia
- Coordinates: 43°53′05″N 20°33′16″E
- Country: Serbia
- District: Moravica District
- Municipality: Čačak

Area
  - Total: 16.60 km^{2} (6.41 sq mi)
- Elevation: 272 m (892 ft)

Population (2011)
  - Total: 921
  - Density: 55.5/km^{2} (144/sq mi)
- Time zone: UTC+1 (CET)
  - Summer (DST): UTC+2 (CEST)

Bečanj (Serbian Cyrillic: Бечањ) is a village in the municipality of Čačak, Serbia. According to the 2011 census, the village has a population of 921 people.
