= Stančići, Čačak =

Stančići
- Village
- Location within Serbia
- Coordinates: 43°52′59″N 20°26′34″E
- Country: Serbia
- District: Moravica District
- Municipality: Čačak

Area
  - Total: 3.62 km^{2} (1.40 sq mi)
- Elevation: 559 m (1,834 ft)

Population (2011)
  - Total: 331
  - Density: 91.4/km^{2} (237/sq mi)
- Time zone: UTC+1 (CET)
  - Summer (DST): UTC+2 (CEST)

Stančići is a village in the municipality of Čačak, Serbia. According to the 2011 census, the village has a population of 331 people.
