= Katrga =

- Village
- Location within Serbia
- Coordinates: 43°49′57″N 20°33′05″E
- Country: Serbia
- District: Moravica District
- Municipality: Čačak

Area
  - Total: 14.66 km^{2} (5.66 sq mi)
- Elevation: 187 m (614 ft)

Population (2011)
  - Total: 877
  - Density: 59.8/km^{2} (155/sq mi)
- Time zone: UTC+1 (CET)
  - Summer (DST): UTC+2 (CEST)

Katrga (Serbian Cyrillic: Катрга) is a village in the municipality of Čačak, Serbia. According to the 2011 census, the village has a population of 877 people.
