= Bresnica (Čačak) =

- Village
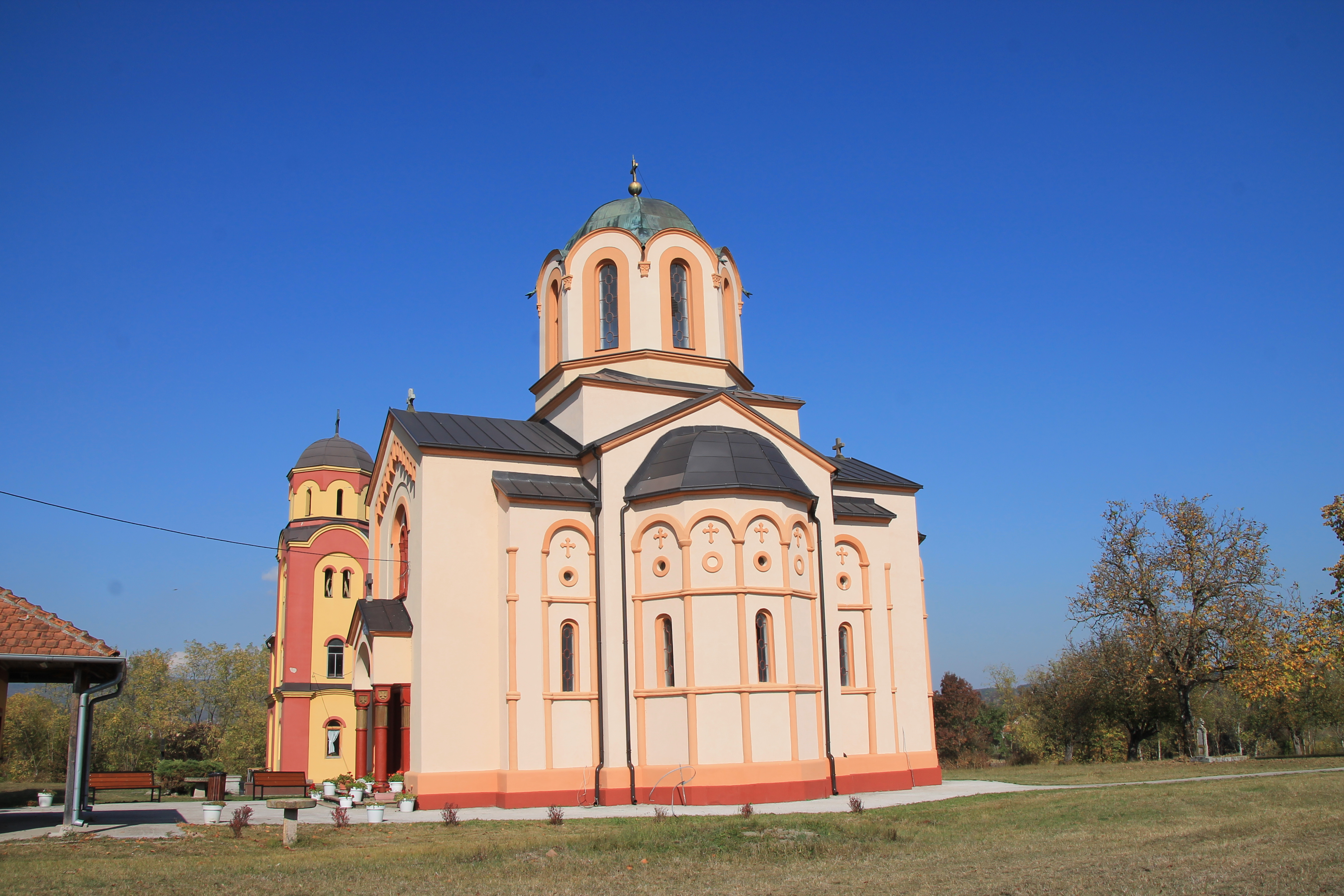
- Village Church

- Location within Serbia
- Coordinates: 43°52′27″N 20°35′26″E
- Country: Serbia
- District: Moravica District
- Municipality: Čačak

Area
  - Total: 29.22 km^{2} (11.28 sq mi)
- Elevation: 265 m (869 ft)

Population (2011)
  - Total: 1,295
  - Density: 44.32/km^{2} (114.8/sq mi)
- Time zone: UTC+1 (CET)
  - Summer (DST): UTC+2 (CEST)

Bresnica (Serbian Cyrillic: Бресница) is a village located in the municipality of Čačak, Serbia. According to the 2011 census, the village has a population of 1,295 inhabitants.
