= Dajići =

- Village
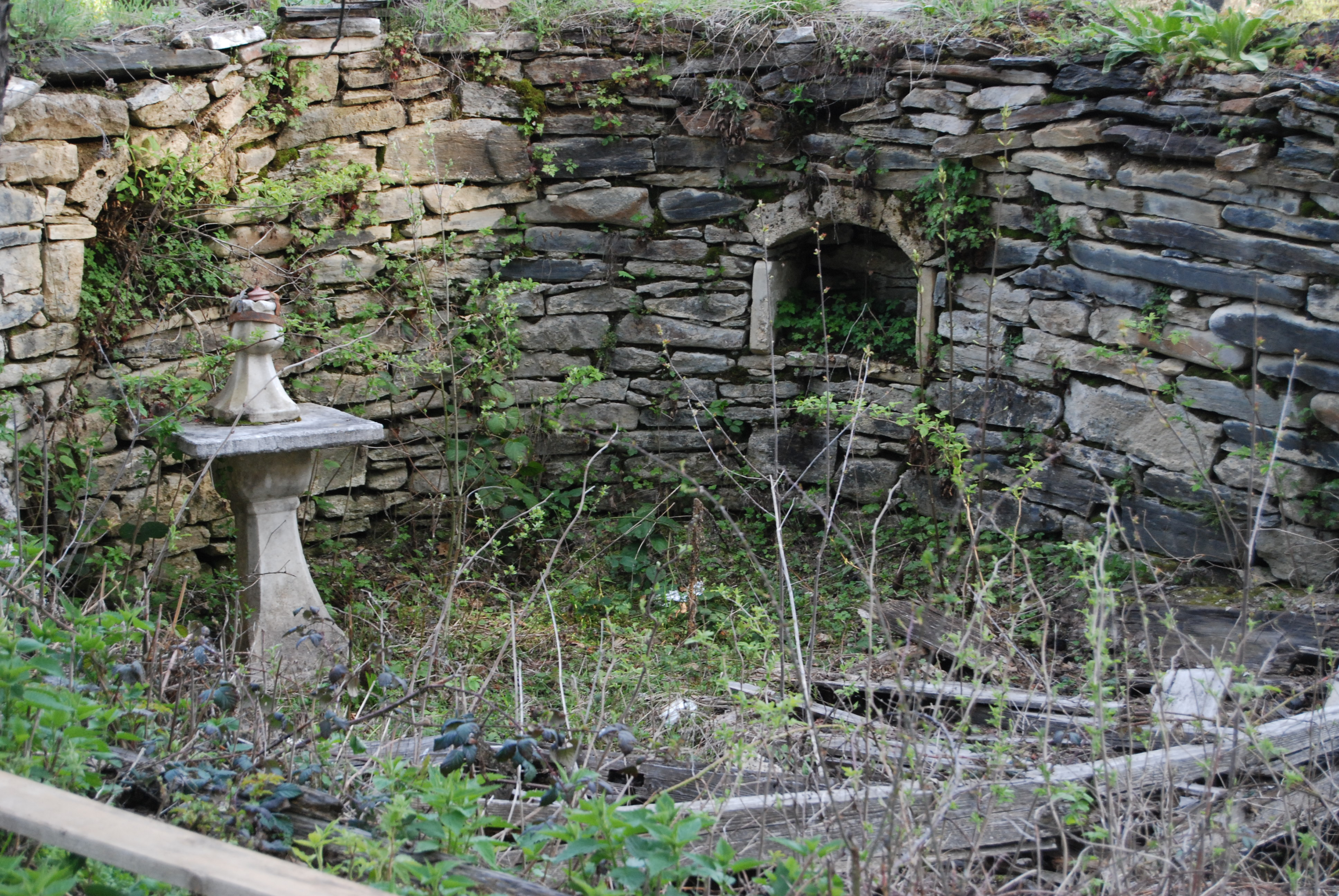
- Church of the Preobraženje located in the hamlet of Middle River, village of Dajići, municipality Ivanjica.

- Location within Serbia
- Coordinates: 43°23′45″N 20°18′35″E
- Country: Serbia
- District: Moravica District
- Municipality: Ivanjica

Area
  - Total: 53.56 km^{2} (20.68 sq mi)

Population (2011)
  - Total: 228
  - Density: 4.26/km^{2} (11.0/sq mi)
- Time zone: UTC+1 (CET)
  - Summer (DST): UTC+2 (CEST)

Dajići is a village in the municipality of Ivanjica, Serbia. According to the 2011 census, the village has a population of 228 inhabitants.
