= Jančići =

- Village
- Location within Serbia
- Coordinates: 43°57′20″N 20°09′02″E
- Country: Serbia
- District: Moravica District
- Municipality: Čačak

Area
  - Total: 13.98 km^{2} (5.40 sq mi)
- Elevation: 607 m (1,991 ft)

Population (2011)
  - Total: 143
  - Density: 10.2/km^{2} (26.5/sq mi)
- Time zone: UTC+1 (CET)
  - Summer (DST): UTC+2 (CEST)

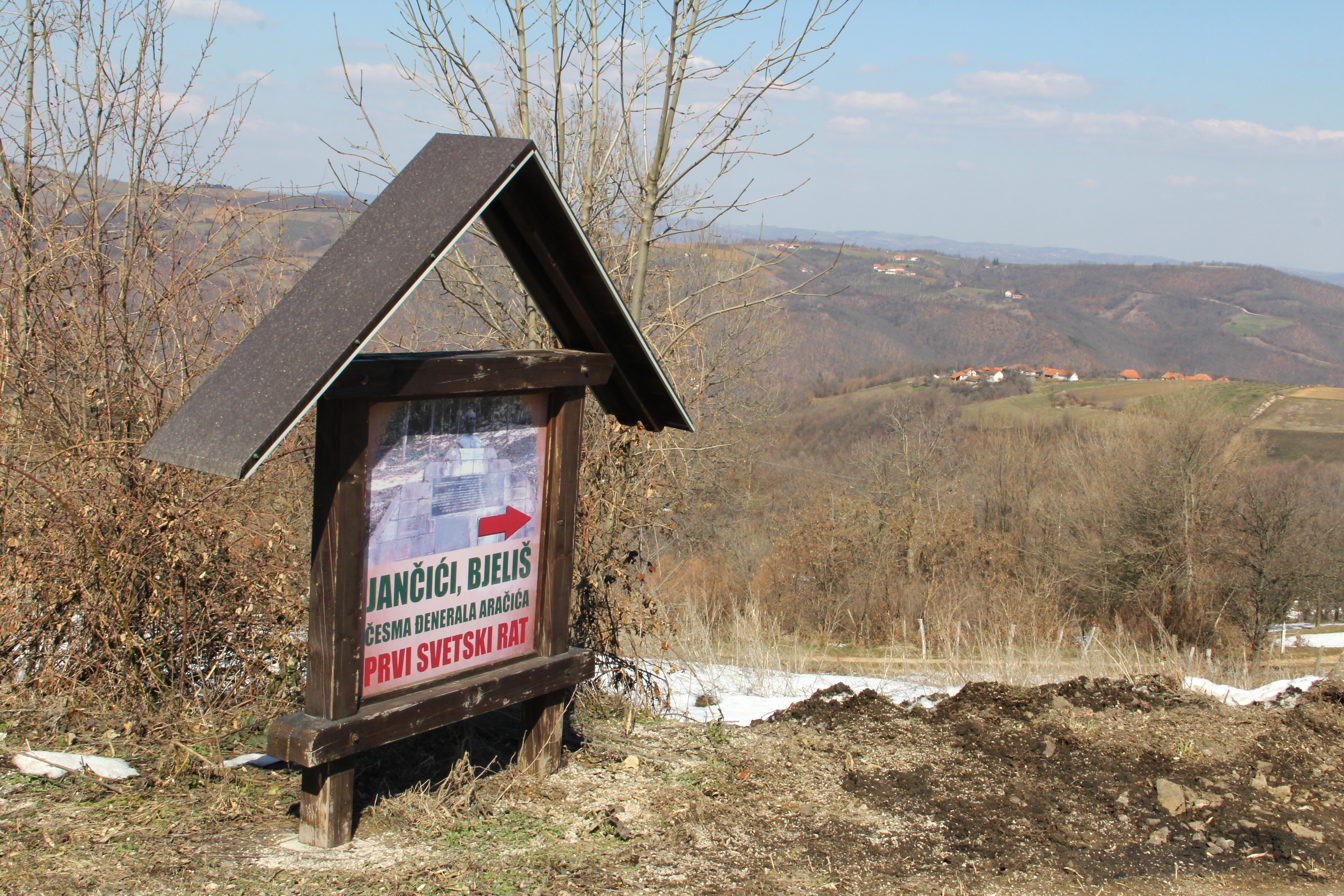

Jančići (Serbian Cyrillic: Јанчићи) is a village in the municipality of Čačak, Serbia. According to the 2011 census, the village has a population of 143 people.
