= Vrnčani (Čačak) =

Vrnčani Врнчани
- Village
- Location within Serbia
- Coordinates: 43°55′35″N 20°08′35″E
- Country: Serbia
- District: Moravica District
- Municipality: Čačak

Population (2002)
  - Total: 279
- Time zone: UTC+1 (CET)
  - Summer (DST): UTC+2 (CEST)

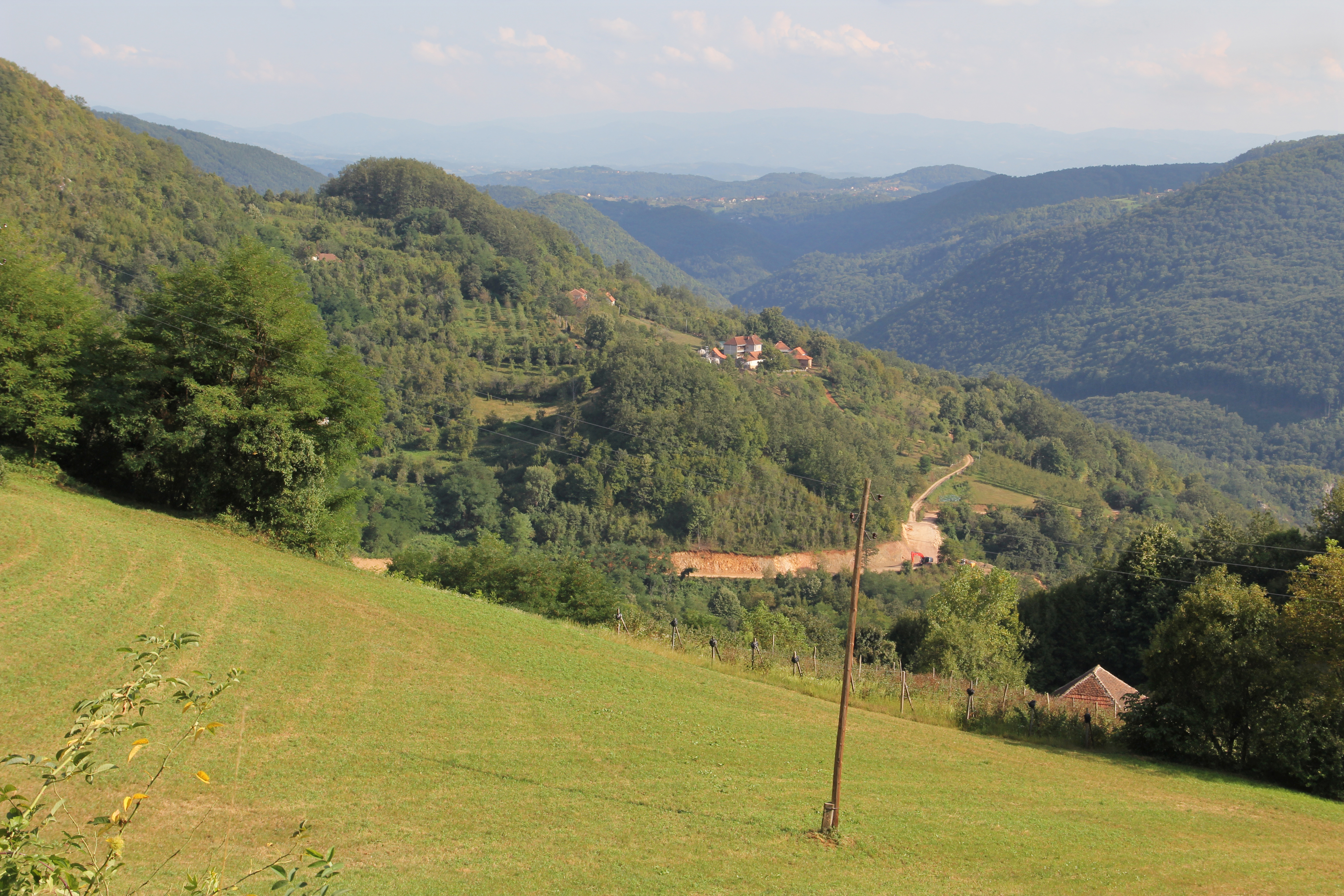
Vrnčani in 2023

Vrnčani is a village in the municipality of Čačak, Serbia. According to the 2002 census, the village has a population of 279 people.
