= Trbušani =

Trbušani Трбушани
- Village
- Location within Serbia
- Coordinates: 43°55′28″N 20°19′13″E
- Country: Serbia
- District: Moravica
- City: Čačak

Area
  - Total: 7.67 km^{2} (2.96 sq mi)
- Elevation: 255 m (837 ft)

Population (2011)
  - Total: 1,968
  - Density: 257/km^{2} (665/sq mi)
- Time zone: UTC+1 (CET)
  - Summer (DST): UTC+2 (CEST)

Trbušani (Serbian: Трбушани) is a village located in the city of Čačak, Serbia. According to the 2011 census, it has a population of 1,968 inhabitants.
