= Donja Trepča, Serbia =

Coordinates: 43.9136°N 20.4708°E

Donja Trepča
- Village
- Interactive map of Donja Trepča
- Country: Serbia
- District: Moravica District
- Municipality: Čačak

Area
  - Total: 15.40 km^{2} (5.95 sq mi)
- Elevation: 299 m (981 ft)

Population (2011)
  - Total: 989
  - Density: 64.2/km^{2} (166/sq mi)
- Time zone: UTC+1 (CET)
  - Summer (DST): UTC+2 (CEST)

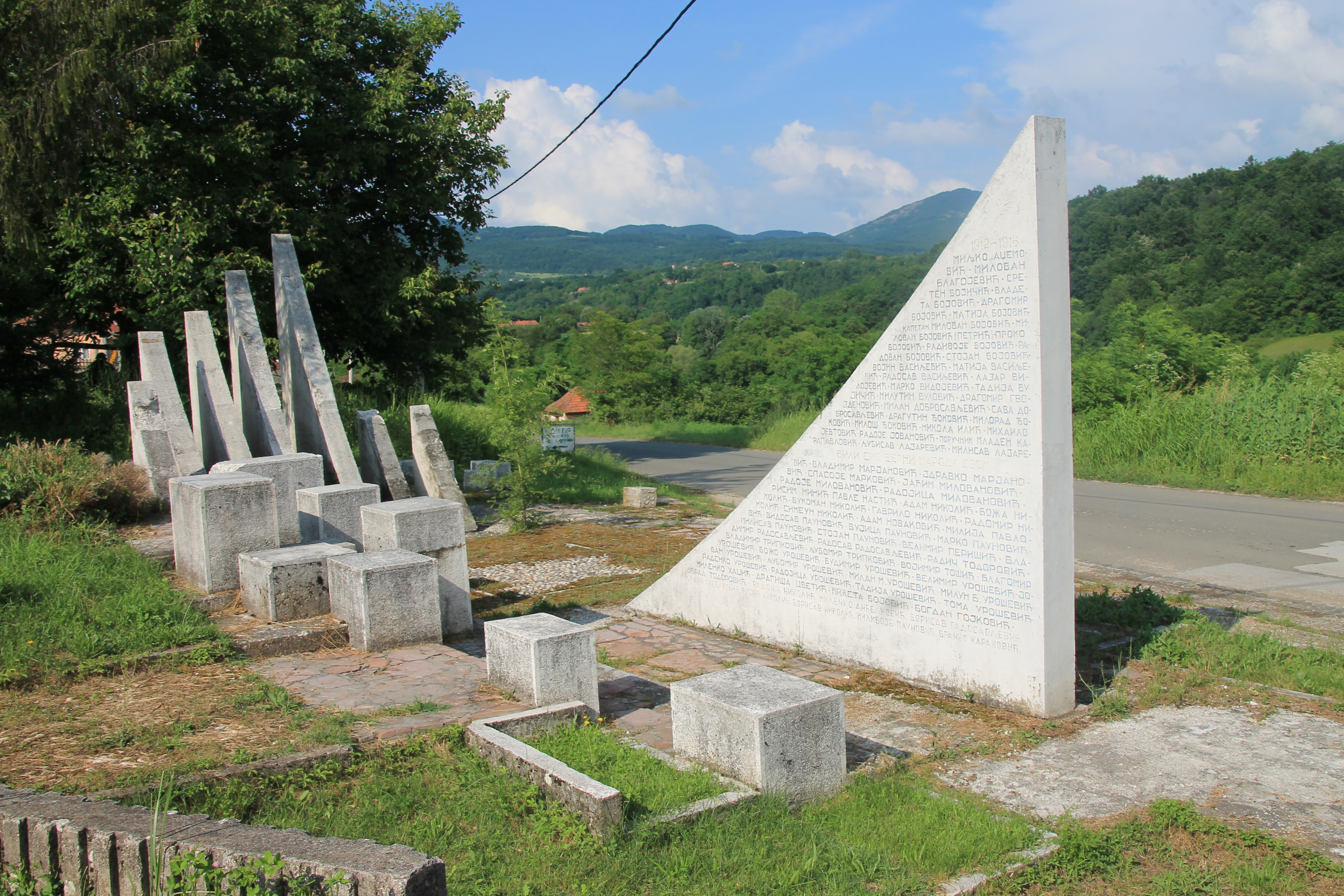

Donja Trepča (Serbian Cyrillic: Доња Трепча) is a village in the municipality of Čačak, Serbia. According to the 2011 census, the village has a population of 989 people.
