= Tavnik =

Coordinates: 43°49′N 20°35′E

Tavnik Тавник (Serbian)
- Village (Selo)
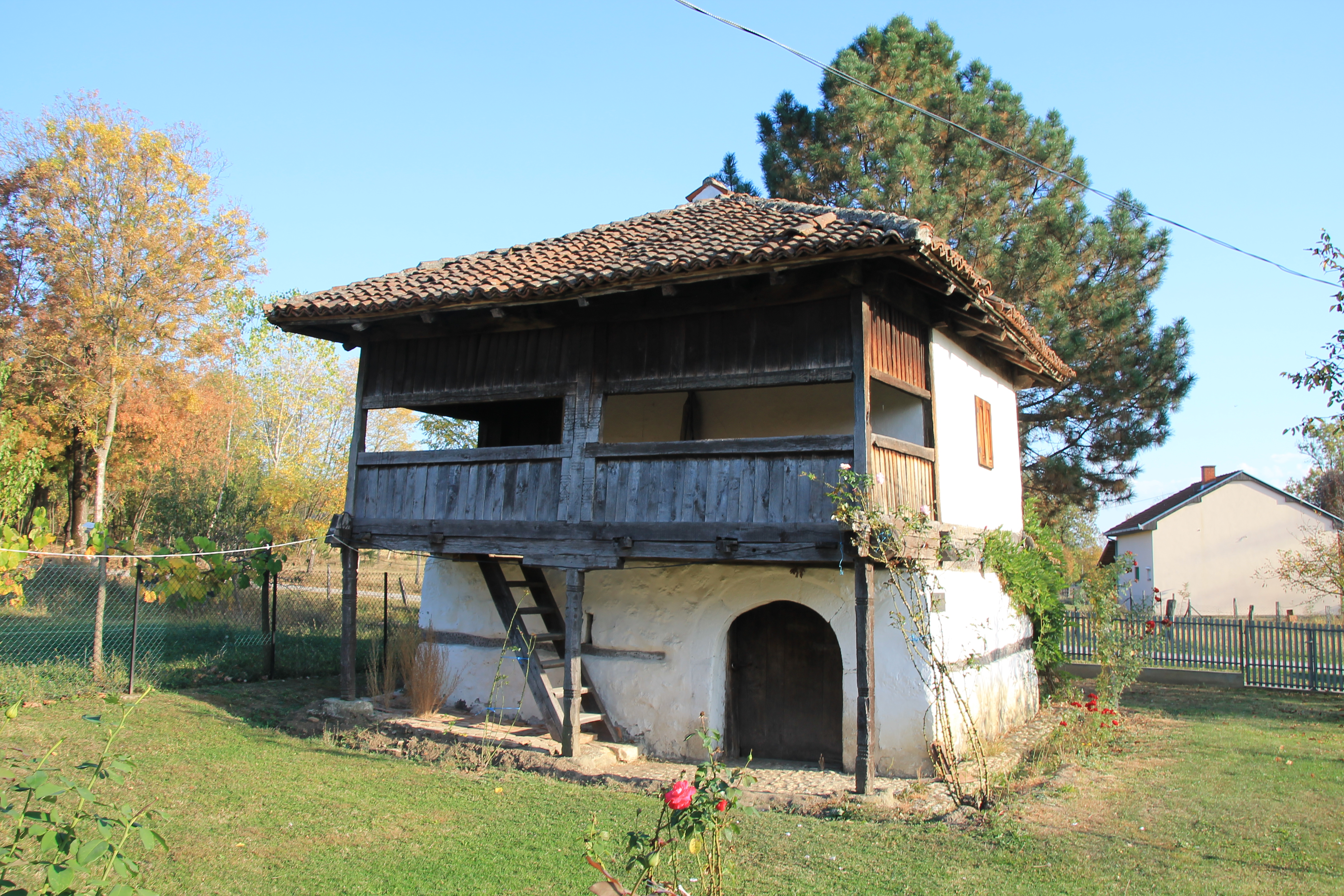
- Interactive map of Tavnik
- Country: Serbia
- Time zone: UTC+1 (CET)
  - Summer (DST): UTC+2 (CEST)

Tavnik is a village situated in Kraljevo municipality in Serbia.
