= Moravica District =

Administrative district of Serbia

Moravica District Моравички округ
- Administrative district of Serbia
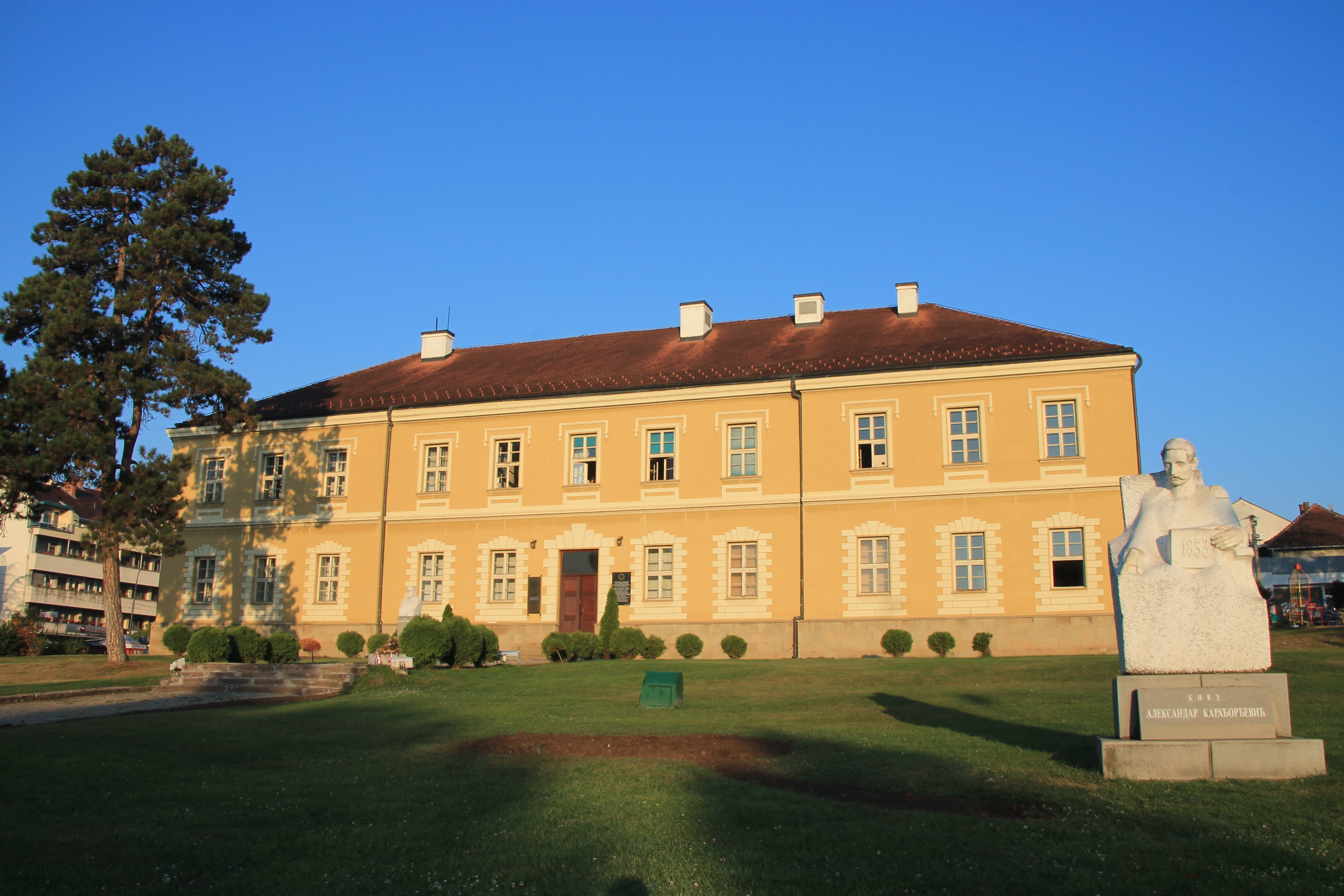
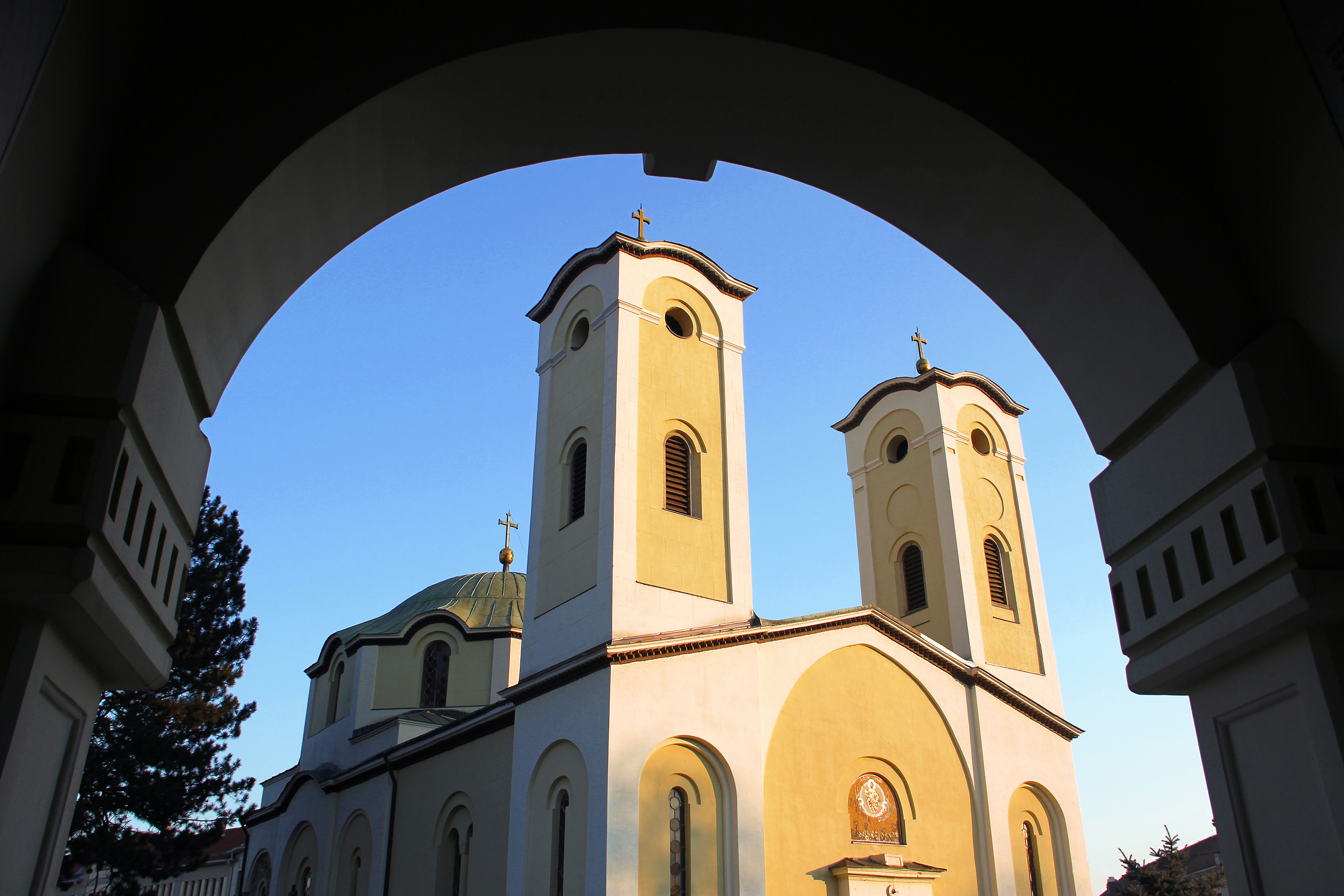
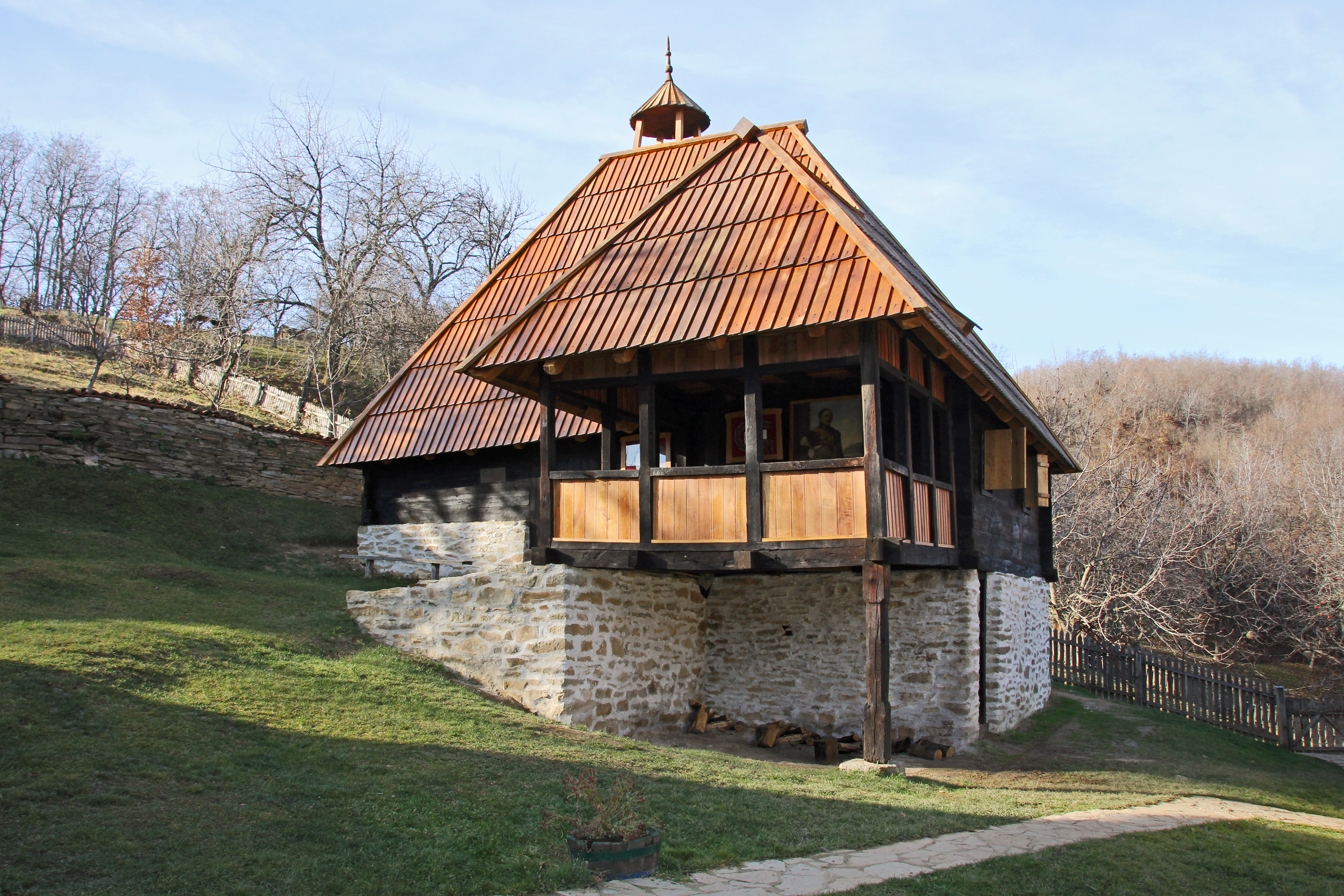
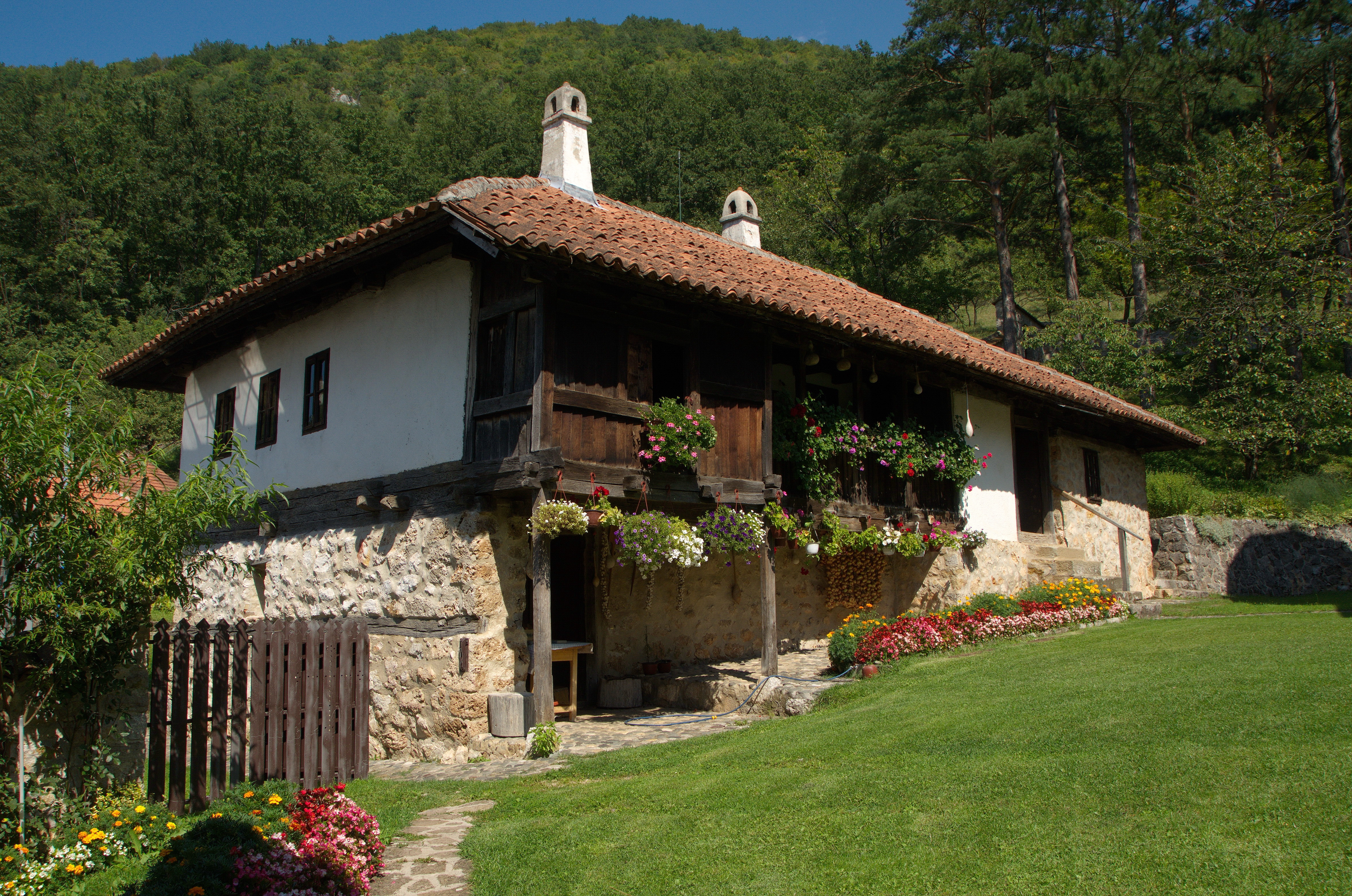
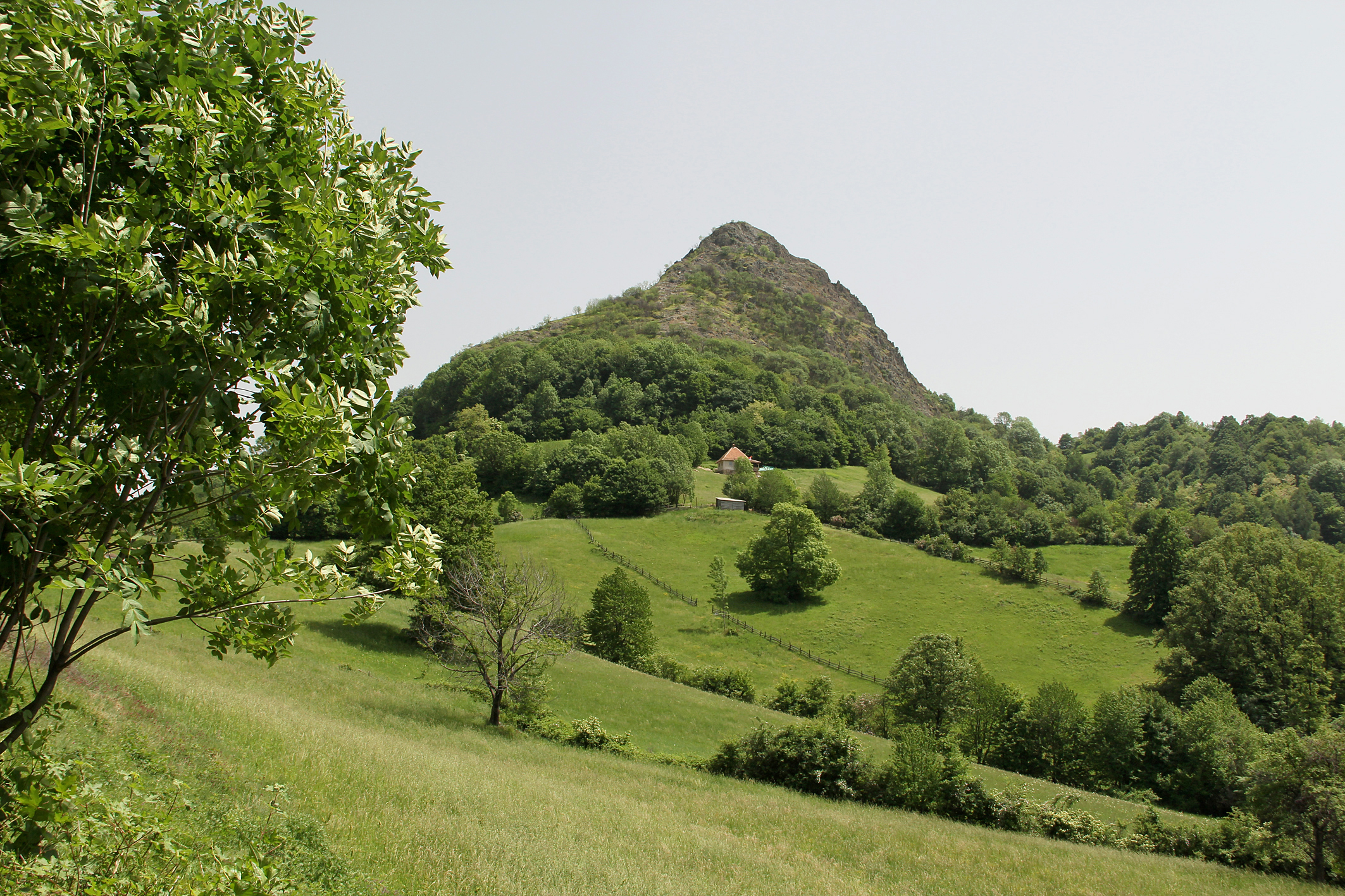
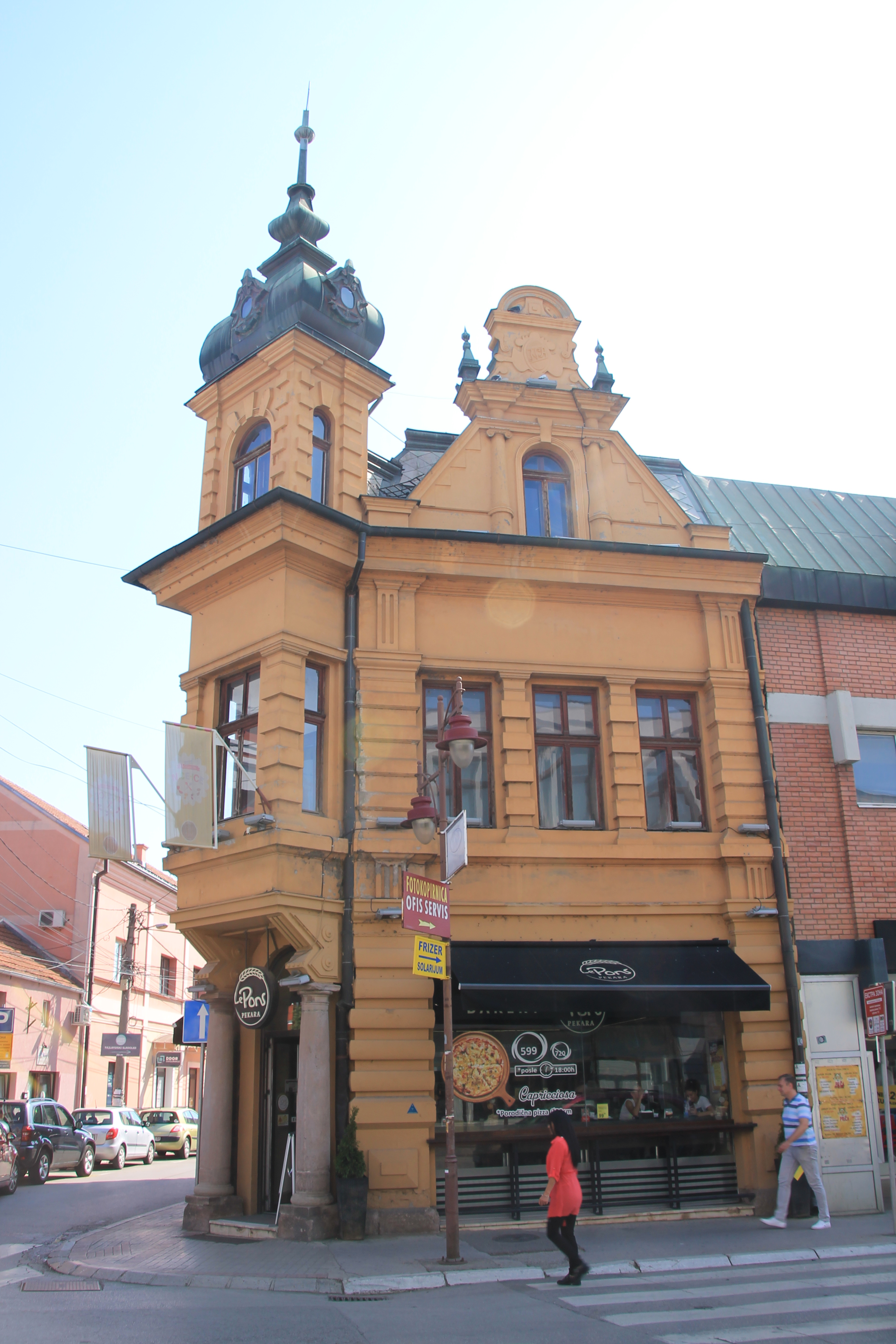
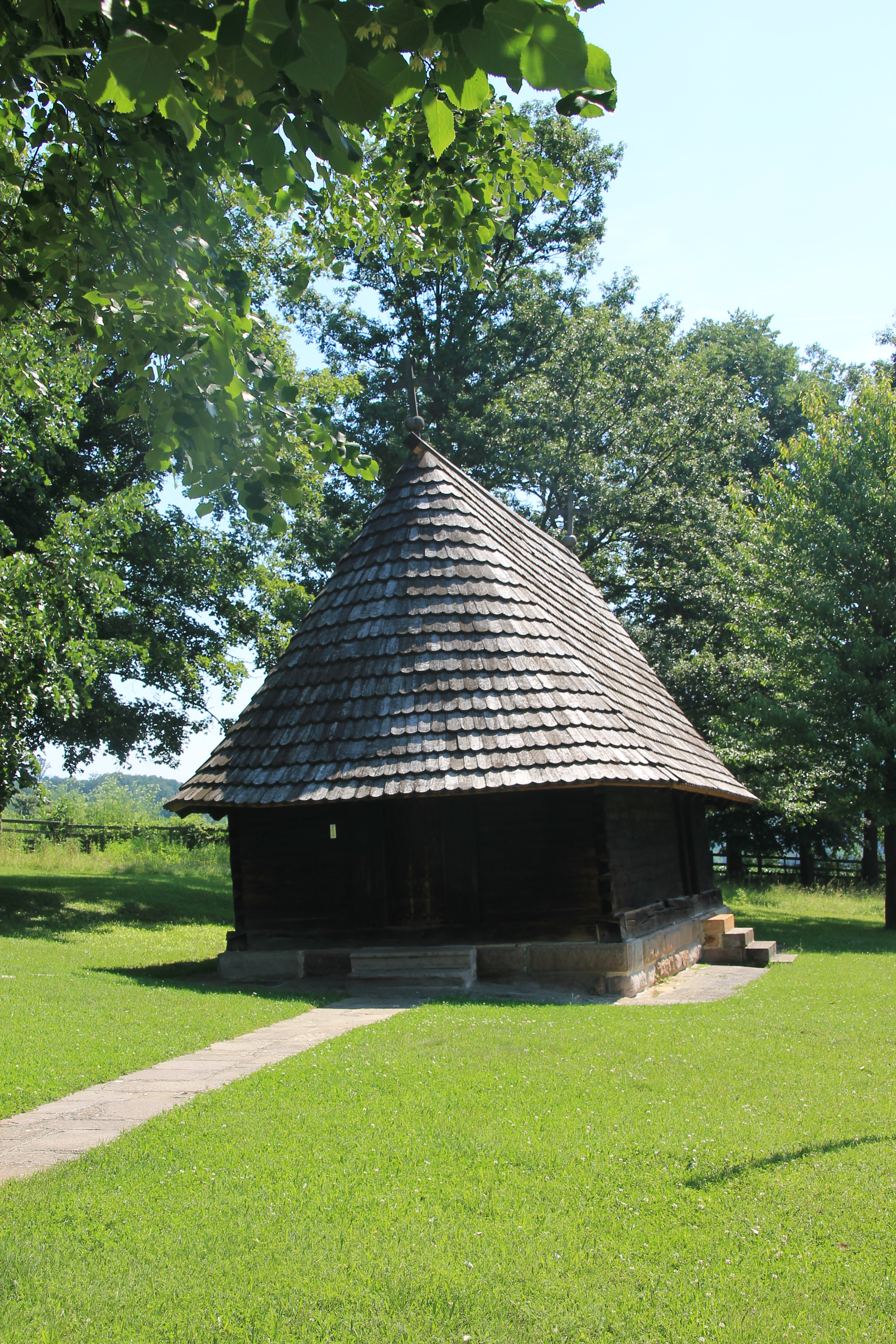
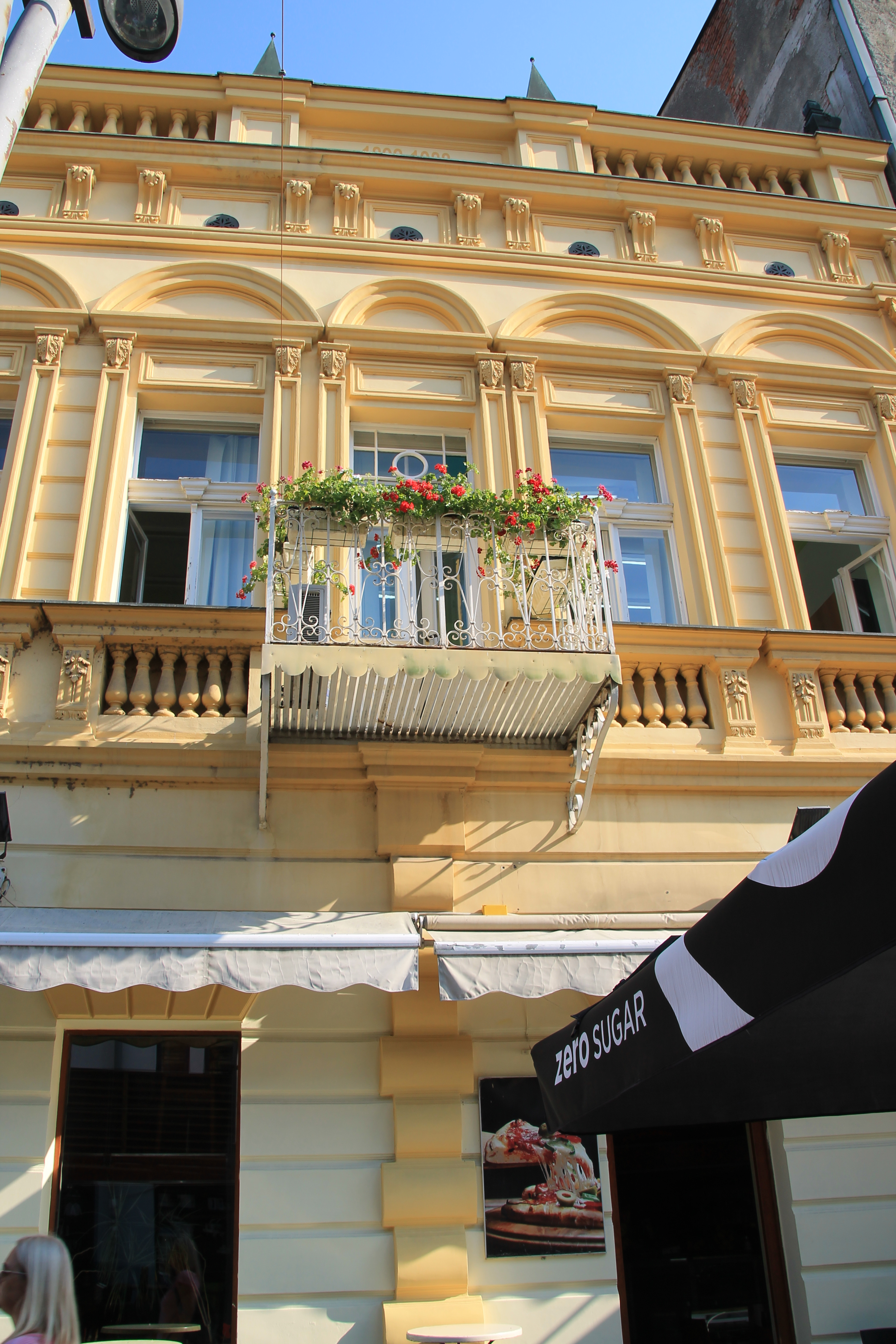
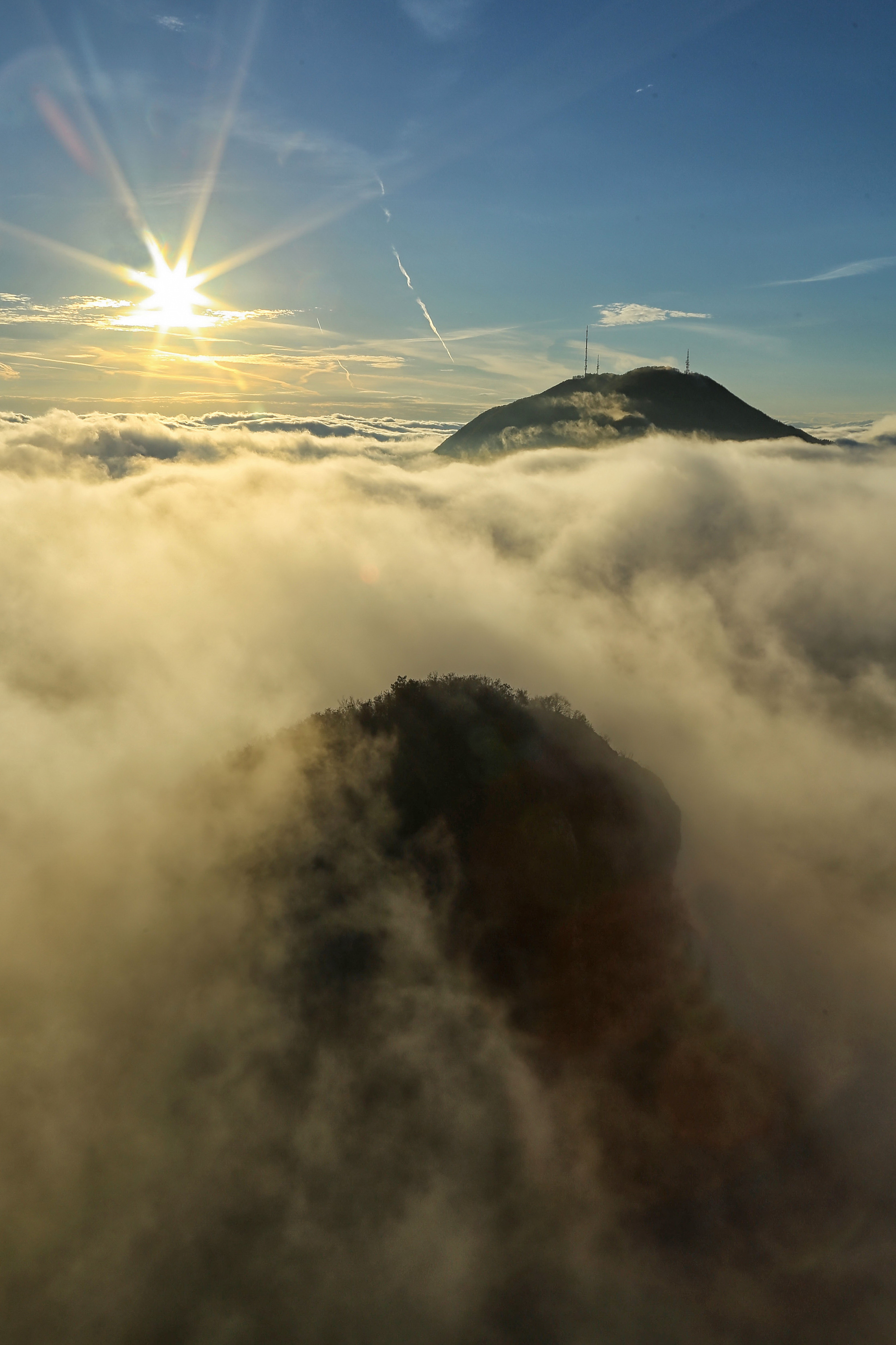
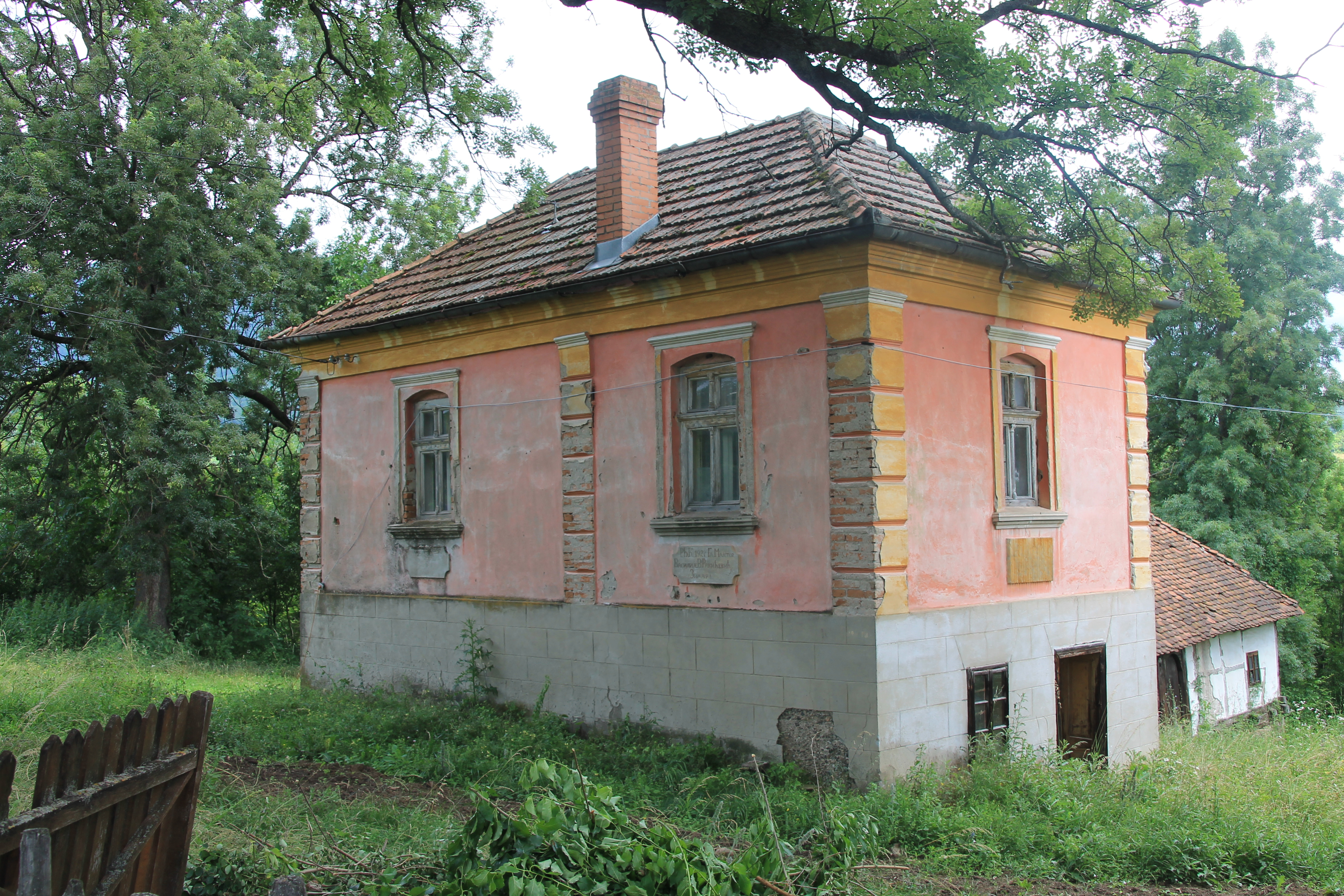
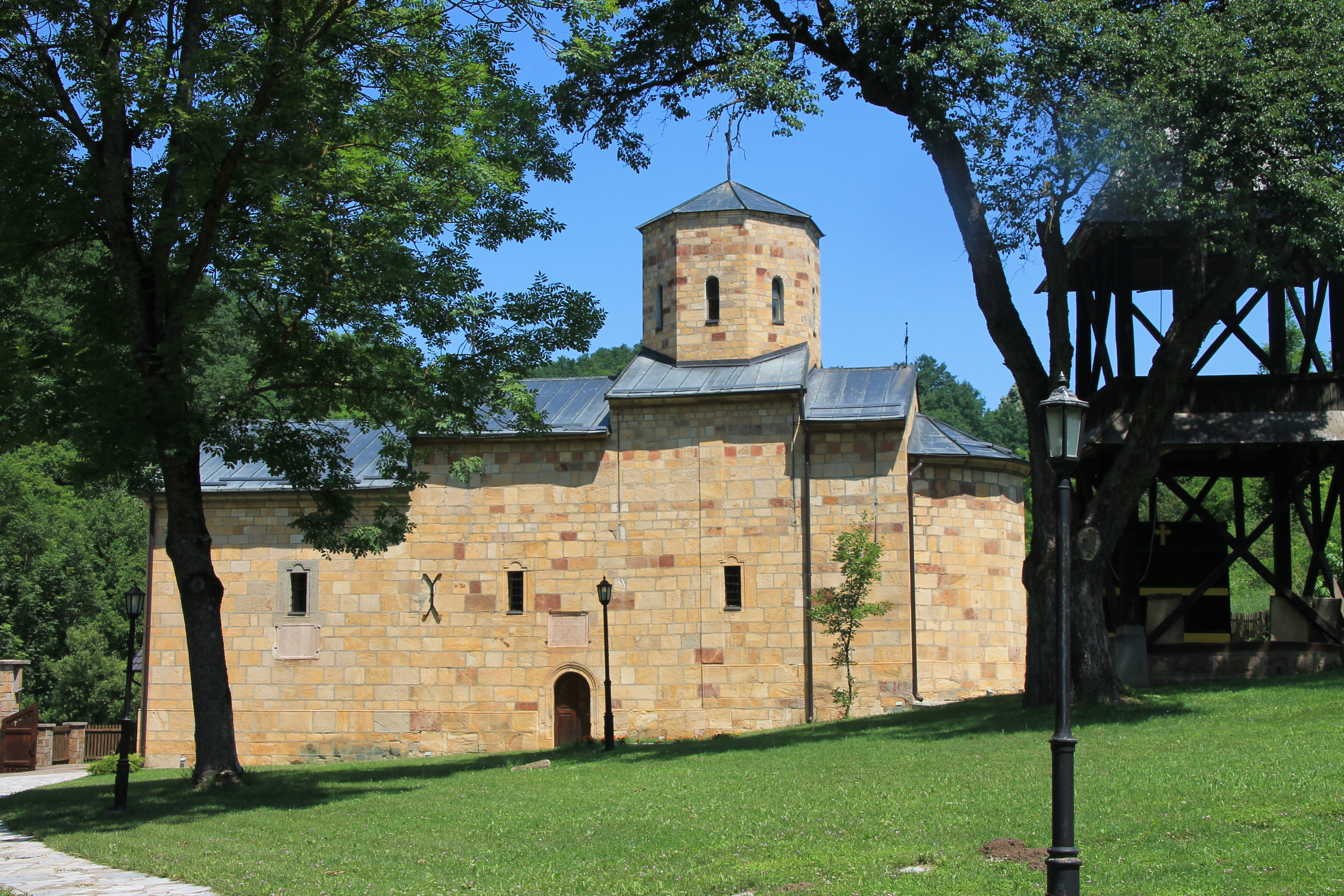
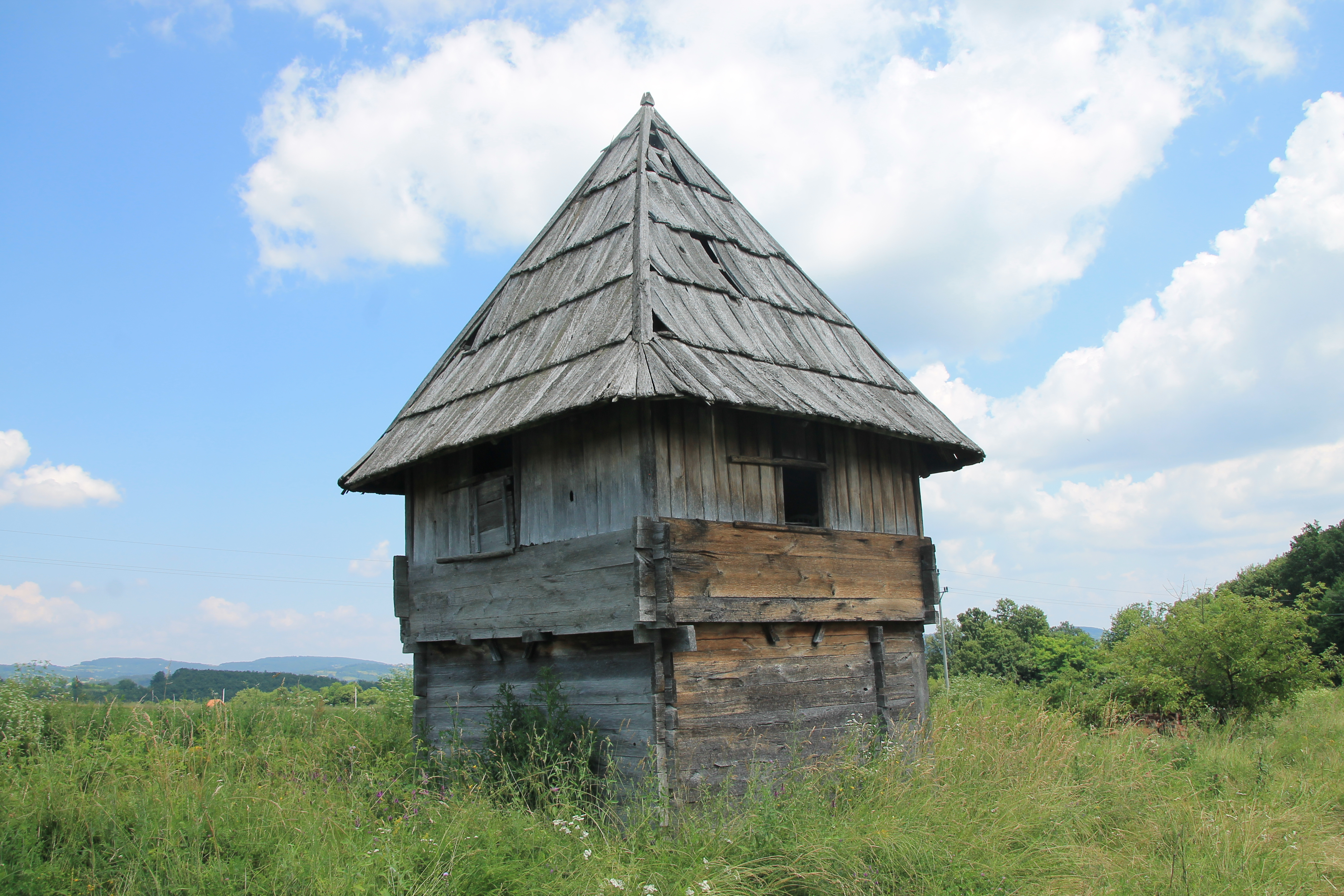
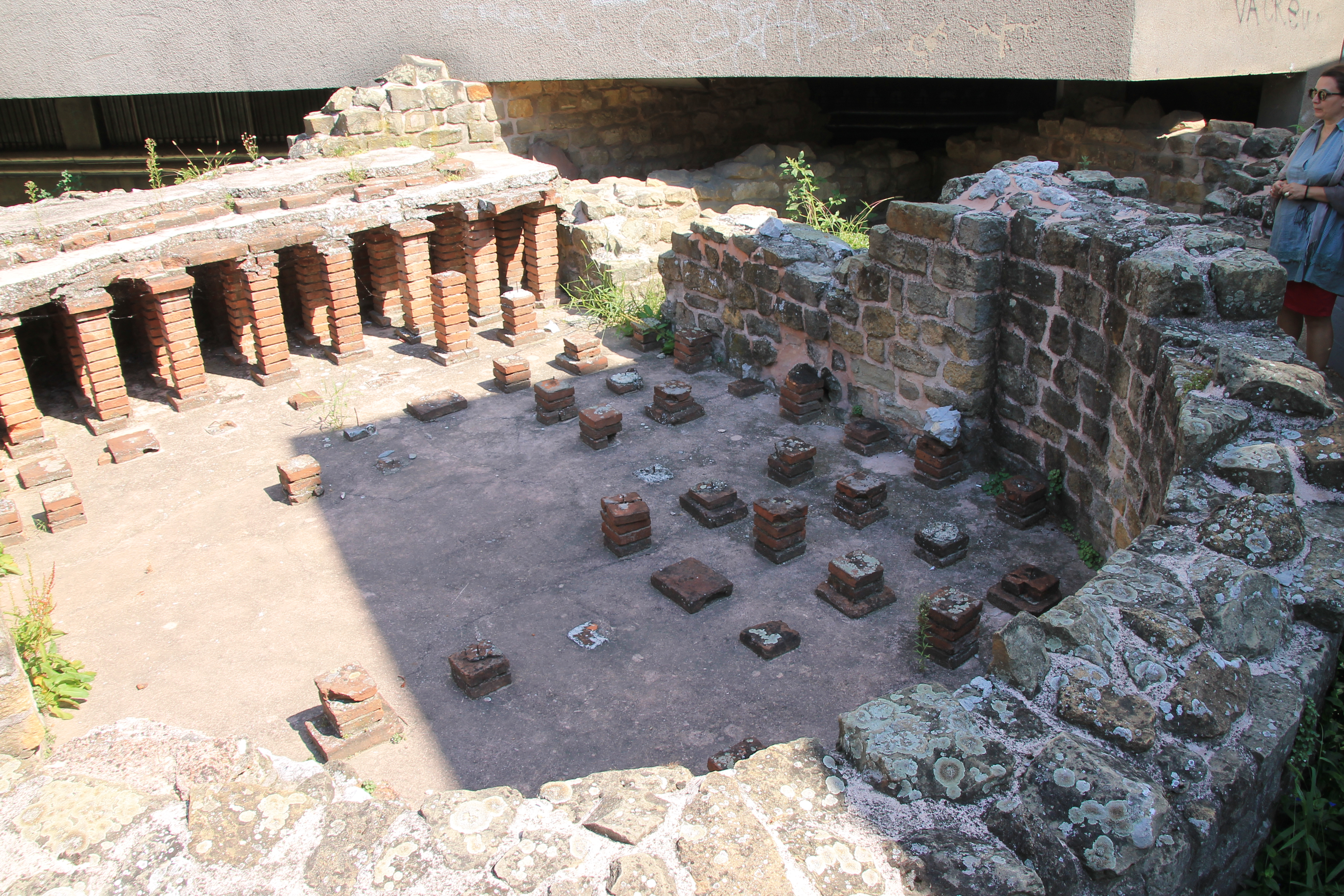
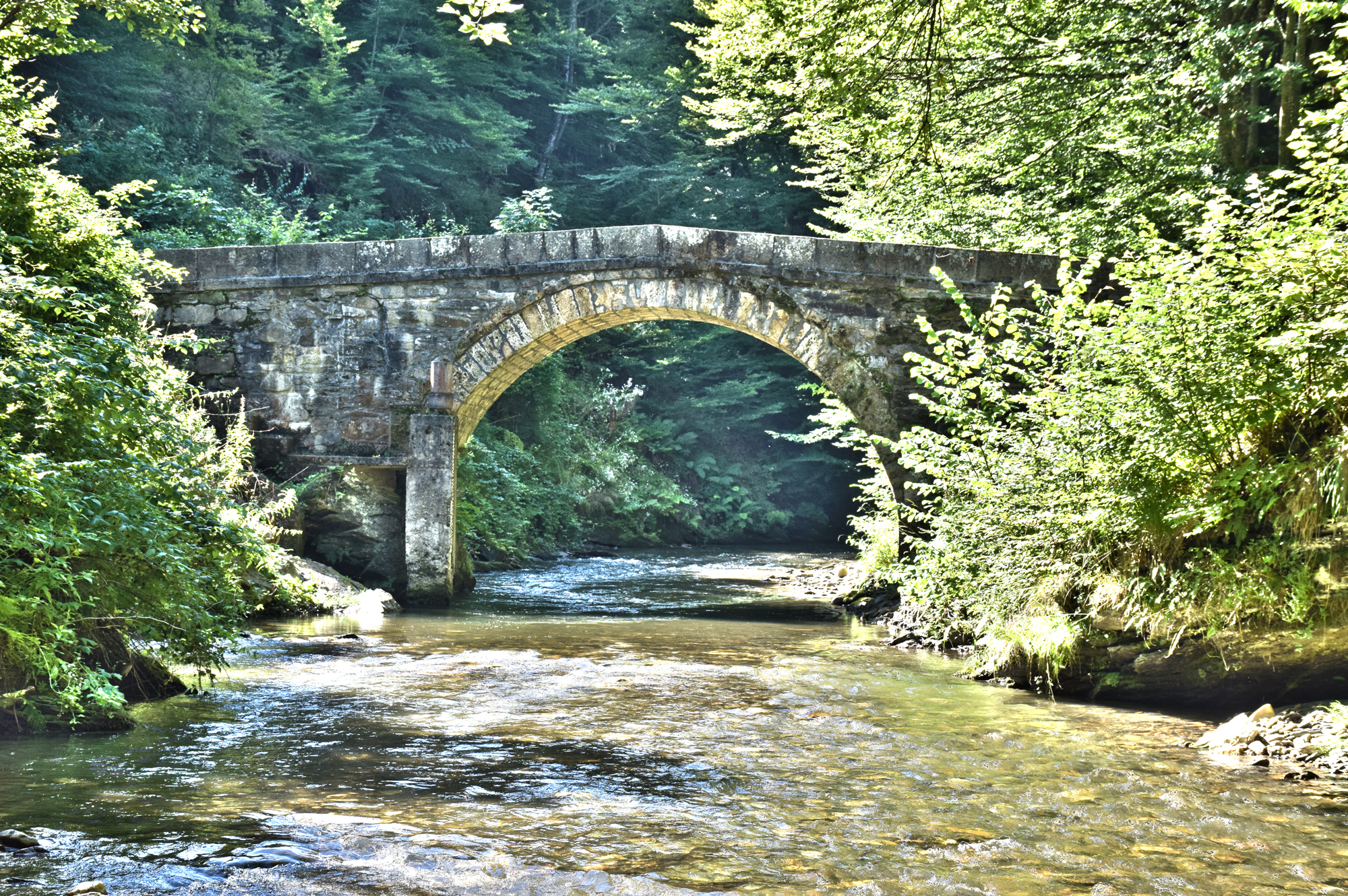
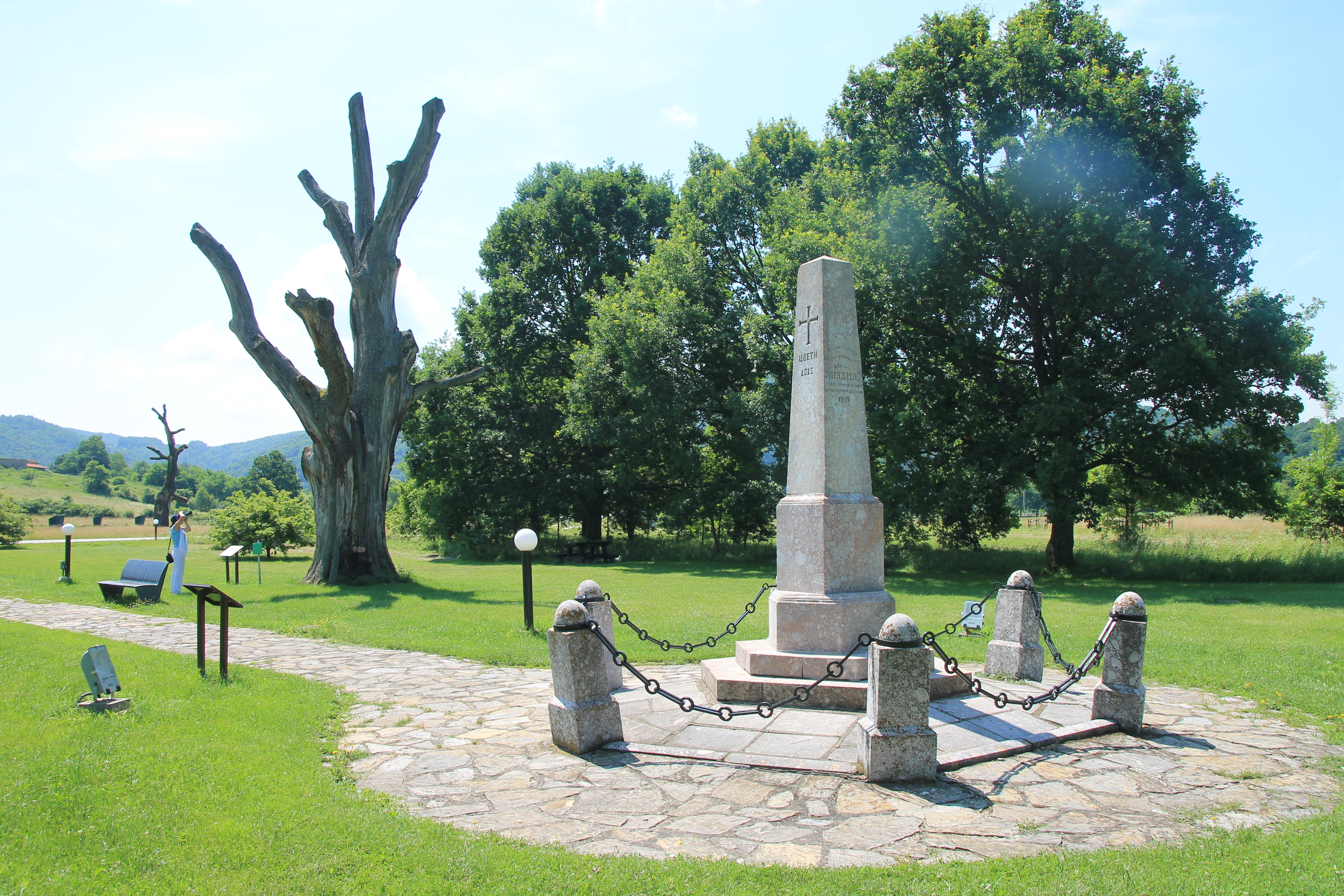
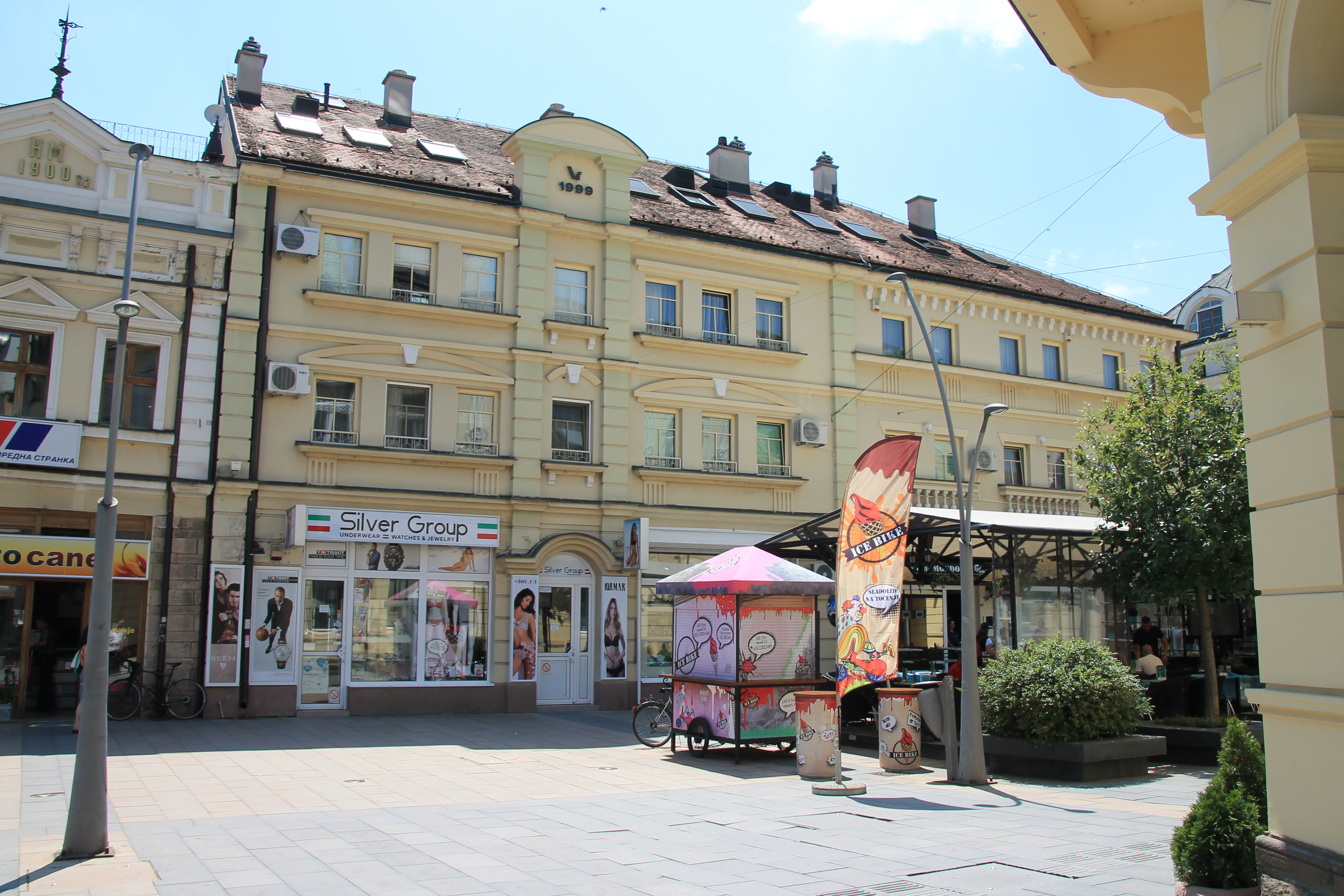
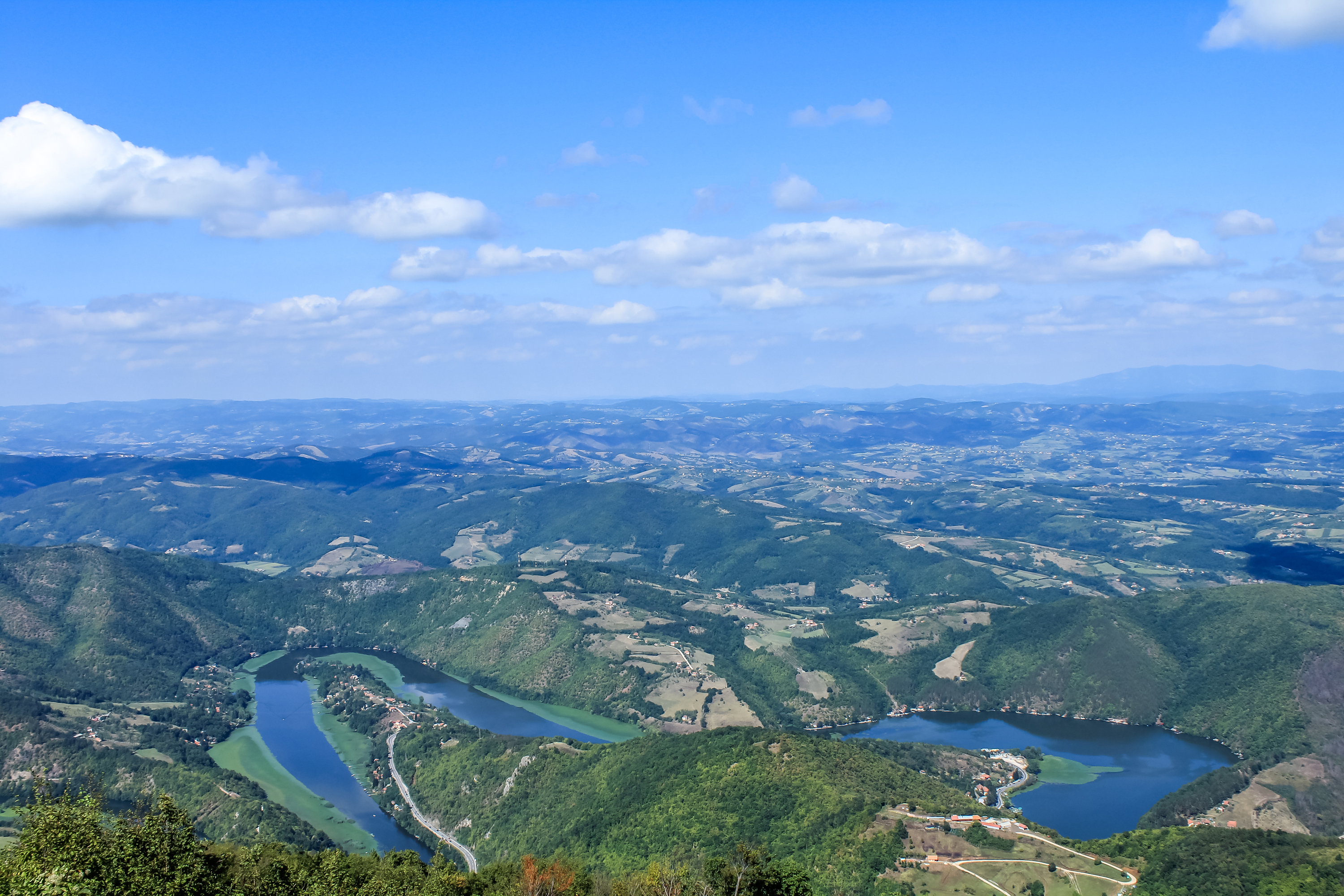
- Images from the Moravica District

- Location of district in Serbia
- Coordinates: 43°53′N 20°21′E
- Country: Serbia
- Administrative center: Čačak

Government
  - Commissioner: Slobodan Jolović

Area
  - Total: 3,016 km^{2} (1,164 sq mi)

Population (2022)
  - Total: 189,281
  - Density: 62.76/km^{2} (162.5/sq mi)
- ISO 3166 code: RS-17
- Municipalities: 3 and 1 city
- Settlements: 206
- Cities and towns: 5
- Villages: 201
- Website: moravicki.okrug.gov.rs

The Moravica District (Serbian: Моравички округ, romanized: Moravički okrug, pronounced [mǒraʋitʃkiː ôkruːɡ]) is one of administrative districts of Serbia. It is located in the central and southwestern parts of Serbia. According to the 2022 census, the district has a population of 189,281 inhabitants. The administrative center of the Moravica District is the city of Čačak.

== History ==
The present-day administrative districts (including Moravica District) were established in 1992 by the decree of the Government of Serbia.

== Cities and municipalities ==
The Mоravica District encompasses one city and three municipalities:

- Čačak (city)
- Gornji Milanovac (municipality)
- Lučani (municipality)
- Ivanjica (municipality)

== Demographics ==
Historical population
Year	Pop.	±% p.a.
1948	189,860	—
1953	200,014	+1.05%
1961	207,195	+0.44%
1971	217,223	+0.47%
1981	229,047	+0.53%
1991	230,748	+0.07%
2002	224,772	−0.24%
2011	212,603	−0.62%
2022	189,281	−1.05%

=== Towns ===
There are three towns with over 10,000 inhabitants.

- Čačak: 69,598
- Gornji Milanovac: 23,109
- Ivanjica: 11,240

=== Ethnic structure ===
Ethnicity	Population	Share
Serbs	178,179	94.1%
Roma	738	0.4%
Others	1,180	0.6%
Undeclared/Unknown	9,184	4.8%

== See also ==
- Administrative districts of Serbia
- Administrative divisions of Serbia
