= Petnica (Čačak) =

Petnica Петница
- Village (Selo)
- Petnica
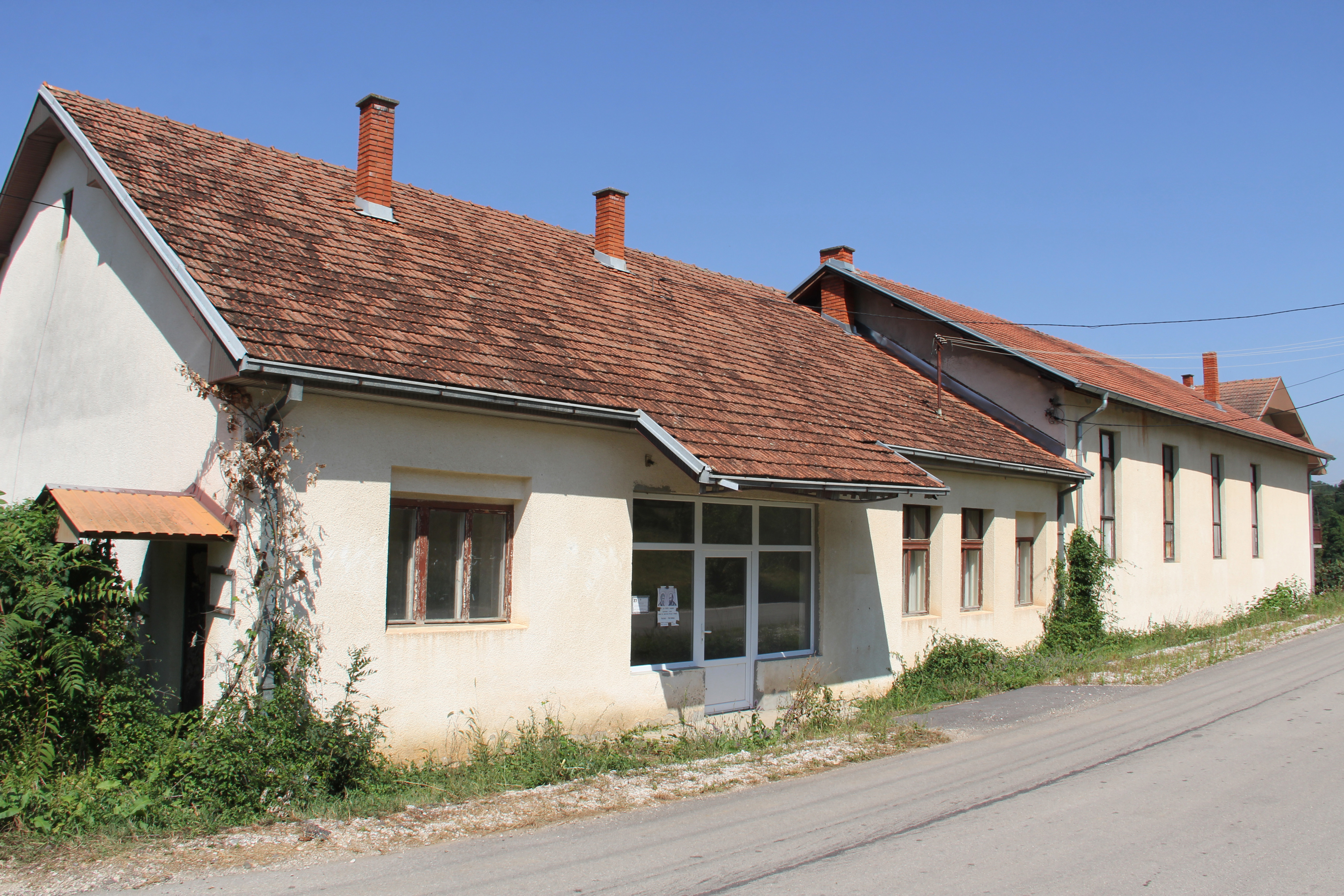
- Petnica in Čačak

- Location within Serbia Petnica (Europe)
- Coordinates: 43°45′35″N 20°26′45″E
- Country: Serbia
- District: Moravica District
- Municipality: Čačak

Area
  - Petnica: 4.51 km^{2} (1.74 sq mi)
- Elevation: 426 m (1,398 ft)

Population (2022)
  - Petnica: 117
  - Density: 25.9/km^{2} (67.2/sq mi)
- Time zone: UTC+1 (CET)
  - Summer (DST): UTC+2 (CEST)
- Postal code: 32224
- Area code: +381(0)32
- Car plates: ČA

Petnica (Serbian Cyrillic: Петница, Serbian pronunciation: [pětnitsa]) is a village in the municipality of Čačak, in the district of Moravica, Serbia. According to the 2022 census, the village has a population of 117 people.

== Etymology ==
According to ethnographic researcher Radovan M. Marinković, locals attribute the name to 14th–15th century settlers arriving from Petnjica in Montenegro who named the village after their homeland in the northern foothills of Mount Jelica. The settlement was first documented under the name Petnica in 1476.

The name can also be from "Pećina" (Cave) or from a stream flowing out of a cave.

== Geography ==
The village is located near Čačak. The closest neighbouring places are Brezovica, Premeća, Žaočani, and Kačulice. The postal code of the village is 32224.

== History ==
=== Origins ===
The oldest part of the village was originally located on a stretch of land known as Selište at the northern foothills of Mount Jelica.

=== Ottoman period ===
Ottoman tax registers (defters) first mention Petnica in 1476 as a village within the knežina of Prince Đurađ, son of Stanislav. At that time, it had 14 households, 23 married adult men, and was led by village headman (primićur) Miloš Turčević.

In 1528, the settlement was listed as Gornja Petnica in the Morava nahiya with nine households inhabited primarily by Vlach cattle herders.

A 1560 defter divided the area into Upper, Middle, and Lower Petnica (Gornja, Srednja, and Donja Petnica), noting that the 18 recorded households had converted to Islam during that period. By 1576, Gornja Petnica had 11 households paying 1,200 akçe in feudal dues.

Following the Ottoman-Habsburg Wars and migrations, the wider Čačak area was repopulated by families from Montenegro, Herzegovina, Bosnia and Stari Vlah.

=== 19th century ===
In 1820 or 1821 Petnica was in the Požega nahiya. It had 19 households, with about 22 married men and 75 adult men.

In 1821 or 1822 Petnica was in the Trnava District. It had 22 households, with 28 taxpayers and 62 adult men.

In 1871, 368 residents were registered in 93 households, and a decade later 309 inhabitants in 88 households.

By 1890, the village became part of the municipality of Lazac.

== Demographics ==
According to the 2022 census, Petnica had 117 inhabitants (62 male and 55 female).

=== Historical population ===
The village population peaked at 441 in 1948 and has been declining since then.

Historical population
Year	Pop.	±%
1948	441	—
1953	427	−3.2%
1961	421	−1.4%
1971	368	−12.6%
1981	303	−17.7%
1991	277	−8.6%
2002	241	−13.0%
2011	180	−25.3%
2022	117	−35.0%
Source: Statistical Office of the Republic of Serbia

== See also ==
- List of places in Serbia
