= Brezovica =

Brezovica may refer to:

== Croatia ==
- Brezovica, Osijek-Baranja County, a village near Marijanci
- Brezovica, Virovitica-Podravina County, a village near Gradina
- Brezovica, Zagreb, a city district of Zagreb
- Brezovica Forest, located near Sisak, headquarters for the 1st Sisak Partisan Detachment in occupied Yugoslavia
- Brezovica Žumberačka, a village near Ozalj, Karlovac County
- Brezovica mountain (Krapina), a mountain near Krapina, Krapina-Zagorje County
- Brezovica mountain (Ogulin), a mountain near Ogulin, Karlovac County

== Kosovo ==
- Brezovica, Kosovo, a settlement in the Municipality of Štrpce, Kosovo
  - Brezovica ski resort, a ski resort

== Montenegro ==
- Brezovica, an alternate name for Beška (Island), in Lake Skadar

== Serbia ==
- Brezovica, Čačak, a village in Moravica District
- Brezovica, Gornji Milanovac, a village in Moravica District
- Brezovica, Ub, a village in Kolubara District
- Brezovica, Vlasotince, a village in Jablanica District
- Brezovica, Trstenik, a village in Rasina District
- Nova Brezovica, a village in the municipality of Vranje, Pčinja District
- Stara Brezovica, a village in the municipality of Vranje, Pčinja District

== Slovakia ==
- Brezovica, Sabinov, a village and municipality in Prešov Region
- Brezovica, Tvrdošín, a village and municipality in Žilina Region

== Slovenia ==
- Blatna Brezovica, a village in the Municipality of Vrhnika, Inner Carniola
- Brezovica na Bizeljskem, a village in the Municipality of Brežiče, Styria
- Brezovica pri Borovnici, a village in the Municipality of Borovnica, Inner Carniola
- Brezovica pri Črmošnjicah, a village in the Municipality of Semič, Lower Carniola
- Brezovica pri Dobu, a village in the Municipality of Domžale, Upper Carniola
- Brezovica pri Gradinu, a village in the Municipality of Koper, Littoral
- Brezovica pri Ljubljani, a village in the Municipality of Brezovica, Inner Carniola
- Brezovica pri Medvodah, a village in the Municipality of Medvode, Upper Carniola
- Brezovica pri Metliki, a village in the Municipality of Metlika, White Carniola
- Brezovica pri Mirni, a village in the Municipality of Mirna, Lower Carniola
- Brezovica pri Predgradu, a village in the Municipality of Kočevje, Lower Carniola
- Brezovica pri Stopičah, a village in the Municipality of Novo Mesto, Lower Carniola
- Brezovica pri Trebelnem, a village in the Municipality of Mokronog-Trebelno, Lower Carniola
- Brezovica pri Zlatem Polju, a village in the Municipality of Lukovica, Upper Carniola
- Brezovica v Podbočju, a village in the Municipality of Krško, Lower Carniola
- Brezovica, Hrpelje-Kozina, a village in the Municipality of Hrpelje-Kozina, Littoral
- Brezovica, Radovljica, a village in the Municipality of Radovljica, Upper Carniola
- Brezovica, Šmarješke Toplice, a village in the Municipality of Šmarješke Toplice, Lower Carniola
- Brezovica, Velika Polana, a village in the Municipality of Velika Polana, Prekmurje
- Brezovica, Zagorje ob Savi, a former village in the Municipality of Zagorje ob Savi, Upper Carniola, now part of Tirna
- Dolenja Brezovica, Brezovica, a village in the Municipality of Brezovica, Inner Carniola
- Dolenja Brezovica, Šentjernej, a village in the Municipality of Šentjernej, Lower Carniola
- Gorenja Brezovica, Brezovica, a village in the Municipality of Brezovica, Inner Carniola
- Gorenja Brezovica, Šentjernej, a village in the Municipality of Šentjernej, Lower Carniola
- Municipality of Brezovica, Inner Carniola

== See also ==
- Brezovice (disambiguation)
- Breza (disambiguation)
