= Brezovac =

Brezovac may refer to:

- Brezovac, Aranđelovac, a village in Serbia
- Brezovac, Bjelovar-Bilogora County, a village near Bjelovar, Croatia
- Brezovac, Karlovac County, a village near Rakovica, Croatia
- Brezovac, Sisak-Moslavina County, a village near Novska, Croatia
- Brezovac Dobroselski, a village near Donji Lapac, Croatia
- Brezovac Žumberački, a village near Samobor, Croatia

== People with the surname ==
- Brigita Brezovac (born 1979), Slovenian professional bodybuilder

== See also ==
- Brezovec (disambiguation)
- Brezovica (disambiguation)
