= Brezovice =

Brezovice may refer to the following villages:

== Bosnia and Herzegovina ==
- Brezovice (Čajniče), Republika Srpska
- Brezovice (Pale), Republika Srpska
- Brezovice (Srebrenica), Republika Srpska

== Czech Republic ==
- Březovice, Mladá Boleslav District, Central Bohemian Region

== Kosovo ==
- Brezovica, Kosovo or Brezovicë, Štrpce municipality

== Serbia ==
- Brezovice (Krupanj), Mačva District
- Brezovice (Valjevo), Kolubara District

== See also ==
- Brezovec (disambiguation)
- Brezovica (disambiguation)
