= Scheibe =

Scheibe may refer to:

- Scheibe-Alsbach, a municipality in the Sonneberg district of Thuringia, Germany
- Scheibe Flugzeugbau, German manufacturer of sailplanes and motorgliders

== People with the surname ==
- Emil P. Scheibe (1861–1910), American politician
- Herbert Scheibe (1914–1991), German colonel
- Jo-Michael Scheibe (born 1950), American conductor and music professor
- Johann Scheibe (c. 1680–1748), German organ builder, see Paulinerkirche, Leipzig; father of Johann Adolf Scheibe
- Johann Adolf Scheibe (1708–1776), German composer, theorist, and critic
- Jörg Scheibe (born 1962), German politician
- Kurt Scheibe (1891–1956), German painter
- Richard Scheibe (1879–1964), German sculptor
- Siegfried Scheibe (1916–1945), Sturmbannführer (Major) in the Waffen SS during World War II
- Susanne Scheibe, German figure skater, former partner of Andreas Nischwitz

== See also ==
- Scheiber
- Scheiße (disambiguation)
