= Breza =

Breza (the word for birch in several Slavic languages) may refer to:

== Places ==
- Breza, Bosnia and Herzegovina, a town in Bosnia and Herzegovina
- Breza, Smolyan Province in Rudozem Municipality, Bulgaria
- Breza, Bjelovar-Bilogora County, a village near Bjelovar, Croatia
- Breza, Primorje-Gorski Kotar County, a village near Klana, Croatia
- Breza, Kolašin, a village in Montenegro
- Breza (Sjenica), a village in Serbia
- Breza, Slovakia, a village near Námestovo, Slovakia
- Breza, Trebnje, a village in the Municipality of Trebnje, southeastern Slovenia
- Mala Breza, a village in the Municipality of Laško, eastern Slovenia

== People ==
- Emily Breza, American development economist
- Paul Breza (1937–2025), American Roman Catholic priest and Kashubian American activist

== Other ==
- Breza (film), 1967 Yugoslav film
