= Studena, Croatia =

Settlement in Primorje-Gorski Kotar County, Croatia

Studena
- Settlement
- Interactive map of Studena
- Location of Studena in Croatia
- Coordinates: 45°25′42″N 14°23′27″E
- Country: Croatia
- County: Primorje-Gorski Kotar
- Municipality: Klana

Area
  - Total: 6.7 km^{2} (2.6 sq mi)

Population (2021)
  - Total: 308
  - Density: 46/km^{2} (120/sq mi)
- Time zone: UTC+1 (CET)
  - Summer (DST): UTC+2 (CEST)
- Postal code: 51217 Klana

Studena is a settlement in the Municipality of Klana in Croatia. In 2021, its population was 308.

== Geography ==
It lies just north of the karst polje of Ponikve.

== Demographics ==
Studena: Population trends 1857–2021
v

population	280	273	308	328	344	413	462	547	433	471	459	467	456	441	409	382	308
	1857	1869	1880	1890	1900	1910	1921	1931	1948	1953	1961	1971	1981	1991	2001	2011	2021

Sources: Croatian Bureau of Statistics publications
