= Gradina, Virovitica-Podravina County =

Gradina
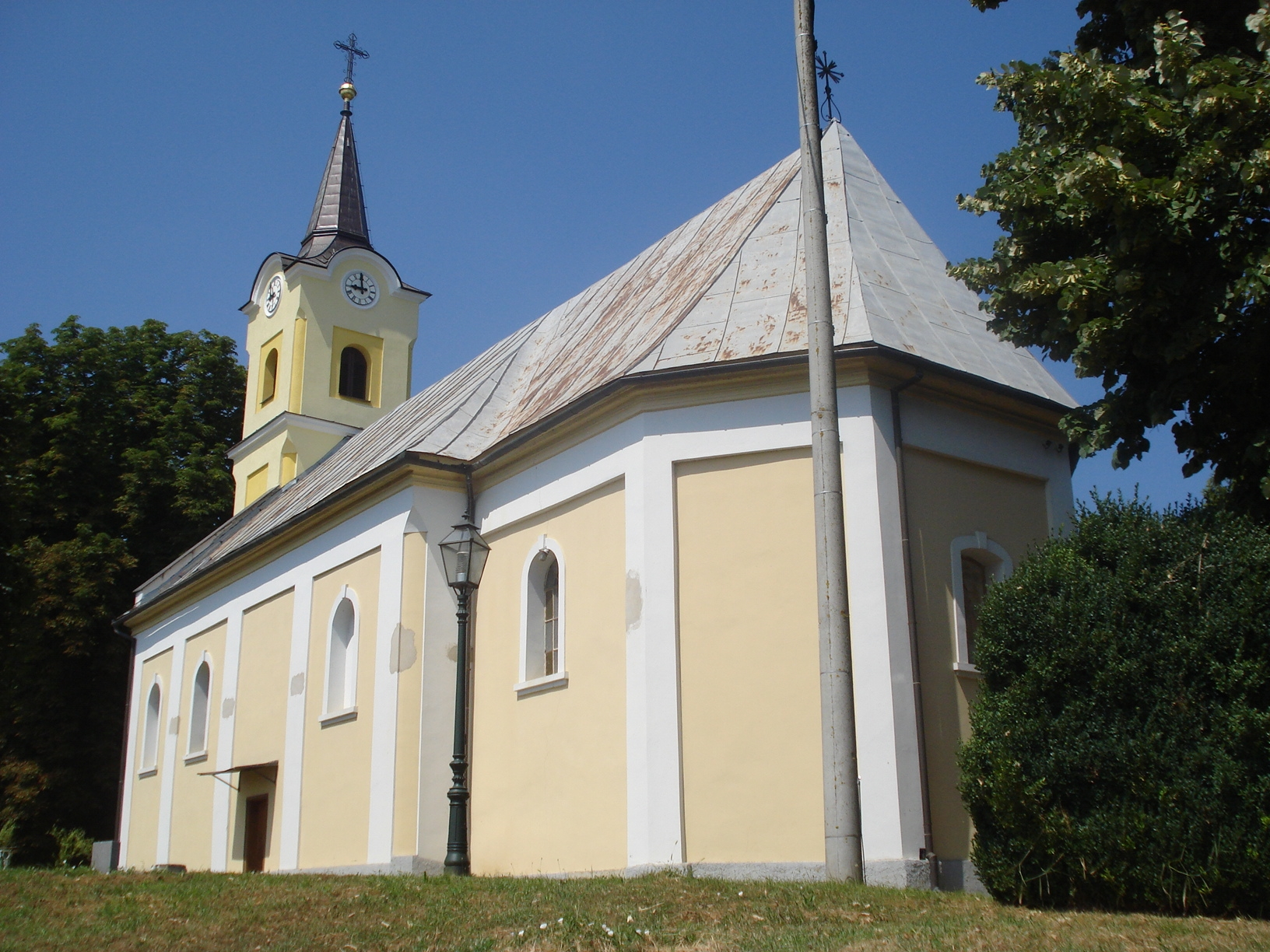
- Parish church of St. Elijah in Gradina
- Interactive map of Gradina
- Location within Croatia
- Coordinates: 45°51′36″N 17°30′36″E
- Country: Croatia
- County: Virovitica-Podravina County

Area
  - Total: 120.2 km^{2} (46.4 sq mi)

Population (2021)
  - Total: 2,874
  - Density: 23.91/km^{2} (61.93/sq mi)
- Time zone: UTC+1 (CET)
  - Summer (DST): UTC+2 (CEST)
- Website: gradina.hr

Gradina is a village and a municipality in Slavonia, in the Virovitica–Podravina County of Croatia.

In the 2011 census, it had a total population of 3,850, in the following settlements:

- Bačevac, population 370
- Brezovica, population 595
- Budakovac, population 257
- Detkovac, population 307
- Gradina, population 916
- Lipovac, population 312
- Lug Gradinski, population 72
- Novi Gradac, population 167
- Rušani, population 477
- Vladimirovac, population 62
- Žlebina, population 315

In the 2001 census, 85.6% of the population were Croats.

== History ==
In the late 19th and early 20th century, Gradina was part of the Virovitica County of the Kingdom of Croatia-Slavonia.

Colonist settlements of Brezovica, Hadžićevo (Svrakovac), Mitrovica, Podravski Sokolac (Vladimirovac), and Žlebina were established on the territory of the village municipality during the land reform in interwar Yugoslavia.

== Politics ==
=== Minority councils ===
Directly elected minority councils and representatives are tasked with consulting tasks for the local or regional authorities in which they are advocating for minority rights and interests, integration into public life and participation in the management of local affairs. At the 2023 Croatian national minorities councils and representatives elections Serbs of Croatia fulfilled legal requirements to elect 10 members minority councils of the Municipality of Gradina.

== Notable people ==
- Boško Buha, famous Serbian World War II child-hero, member of the Yugoslav Partisans
- Slavko Šajber, Croatian politician, football official and former president of the Football Association of Yugoslavia
