= Brezovec =

Brezovec may refer to:

== Places ==
=== Croatia ===
- Brezovec, Croatia, a village in Međimurje County
- Brezovec Zelinski, a village in Zagreb County

=== Slovakia ===
- Brezovec, Slovakia, a village and municipality in the Snina District

=== Slovenia ===
- Brezovec pri Polju, a village in the Municipality of Podčetrtek
- Brezovec pri Rogatcu, a village in the Municipality of Rogatec
- Brezovec, Cirkulane, a village in the Municipality of Cirkulane
- Brezovec, Lendava, a village in the Municipality of Lendava
- Sveti Trije Kralji, Radlje ob Dravi, a village in the Municipality of Radlje ob Dravi, named Brezovec from 1955 to 1993

== People with the surname ==
- Josip Brezovec (born 1986), Croatian football midfielder

== See also ==
- Brezovac (disambiguation)
- Brezovice (disambiguation)
