= Scheiber =

Scheiber is a surname, and may refer to:

- Anne Scheiber (1903/04–1995), American business woman
- Frederick Scheiber, American politician
- Florian Scheiber (born 1987), Austrian skier
- Hugo Scheiber (1873–1950), Hungarian painter
- Maria Scheiber (born 1961), Austrian politician
- Mario Scheiber (born 1983), Austrian skier
- Matthias Scheiber (born 1946), Austrian politician
- Noam Scheiber, editor for The New Republic
- Peter Scheiber, (born 1935), American inventor of Quadraphonic sound
- Sándor Scheiber (or Alexander Scheiber) (1913–1985), Hungarian rabbi and Jewish scholar

== Variant surnames ==
- Slavko Šajber (1929–2003), Croatian politician, football official and former president of the Football Association of Yugoslavia
