= Klana =

- Municipality
- Klana Municipality; Općina Klana
- Flag
- Interactive map of Klana
- Location within Croatia
- Coordinates: 45°27′0″N 14°22′48″E
- Country: Croatia
- County: Primorje-Gorski Kotar County

Government
  - Mayor: Željka Šarčević Grgić (SDP)
  - City Council: 11 members: SDP-PGS-HSS (4); _; HDZ (3); _; Independents (2); _; Independents (1); _; Independents (1)

Area
  - Municipality: 94.3 km^{2} (36.4 sq mi)
  - Urban: 56.3 km^{2} (21.7 sq mi)

Population (2021)
  - Municipality: 1,845
  - Density: 19.6/km^{2} (50.7/sq mi)
  - Urban: 1,147
  - Urban density: 20.4/km^{2} (52.8/sq mi)
- Time zone: UTC+1 (CET)
  - Summer (DST): UTC+2 (CEST)
- Postal code: 51217 Klana
- Area code: 051
- Website: www.klana.hr

Klana is a municipality in Primorje-Gorski Kotar County in northwestern Croatia.

== Geography ==
The municipal area is situated in the densely forested Gorski kotar mountains, about 18 km (11 mi) north of Rijeka and the Kvarner Gulf, close to the border with Slovenia. At Klana is the source of the Reka river, running northwards across the border towards the Slovenian Snežnik karst plateau. Though officially part of Primorje-Gorski Kotar County, the area marks the northeastern rim of the Istrian historical region, bordering Croatia proper in the east as well as Slovene Istria and Inner Carniola in the north.

There are 1,975 inhabitants, in the following settlements:

- Breza, population 60
- Klana, population 1,203
- Lisac, population 114
- Studena, population 382
- Škalnica, population 216

As of 2011, the population is 94% Croats.

== History ==
The name Klana was first mentioned in a 1235 deed (located in the Roman library) recording a visit of the Bishop of Pula. Due to its geographical position at a crossroads from north to south and from east to west, as well as its forests rich in wildlife and fresh water springs, the area was suitable for settlement even in ancient times. Indications of Histri settlements trace back to around the 6th or 5th century BC.

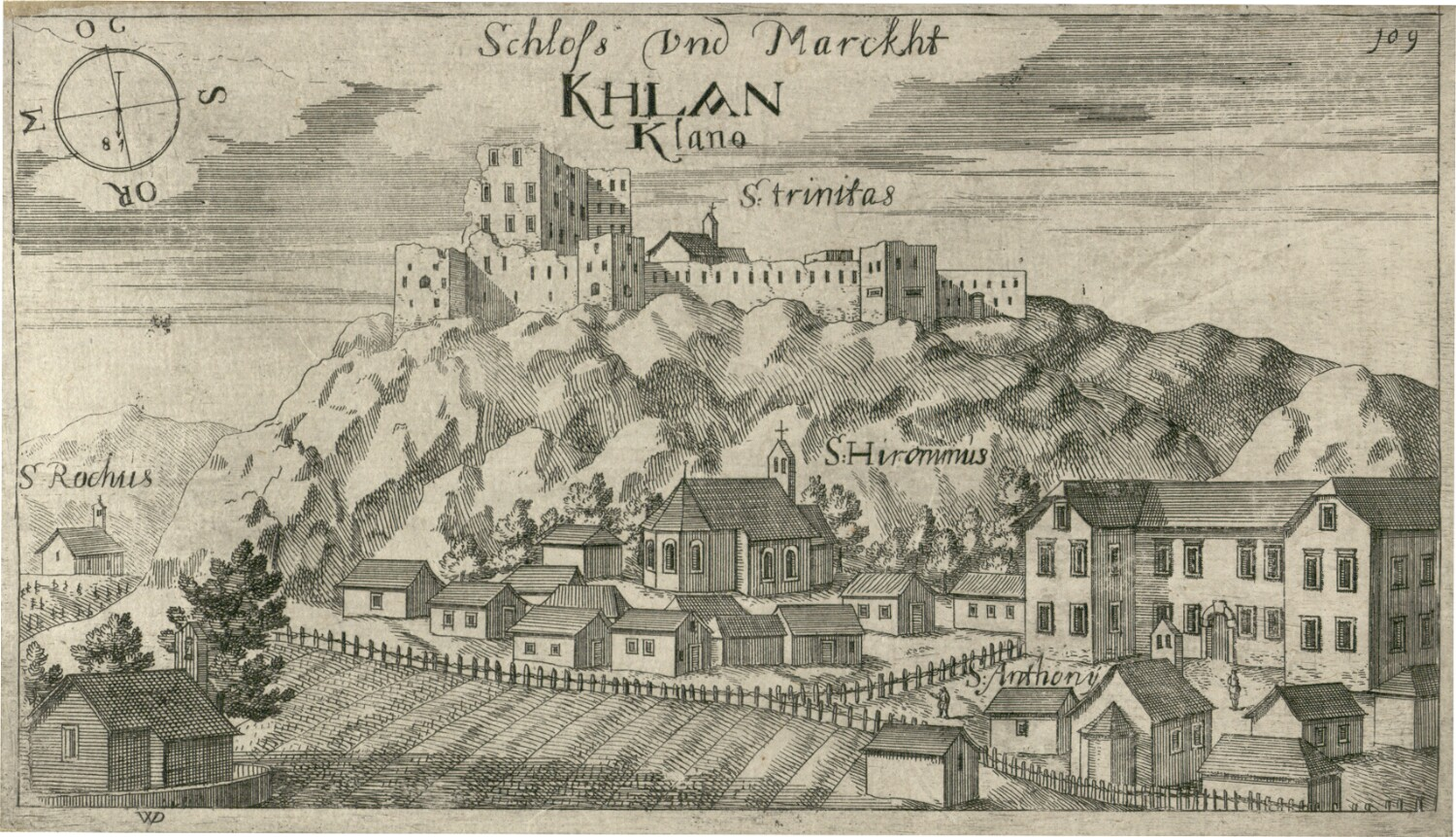
Klana castle and market, engraving by Johann Weikhard von Valvasor, 1679

Croatians settled in the eastern and central Istrian peninsula, as well as in the area around Klana, from the 7th century onwards and early on accepted Christianity. Mass was conducted in the Old Church Slavonic language and writing was done in Glagolitic, with evidence in the Vatican archives of mass in Old Slavonic taking place in the 13th century in the Holy Trinity Church of the castle overlooking the town. Additional evidence of Glagolitic writing is in the form of an inscription from 1439 AD placed over the door to the sacristy of the parish church of St. Jerome. The scholar Johann Weikhard von Valvasor (1641–1693) wrote of the celebration of mass in Old Slavonic in the 17th century.

In 1040 Emperor Henry III had established the March of Istria; from the 12th century onwards Klana was a possession of the Counts of Castel Duino, officials of the Counts of Gorizia at nearby Kastav. In 1374 northeastern Istria finally passed to the Austrian House of Habsburg, while the western and southern parts of the peninsula were gradually conquered by the Republic of Venice. From about 1400 the Klana estates were held by the Lords of Walsee. Throughout the Middle Ages, Klana was an important trading center and incorporated turnpike with postal service coordinated between the Imperial Duchy of Carniola in the north and the Adriatic Port of Rijeka.

In Early Modern times, Klana and the whole Habsburg monarchy were constantly threatened by the Ottoman Turks who repeatedly raided the region. However, on 2 February 1559, the Ottomans under the leadership of Malkoč-beg experienced a heavy defeat by Uskok forces under Ivan Lenković at the Battle of Klana. From the 15th century until 1918, with a short-lived discontinuation within the Napoleonic Kingdom of Italy and the Illyrian Provinces from 1805 to 1815, power was stabilized under the Austrian Habsburgs, who gave rule over Klana as a gift to various Lords. In 1849 it was incorporated into the Austrian Littoral crown land.

In 1843, Klana began operating a public school and the first known teacher was Joseph Corsiga. After the abolition of serfdom upon the 1848 revolution, the people of Klana purchased from Baron Andrije Negovetić his portion of land in 1861, including the right (which expired at the beginning of the 20th century) to elect a mayor. 1852 saw the birth of Matko Laginja, a national revivalist of Istria and in 1920 Ban of Croatia, the most notable native of the region. Klana was hit by a devastating earthquake in 1870 that destroyed most of the houses, but fortunately there were no casualties. In that same year, a post office was established and in 1882 gas lamps were introduced.

At the beginning of the 20th century, Klana, despite the loss of importance gained in the past century, was still developing. Thus, in 1908, the post office received a telegraph station, 1911 saw the merchant Anton Medvedić establish a sawmill, and in 1913 Klana received its first aqueduct. Also at that time a reading room, library and tamburitza club were established.

During World War I, the people of Klana, like their neighbors, fought on battlefields across Europe. With the dissolution of the Austro-Hungarian Empire in 1918, Klana became part of the unrecognized State of Slovenes, Croats and Serbs, but almost simultaneously it was occupied by Italian forces along with the surrounding villages. The Treaty of Rapallo two years later drew the border between Klana and Studena so that Studena remained a part of the Kingdom of Serbs, Croats, and Slovenes (later Yugoslavia) while Klana, Škalnica, Lisac and Breza were annexed into the Julian March of Italy.

Klana soon became one of the largest border garrisons of the Italian kingdom, where there were stationed up to 10,000 Italian soldiers. Despite the high concentration of troops and attempt at Italianization, which almost immediately began and culminated in various fascist repressions and the introduction of Italian in school and other institutions, people living in Klana still preserved their Croatian identity. One of the most stalwart guardians of Croatian was Pastor Ivan Koruza, who was in Klana from 1896 to 1942. In the mid 1930s, many Klana residents were forcibly mobilized and sent to the battlefields of the Italo-Abyssinian War in Ethiopia. Following Italy's capitulation in World War II and the decision of ZAVNOH (State Anti-fascist Council for the National Liberation of Croatia) in 1943, Klana with Istria joined the Socialist Republic of Croatia, though two difficult years of war lay ahead. Nazi German forces occupied the region in 1944 and reinforced the Rapallo border such that in April and May 1945, fierce fighting took place. Klana was finally liberated on 5 May 1945.

After World War Two, Klana was an independent municipality from 1945 to 1953 and then a local community within the framework of the former Municipality of Rijeka. In Klana there is a sawmill and forestry service, a newly built school, firestation, community hall, restored churches and despite depopulation, is an area of urbanization. In the Croatian War of Independence, fought from 1991 to 1995, many people from the area participated in the defense of the country. In 1993 in the new democratic country of Croatia, Klana again became a municipality united with Studena, Škalnica, Lisac and Breza, thus establishing the conditions for community development through a localized government.

In September 2017, the Ričina flooded many homes in the centre of Klana. A record 222 millimetres (8.7 in) of rain had fallen within 10 hours. Hot meals were prepared for the evacuated at the Škulja restaurant, and firefighters worked to drain the flooded basements.

== Gradina Castle ==
The archeological site of Gradina Castle (Kaštel Gradina or "Gradina") is located on the top of a rocky hill just above the town center. The highest point of the building is located at 629 m above sea level. The strategic position was first used during late antiquity in the 3rd century AD during the time of the construction of a system of surveillance stations, fortifications, and ramparts known as the "Liburnian Limes". Since the limes pass by the town of Studena, this overlook is already located within the Roman Empire, which means that the town was also under Roman rule. After the collapse of the Western Roman Empire in the 5th century, oversight of the town changed quickly.

In the 10th century, Klana belonged to the Croatian state as evidenced by the nearby town of Permani, named after the Croatian border guards. Around 1118, Croatia lost the area from the town of Mune to Klana, which was conquered by the Germans, so that now a new border ran along the river Rječina and the defense of Croatia is taken over by the people of Grobnica and their guards, the "Permani". In 1351, Rudolf Devinski (a Count of Devin, named after Duino Castle near Trieste) recognized the Counts of Goričko as his seniors; however, as early as 1366, he was forced to recognize the Habsburgs as his masters. In 1399, the Devin family died out, and their estates were taken over by the Counts of Walsee of Habsburg lineage and were allowed to use the Devin coat of arms. The Walsee family began upgrading and enlarging the living space and the former guard space slowly grew into a less robust fort. Over time, the quality of housing gradually improves, as evidenced by the use of stoves of various qualities. In the immediate vicinity was built the chapel of the Holy Trinity, from which originated a fragment of the Glagolitic inscription dated to 1439, which is currently built into the facade of the parish church of St. Hieronymus.

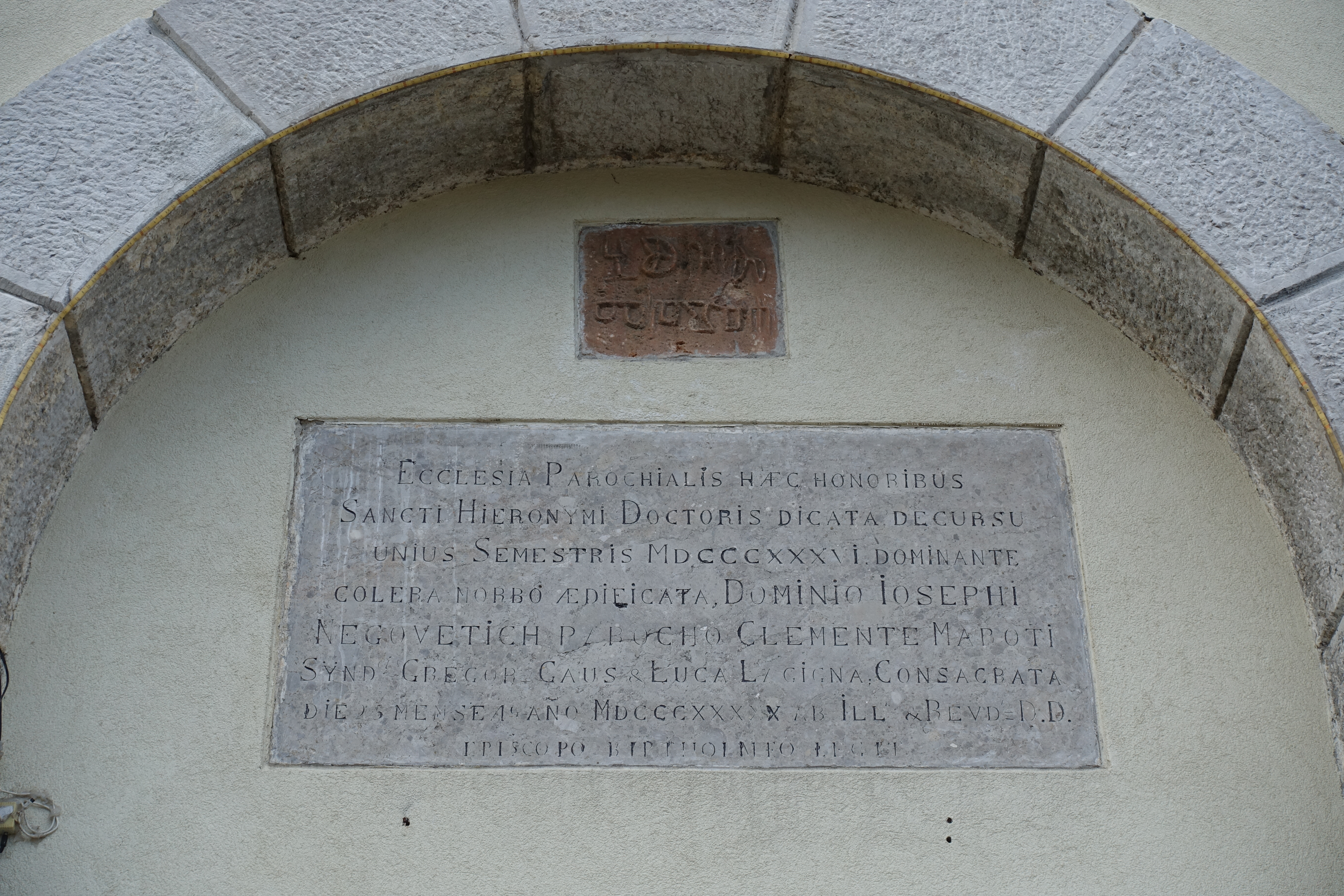
Glagolitic relief of 1439 and tablet of sale from 1860 above the entrance to St. Hieronymus's Church in Klana

The expansion of the premises and the construction of the chapel prove that a representative of the Gothic Captaincy was already staying in Klana at that time, which can already be considered the core of the future Klan lordship. The Walsee family held this area until 1466, when the last offspring of the Walsee lineage, Wolfgang, died, and the Klan lordship passed into the hands of the Habsburgs on the basis of his will. In 1468, Emperor Frederick III of the Habsburgs leased fortified barracks in Klana and Rijeka to a Mr. Barbo for two years for 1,400 crowns a year. How the Barbo family comes into possession of the entire estate and Klana is unknown. Gradina Castle was expanded to include a larger open area for the reception of population and livestock within the walls. In the sixteenth century, Europe was seriously threatened by Ottoman invasion. The army and local authorities organized a system of couriers for the urgent transmission of news along the border. An alert system was developed through a combination of bonfires, horn/bell signals, and courier services. Gradina Castle always had two horsemen ready to report danger to Ljubljana and Trieste on light, karst horses so that at the first observation of approaching enemy armies, the so-called "Turkish Letters" from Klana would be immediately sent by couriers, footmen, or horsemen depending on the urgency of the situation.In January 1559, the Ottoman army led by Malkoč-Beg (known as one of the most belligerent Turkish warlords) approached the fortified Gradina Castle where the well-known Turkish ferocity was broken and the army repelled. One month after that, on February 2, the Turks came back with greater ferocity and anger, imbued with a desire for revenge, but this time they were repulsed and left behind many fallen comrades on the battlefield. Residents then chopped up the bodies of the slain Turks and fed them to their dogs, according to a report by Martin Bautcher. The Turks instilled such anger and hatred that the inhabitants considered the slain bodies unworthy of burial. As the castle was damaged and became unsuitable for housing, the Barbo family built a new, smaller two-story classic castle that was below the original and closer to Klana itself (the current location of the Forestry Service Offices) and likely burned down in the early 18th century, so the other owners and everyone else stopped living in Klana, which had a negative impact on the development of the town and surrounding area.

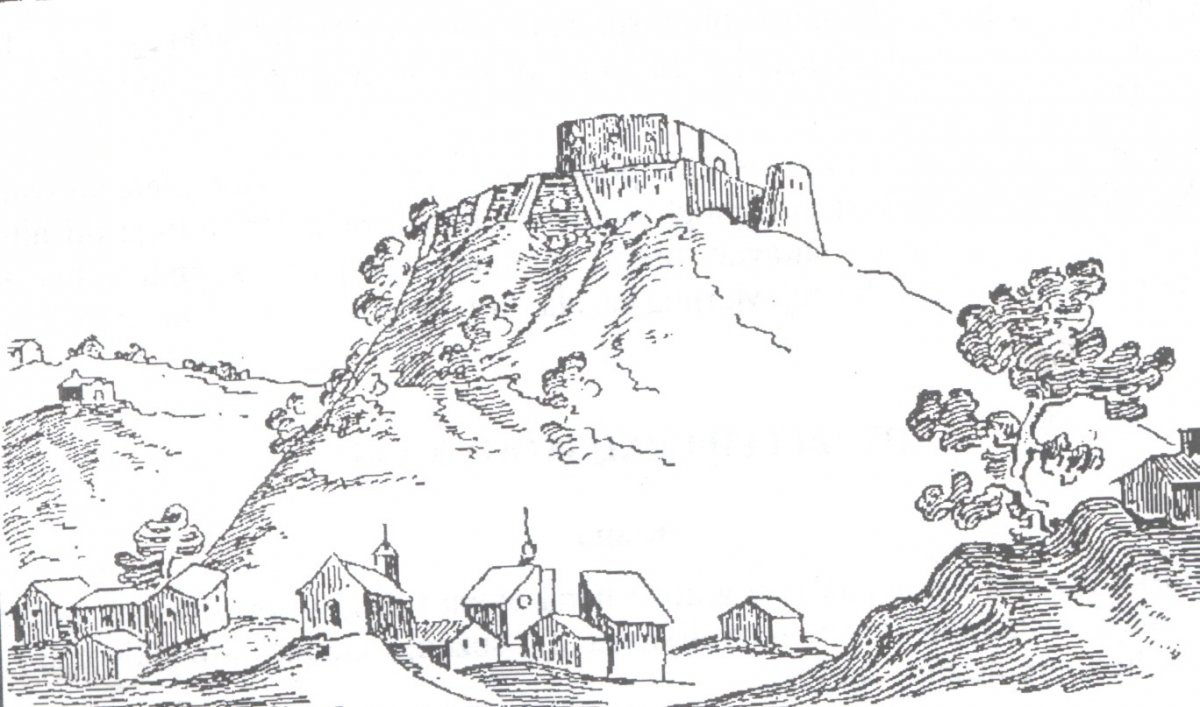
Gradina Castlem, Pieroni, 17th century

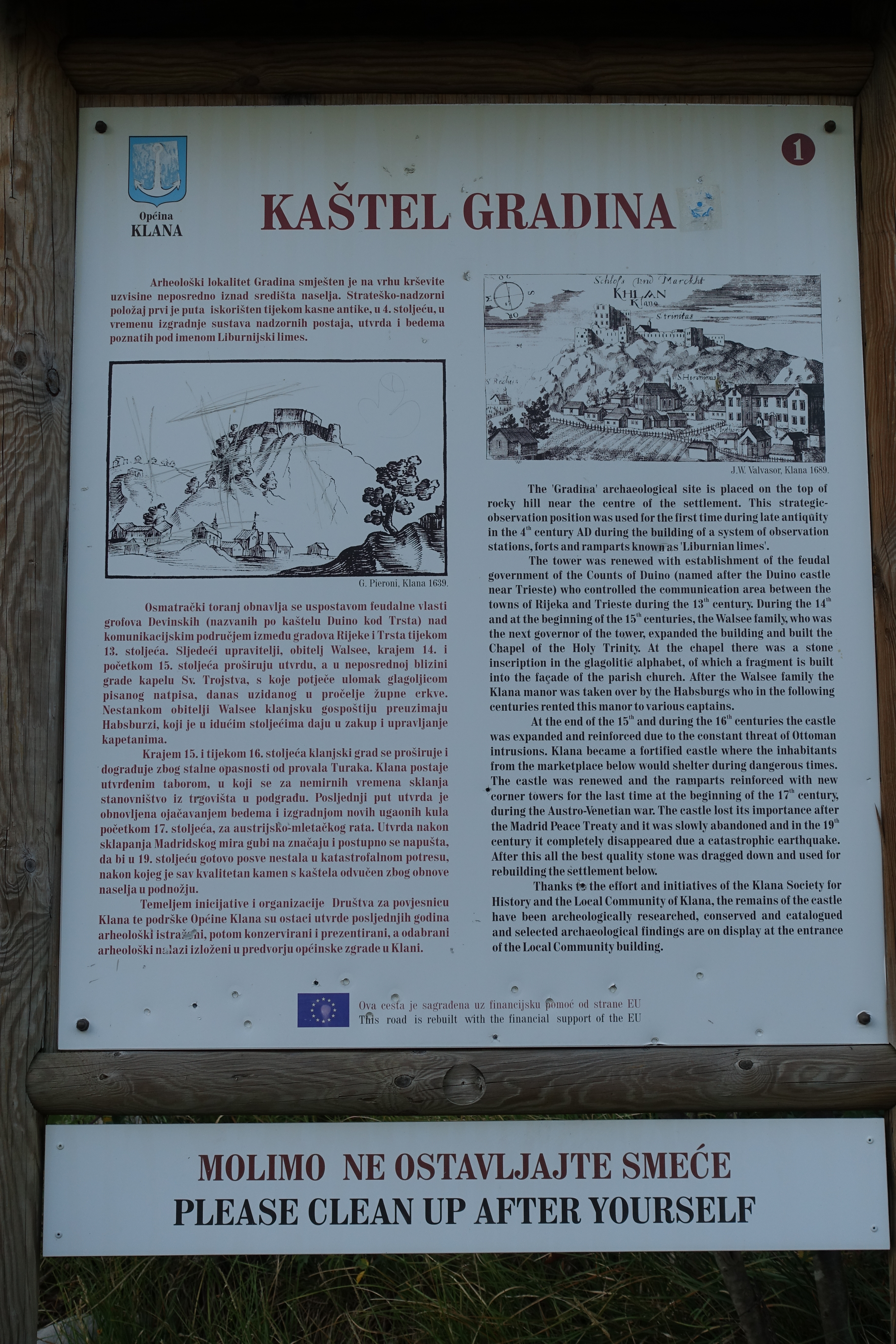
Information Placard at the Entrance to Gradina Castle

At the beginning of the 17th century, the threat of Turkish invasion ceased. In the first third of the 17th century, Baroness Elizabetta Barbo, the daughter of Ludovica Ambrosi Barbo married Baron Carlo Panizzoli with a dowry that included Klana and the castle. Due to the Austro-Venetian war and most likely at the request of the Imperial Chamber, new corner towers were built such that the old round towers were partly rebuilt and partly demolished, after which new ones were built with a much thicker trapezoidal floor plan. The castle now has the shape of an elongated irregular rectangle which follows the natural strata of the rocky elevation. The maximum length of the fortress is 75 m and the width varies from 20 to 25 m.

Their daughter Ana Maria marries the knight Oraz Scampicchi, who after her death sells Klana to Baron Wolfgang Oberburg. In the first half of the 18th century, the Barons Lazzarini came into possession of the lordship of Klana and ruled it for almost a century though their residence is in nearby Guteneg. After the Lazzarinis, the Barons Negovetić became owners of Klana. Andrija Negovetić, Josip's son whose name is inscribed on the plaque above the entrance to the parish church of St. Hieronymus, on December 29, 1860, sold the lordship of Klana to the inhabitants along with all the remaining estate and forests. After the conclusion of the "Madrid" peace, the castle lost its significance and was gradually abandoned, so that in the 19th century almost completely disappeared in the catastrophic earthquake that struck the area of Klana on March 1, 1870, after which all the quality stone was removed from the castle due to the reconstruction of the settlement at the foot of the castle.

In the early 1990s, under the supervision of the Conservation Department of the State Institution for the Protection of Memorial Heritage, under the expert guidance of archaeologists, and at the initiative of the Historical Society of Klana, systematic archaeological conservation work began at Gradina Castle. With the help of the Municipality of Klana, Primorje-Gorski Kotar County, and partly the Republic of Croatia at the beginning of the 21st century, all the necessary funds were provided for this long-term work, which has come to an end thanks to a significant amount of European funds that helped to create an access road to the castle allowing for use in tourism and other events.

== Catholic Churches and Chapels ==
=== Saint Jerome Church ===
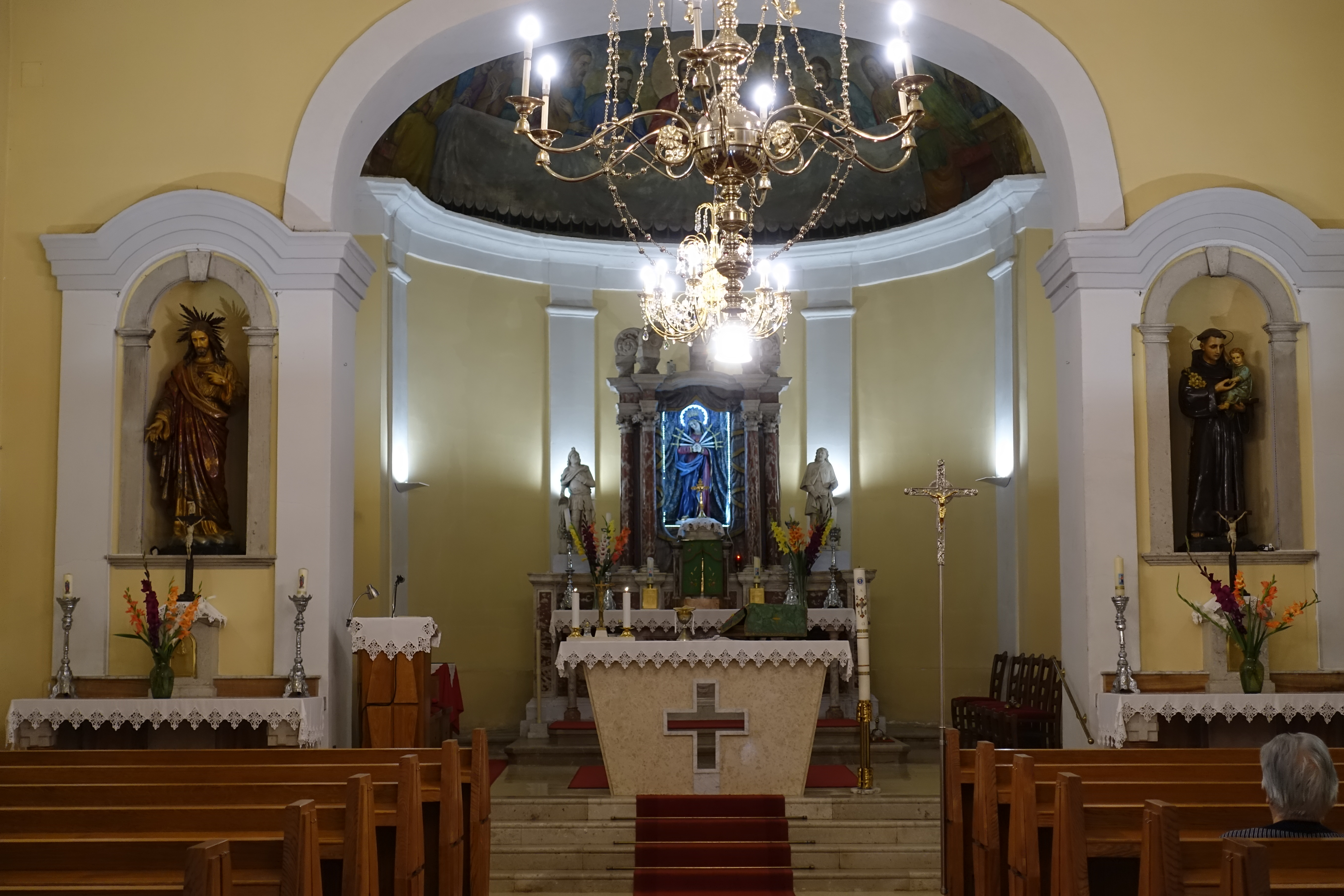
Interior view of the main altar of St. Hieronymus's Church in Klana

St. Jerome's Church (St. Hieronymus; Klana dialect: Sveti Jerolim) is the main parish church for the municipality of Klana. Few written records about the history of the church survive as they were destroyed in the parish archives during World War II when the parish office and the priest's house were destroyed during aerial bombing. In 1679, Johann Weikhard Valvasor made a graphic representation of Klana with the church of St. Hieronymus suggesting that the church existed as early as the 17th century. Construction was completed in 1836 and the church was consecrated in 1850 by Bishop Bartholomew Legat. Above the main entrance there is a built-in stone slab with a Latin inscription which says that the church was completed at a time when the largest landowner in Klana was Josip Negovetić (landowner), pastor Klement Marotti, and church elders Grgur Gauš and Luka Laginja. In 1870, a devastating earthquake struck Klana, the vault of the church was damaged, the steps to the main altar, and the altar itself. The church was thoroughly repaired, but underwent major alterations throughout the twentieth century.

The most valuable artifact found in the church is a fragment of a Glagolitic stone slab from 1439. On that fragment it is written, "1439 it is written" and it is built into the face of the church above the main entrance. This is evidence of the use of the Glagolitic alphabet in this area and is unique in that its letters are raised instead of carved out. Inside the church can be found a marble altar of the Virgin of the Seven Sorrows, located in a semicircular apse (late 18th century). On the main altar on either side are sculptures of light marble: the left represents St. Florian and the right St. Rocco. There is also a baptistery from the 18th century, decorated with a shallow relief of ivy or plant-like forms, which is built into the wall to the left of the altar. On November 5, 1906 the Administrative Council of the Municipality of Klana ordered a new organ from the Zupan Brothers factory in Kamova Gorica, which was then assembled and put into use in 1907.

In 1916, during World War I, Austrian authorities removed all three bells and melted them down to make cannons. The church was without bells until 1922, when the pastor procured three new bells from Udine, Italy. 12 kg of silver was used to cast the large bell along with the bronze, but in 1942, two of these three bells experience the same fate as the ones they replaced: they were taken down and melted by the Italian military. In the 1960s and 1970s, the roof and interior of the church were thoroughly renovated and according to plans from the beginning of the 20th century, the tower was reconstructed (1994), new bells were installed (1995) along with a new organ. In 2001, the benches and choir were renovated, which is where the church's appearance remains today.

=== Saint Rocco Church ===
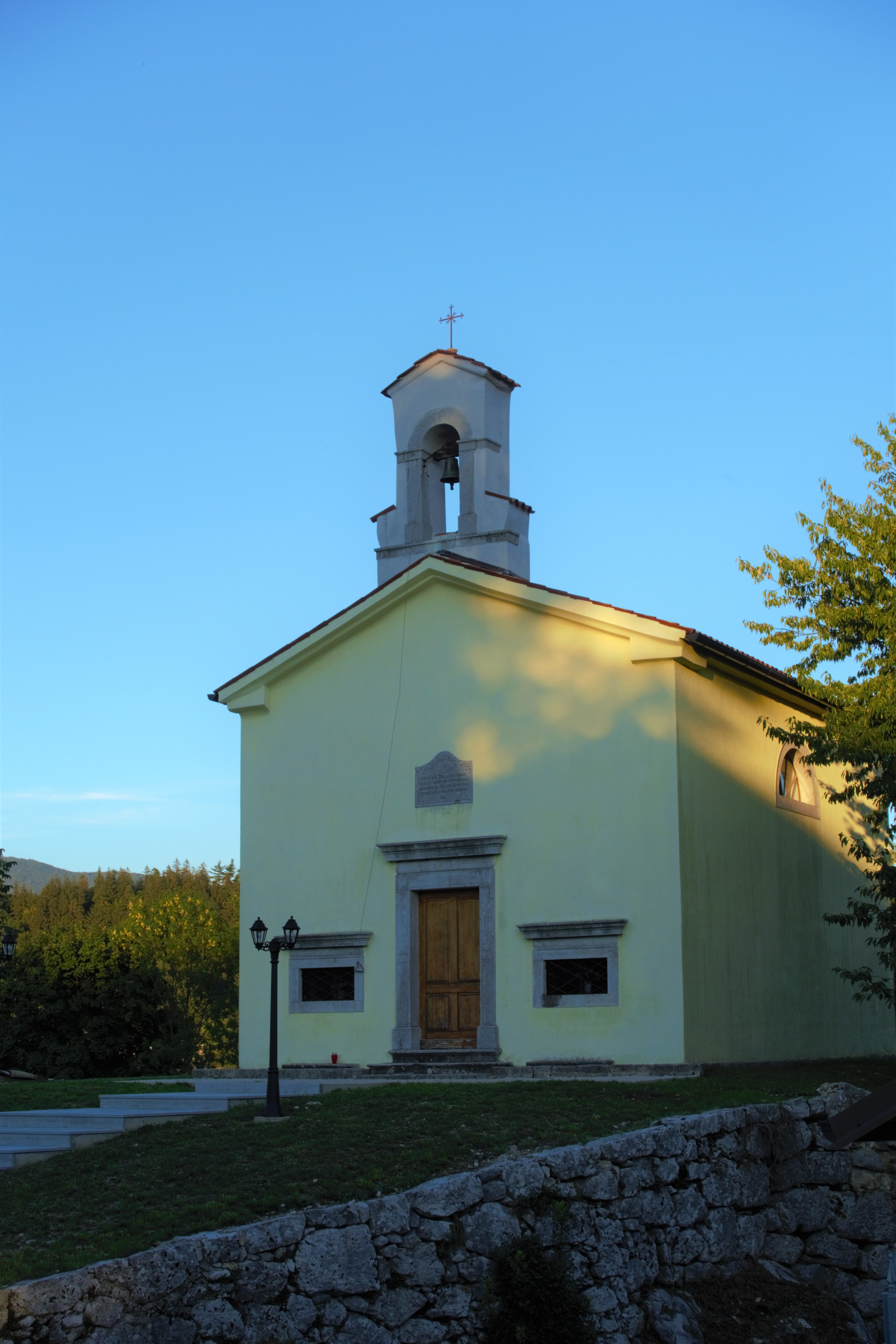
View of St. Rocco's Church from the main road in Klana

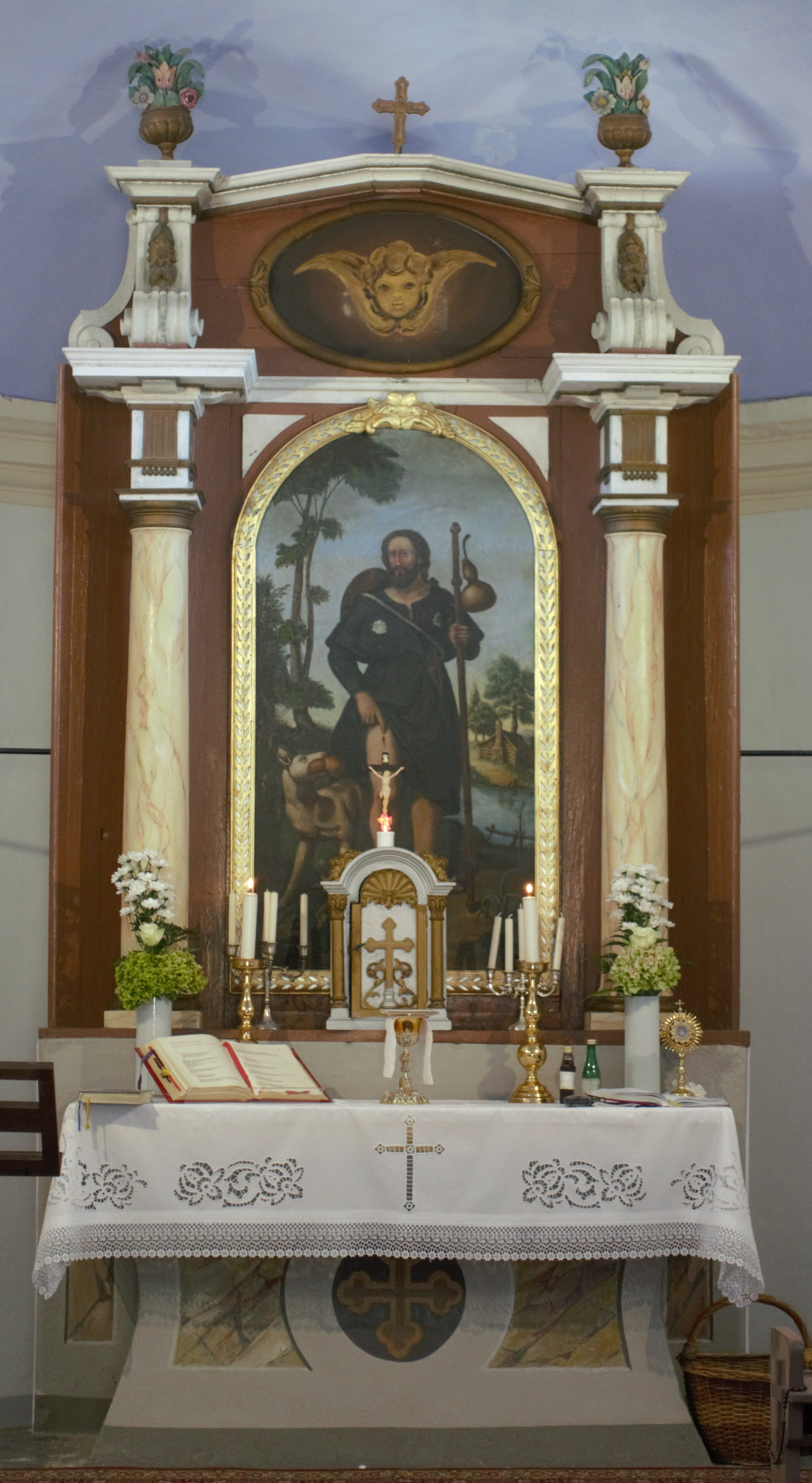
Main Altar of St. Rocco in Klana

St. Rocco's Church was mentioned as early as the 17th century by Valvasor as a chapel of ease of the parish church of St. Jerome. It is not known when this church was built, but it was almost certainly built before 1630. It is located at the entrance to the main village next to the road, typical of the churches built in honor of St. Rocco. Today's church was built on the site of the old one in 1861.

The central position in the church is occupied by an altar formed from the image of St. Rocco lined with marble. St. Rocco shown in the image has all the iconographic elements that can be attributed to it: a Jesuit bearded face and long hair, a low-cut modest habit with tucked shells, Jacob's cap - a symbol of pilgrimage to the Spanish Saint James Compostello (St. Rocco was never there, but helped and protected pilgrims.) His left hand rests on a pilgrim's stick on which a gourd of water is hung, and on his right thigh, the saint points to a newly healed wound that symbolizes a plague.

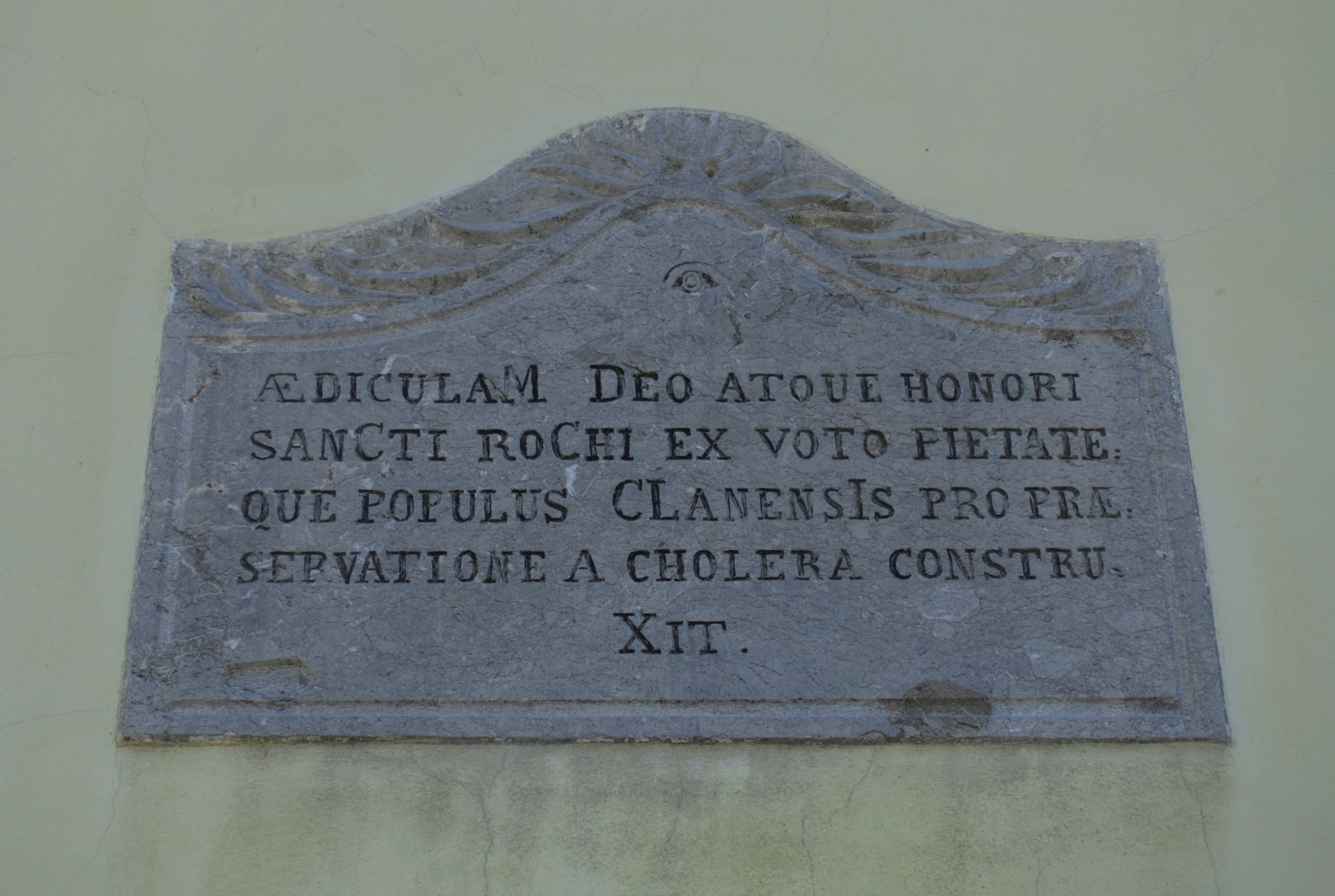
Dedication plaque of St. Rocco above the church entrance

Legend says that St. Rocco's picture came out in front of the plague and stopped it with the words: “I'm mowing here, not you!” The plague was stopped and proceeded to affect Skalnica, sparing the town of Klana. Since then, the 'Rokova' Festival has been celebrated in Klana by holding a fair and dance and is a large multi-day festival.

=== Saint Michael's Church ===
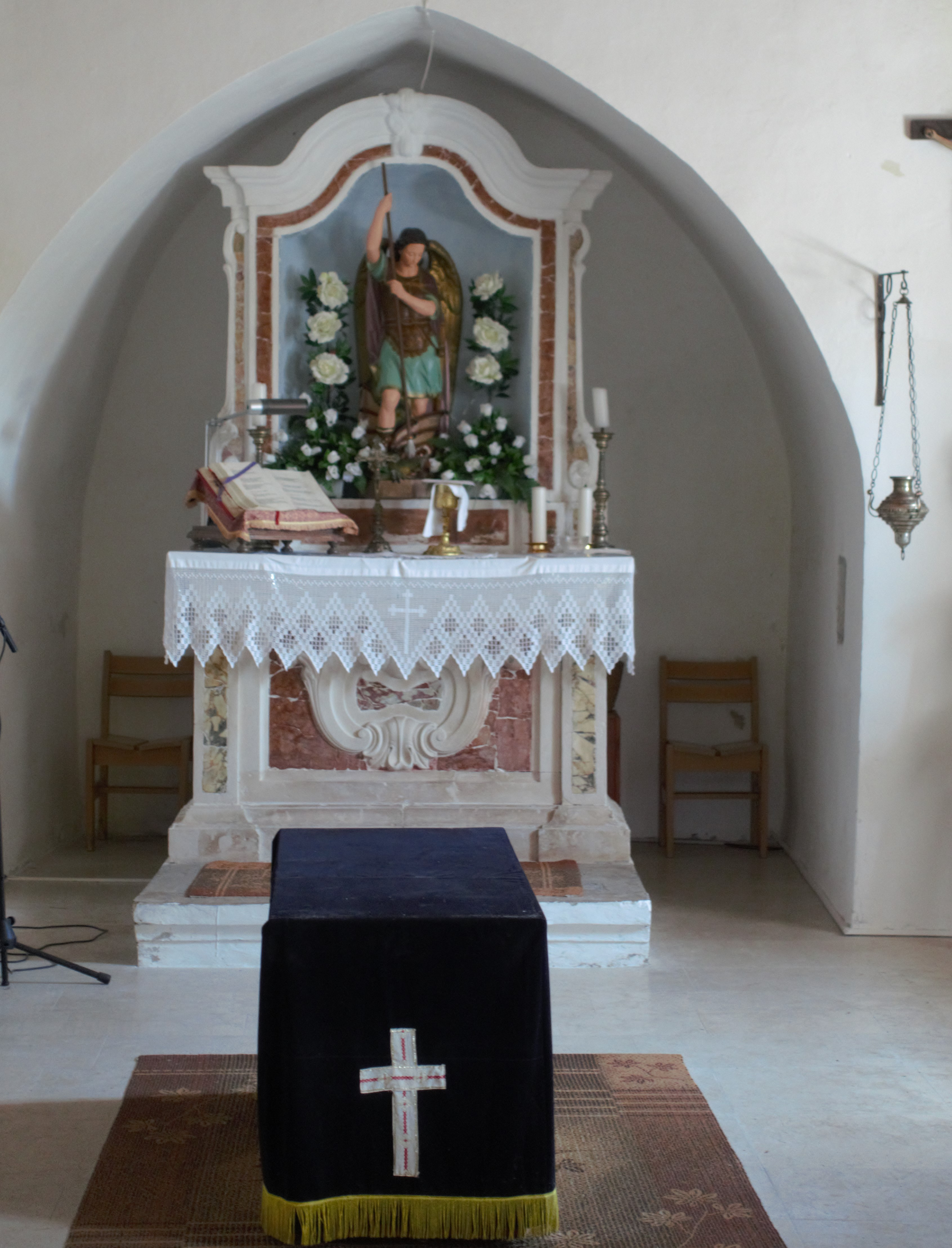
Interior of St. Michael's Church in Klana

The St. Michael's Church (Sveti Mihovil) was built at the end of the 9th and beginning of the 10th century. It is located in Klana's cemetery and unlike St. Hieronymus's Church, it has always had the appearance it has today. The church has a small tower with a bell and inside there is an altar with St. Michael. It was renovated at the beginning of the 19th century and in 1953 the roof was repaired by the conservation institute, under whose protection the church is still today.

During reconstruction of the ground floor in 2004 under the leadership of Mrs. Mie Rizner from the Conservation Department of the Directorate for the Protection of Cultural Heritage, archaeological excavations were carried out in the church during which the tombs of the Barbo and Panizzoli families were found, historical Lords and owners of Klana. It was at last established that Ana Maria Panizzoli (nee Barbo) is buried there. At one time, the church of St. Michael was a parish church but today serves as the church for Masses for the dead during funerals and on All Saints' Day.

=== Chapel of Our Lady of Lourdes ===
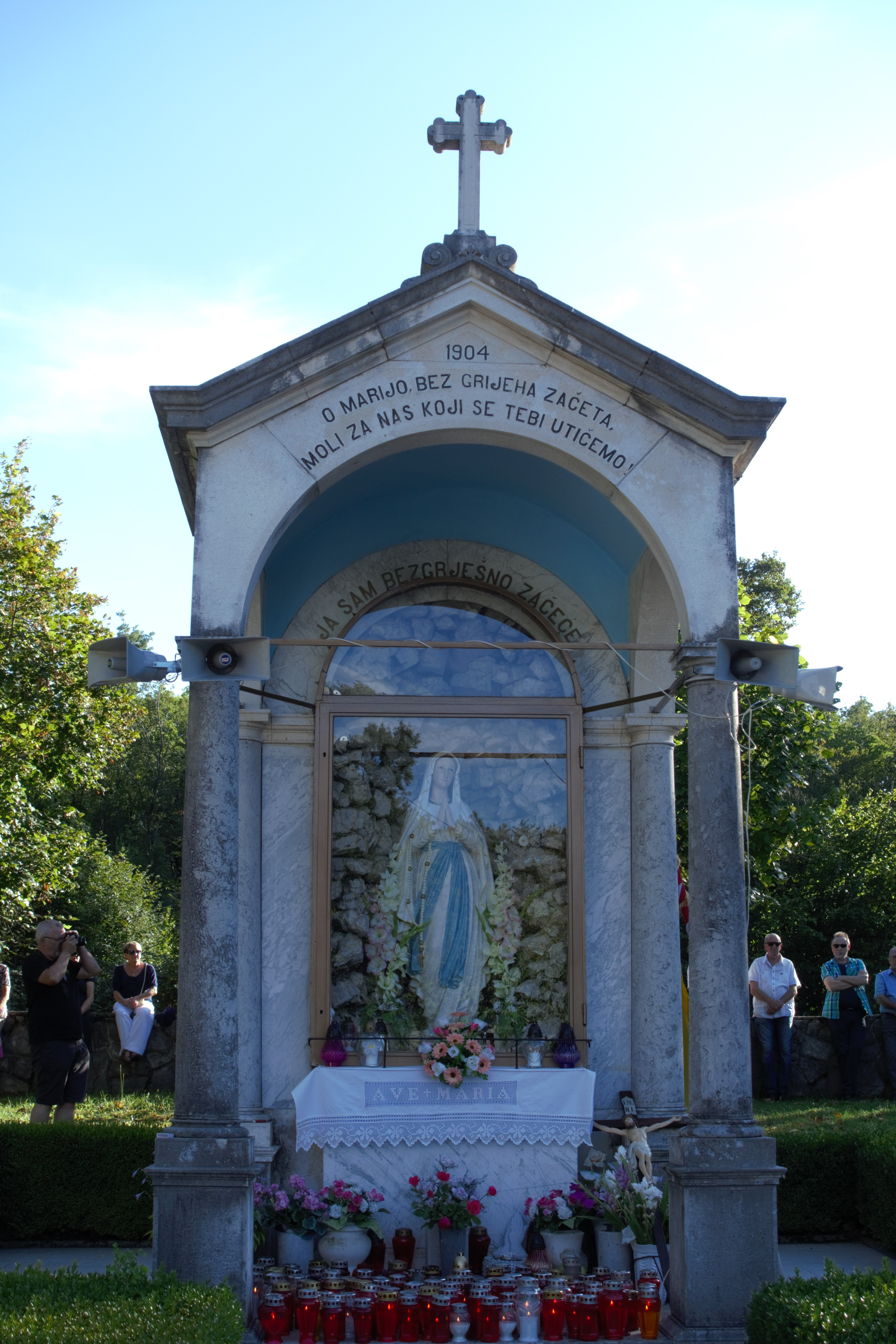
Chapel of Our Lady of Lourdes at Strmašćica in Klana

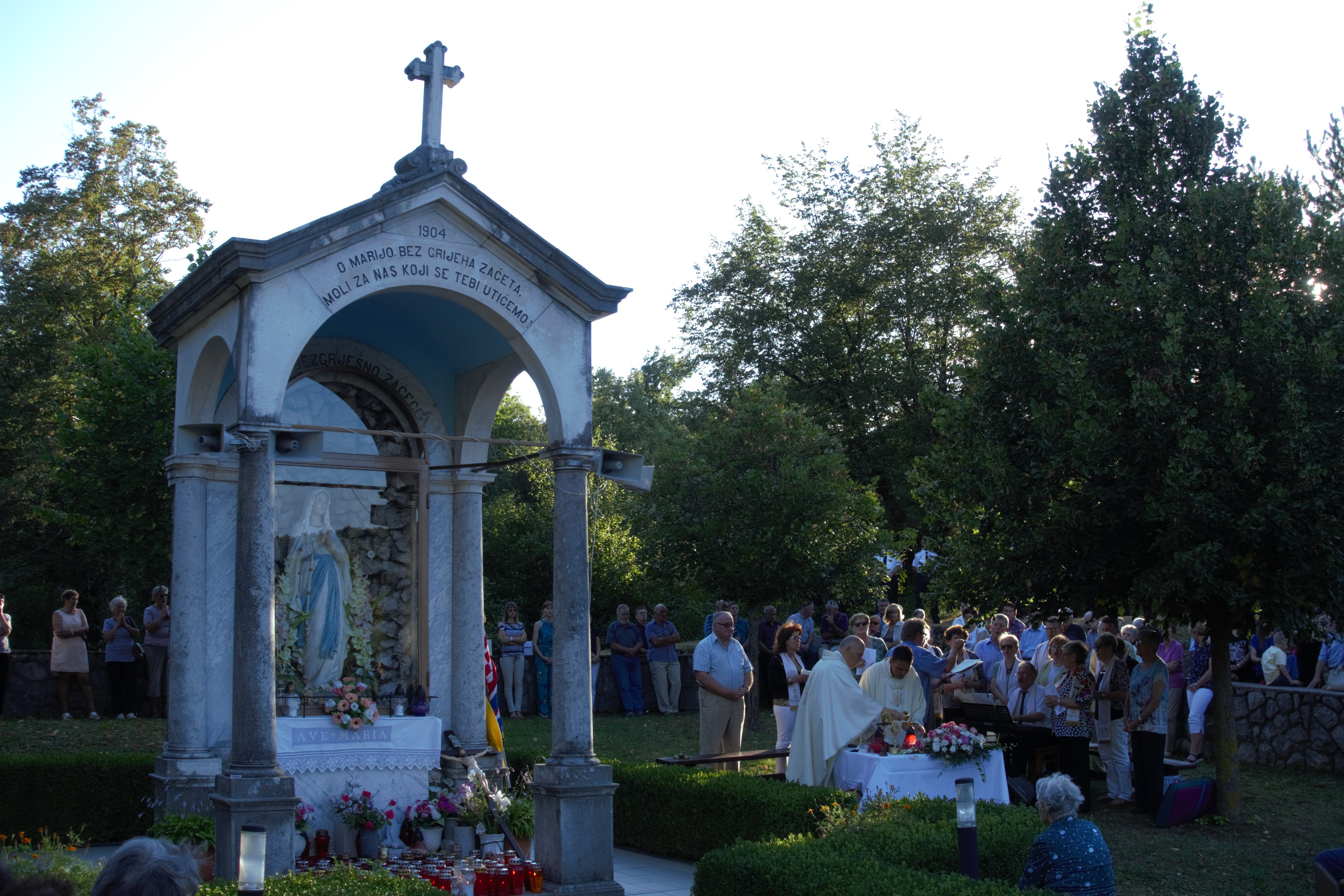
Mass at the Chapel of Strmašćica in Klana

The Chapel of Our Lady of Lourdes (Kapelica Majke Božje Lurdske, Klana dialect: Majka Božja na Strmašćici) was built in 1904 and according to tradition, it was built on the site where Our Lady appeared to Martin Šustar in 1903. This happened in the early morning darkness, while Martin was driving an oxcart to Rijeka for firewood. When he reached the place where the chapel stands today (Strmašćica), he was blinded by a terrible light, above which the Mother of God hovered. She told him to build a chapel in that place, because it is alone on the old road, and she will in turn preserve the place. Martin fainted and the oxen brought him home on their own. The next day he told all this to the parish priest Fr. Koruza, who with the whole town, had a chapel built on the location of the vision.

A few years ago the chapel was restored because a candle caused a fire that damaged it and in 2004 the environment was completely redecorated after a strong wind storm knocked over the tall pines that grew there. It is a true miracle that the chapel remained undamaged.

In 2008, the late Josip Barak (Jožić Mavšin) completely restored the statue of Our Lady. Every day in front of the chapel one can see people who have come to pray, light a candle or simply pray in peace. Some time ago even a wedding was held there. Every year on August 15, on the Feast of the Assumption of the Blessed Virgin Mary, a procession starts from St. Hieronymus's Church in Klana to the chapel at Strmašćica with singing and praying of the rosary, after which a mass is celebrated on the grounds of the chapel.

== Notable people ==
- Matko Laginja (1852-1930), lawyer, politician, Ban (governor) of Croatia (1920)
- Jerko (Jerolim) Gržinčić (1905-1985), Roman Catholic (Salesian) Priest, physicist, mathematician, musician, music director, composer
- Romano Alquati (1929-1975), Italian sociologist, political theorist and activist, co-founder of Quaderni Rossi

== Economy ==
There are a number of industries located in Klana including:

- Šumarija (forestry service)
- Drvna Industrija Klana ("Pilana") (furniture manufacturer)
- KlanaTRANS (trucking/transport)

== Education ==
Education in Klana is offered through Osnovna Škola "Klana" and has kindergarten, elementary, and middle school through the 8th grade.

== Sports ==
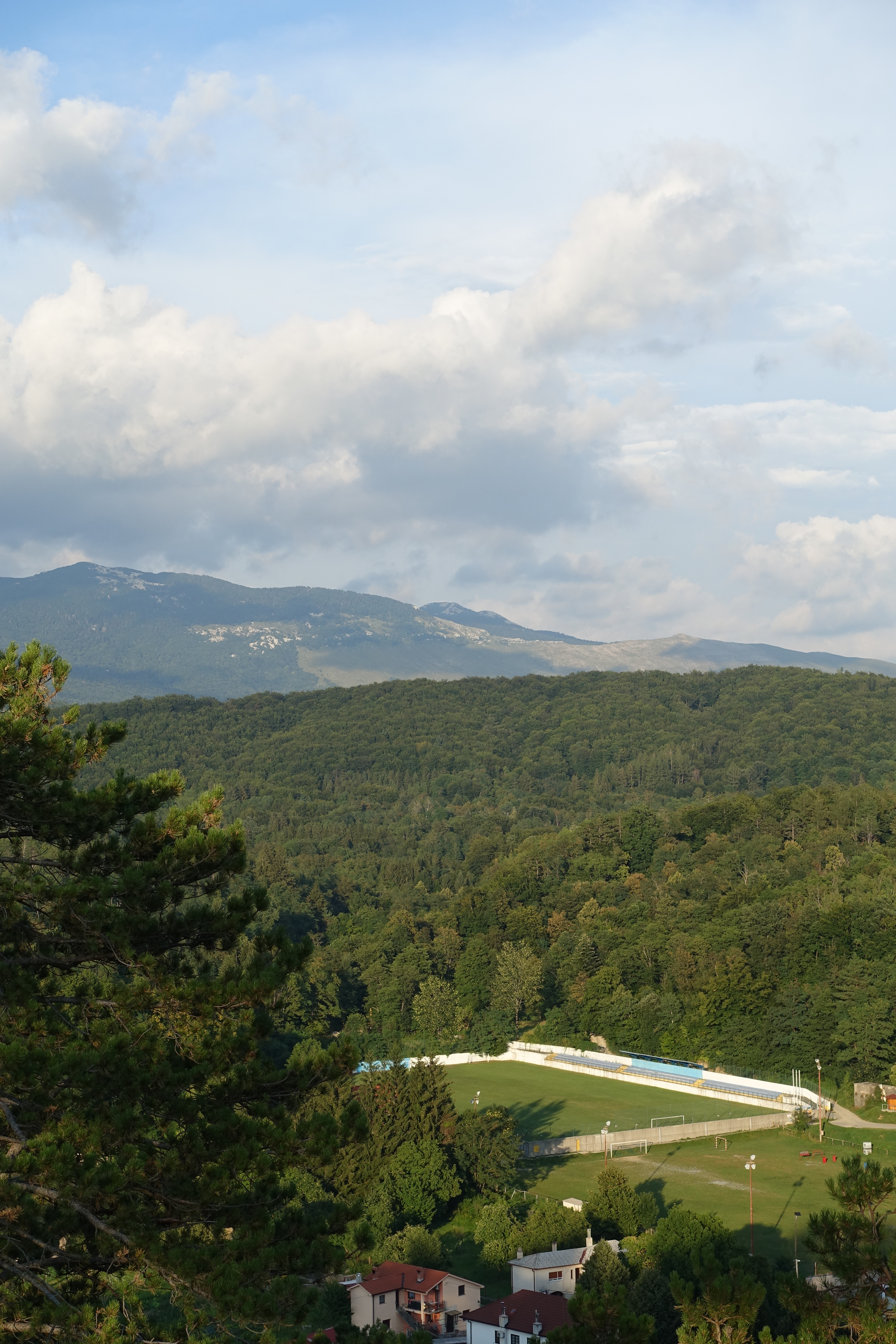
View of the Soccer Stadium in Klana (from Gradina Castle)

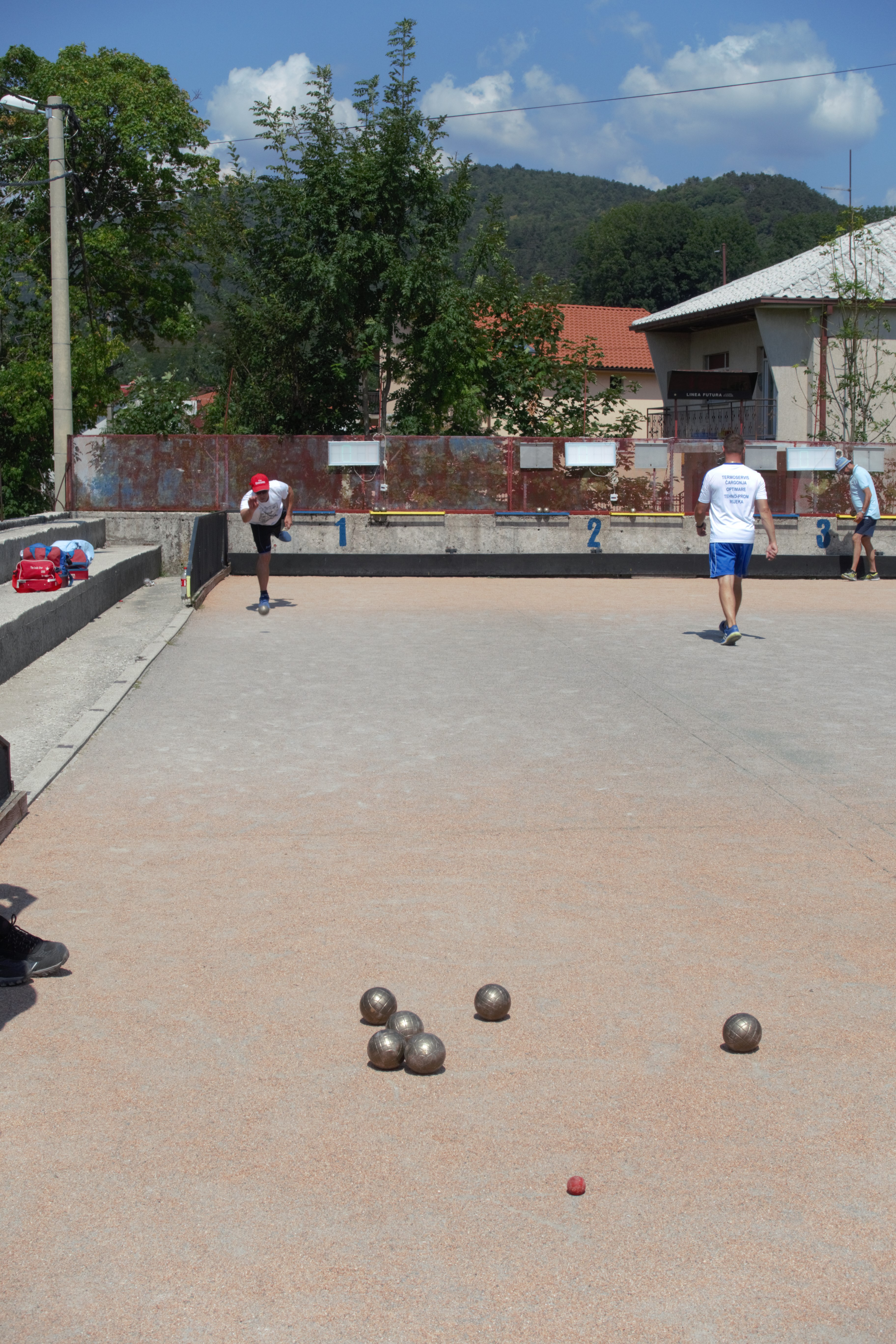
Bocce being played in Klana, 2018

Sport has been a long-standing tradition first started with the introduction of soccer (football) by the Italian occupying army and the birth of the local soccer team in 1931. Since then, other sports were popularized amid the formation of formal team representation. Another long-standing sports tradition is bocce, which has been played in Klana on bocce courts adjacent to the various bars and restaurants in town. A team was formed in 1974 bocce club "Klana". The Sveti Rok bowling club currently plays out of Klana.
