= Slavko Šajber =

Croatian politician and football official

- Born: 25 February 1929; Gradina, Kingdom of Serbs, Croats and Slovenes (now Croatia)
- Died: 3 November 2003 (aged 74); Zagreb, Croatia

Slavko Šajber (25 February 1929 – 3 November 2003) was a Croatian politician, football official and former president of the Football Association of Yugoslavia.

== Early life ==
Šajber was born in Gradina, near Virovitica, to a Jewish family, German: Scheiber. His family suffered terrible devastation during the Holocaust, 37 of its 42 members have been killed by Ustaše.

== Business career and sports administration ==
From an early age he worked at the Rade Končar factory where he started as a laborer. While working he completed his undergraduate studies, getting a bachelor's degree in economics at the University of Zagreb.

For many years he was director of the Slavija Lloyd insurance company.

In November 1976, as a general secretary of the Zagreb city committee, he renamed KK Lokomotiva into KK Cibona. That same year Šajber started the project of creating a great basketball team with KK Cibona, and has gathered main sponsors for the club, four Croatia-based food industry giants: Kraš, Franck, Badel and Voće. After that KK Cibona begins its climb to the European throne, in 1985 and 1986 club has won the Euroleague.

Šajber is most remembered when he, as president of the Football Association of Yugoslavia, overturned the last round of 1985-1986 Yugoslav First League championship due to widespread match fixing. After the last week was played, FK Partizan was crowned champion due to better goal difference than second-placed Red Star Belgrade. However, after weeks of public pressure and huge public outcry, on 20 June 1986, the Yugoslav FA presidency headed by Šajber decided to impose extraordinary measures that included the following:

- voiding the already played week 34 matches of the 1985–86 season and ordering a replay of every single one (nine fixtures in total)
- docking 6 points from each of the 12 clubs suspected of being involved in match-fixing, meaning they would start the following league season (1986–87) with -6 points

Each club agreed to play the replay except for FK Partizan. As a result, its week 34 fixture was registered as a 0–3 loss, and the club was thus stripped of the league title, which was now awarded to Red Star.

After the introduction of multy-party political system and the 1990 parliamentary elections in Croatia, Šajber withdrew from public life.

== Death ==
Šajber died after long illness on 3 November 2003 in Zagreb, and was buried at the Mirogoj Cemetery.
