= Žaočani =

- Village
- Location within Serbia
- Coordinates: 43°46′56″N 20°27′32″E
- Country: Serbia
- District: Moravica District
- Municipality: Čačak

Area
  - Total: 4.93 km^{2} (1.90 sq mi)
- Elevation: 320 m (1,050 ft)

Population (2011)
  - Total: 332
  - Density: 67.3/km^{2} (174/sq mi)
- Time zone: UTC+1 (CET)
  - Summer (DST): UTC+2 (CEST)

Žaočani is a village in the municipality of Čačak, Serbia. According to the 2011 census, the village had a population of 332 people.
