= Anne Scheiber =

Left $22 mln to Yeshiva University

- Born: October 1, 1893
- Died: January 9, 1995 (aged 101)
- Occupations: Estate auditor; philanthropist
- Employer: Internal Revenue Service
- Known for: Bequeathed US$22 million to Yeshiva University

Anne Scheiber (October 1, 1893 – January 9, 1995) was an American IRS auditor and philanthropist who, over 50 years of retirement, secretly amassed significant wealth and upon her death donated it all—US$22 million—to Yeshiva University for scholarships for women. She never earned a salary of more than $4,000 per year until her 1944 retirement and lived frugally in a rent-controlled apartment, letting her investments grow through a tax-efficient "buy and hold" approach.

== Career ==
Scheiber implemented a "buy and hold" philosophy of investing in businesses, reaping the benefits of a tax-efficient strategy of investing in high quality companies for long-term growth, and selling few of her investments during her lifetime, thus avoiding significant tax payments on capital gains. Upon bequeathal of her entire fortune to Yeshiva University at the time of her death, she ensured that little taxes were ever paid to her former employer, other than small payments on dividends and on her modest pension.

Her executor, Benjamin Clark, said that the claims about Scheiber's investing skill have been exaggerated. Her 1936 tax return showed dividend income of $900, which would indicate she had a substantial portfolio several years before her retirement. If her stocks earned an average dividend yield for 1936, her portfolio would have been about $21,000. Investing $21,000 for almost 60 years and winding up with $22 million indicates a return slightly higher than the S&P 500.
