= Kačulice =

- Village
- Interactive map of Kačulice
- Coordinates: 43°46′27″N 20°29′15″E
- Country: Serbia
- Municipality: Čačak

Area
  - Total: 10.57 km^{2} (4.08 sq mi)
- Elevation: 266 m (873 ft)

Population (2011)
  - Total: 569
  - Density: 53.8/km^{2} (139/sq mi)
- Time zone: UTC+1 (CET)
  - Summer (DST): UTC+2 (CEST)

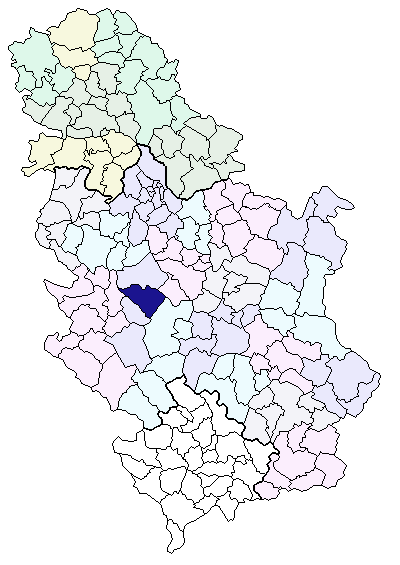
Location of the municipality of Čačak in Serbia

Kačulice (Serbian Cyrillic: Качулице) is a village in the municipality of Čačak in the Moravica District of Serbia. The village is approximately 15 km east of the city of Čačak, and has a population of less than 700.
