= Breza, Kolašin =

Breza Бреза
- Village
- Location within Montenegro
- Coordinates: 42.828352°N 19.519963°E
- Country: Montenegro
- Region: Northern
- Municipality: Kolašin

Population (2011)
  - Total: 401
- Time zone: UTC+1 (CET)
  - Summer (DST): UTC+2 (CEST)

Breza (Montenegrin Cyrillic: Бреза) is a village in the municipality of Kolašin, Montenegro.

== Demographics ==
According to the 2011 census, its population was 401.

Ethnicity in 2011
Ethnicity	Number	Percentage
Montenegrins	209	52.1%
Serbs	160	39.9%
other/undeclared	32	8.0%
Total	401	100%
