= Brezovica, Virovitica-Podravina County =

Village in Virovitica-Podravina County, Croatia

Brezovica
- Village
- Interactive map of Brezovica
- Coordinates: 45°51′44″N 17°33′35″E
- Country: Croatia
- County: Virovitica-Podravina

Population (2011)
  - Total: 595

Brezovica is a village near Gradina, Virovitica-Podravina County, Croatia. In the 2011 census, it had 595 inhabitants.
