= Breza, Primorje-Gorski Kotar County =

Settlement in Primorje-Gorski Kotar County, Croatia

Breza
- Settlement
- Interactive map of Breza
- Location of Breza in Croatia
- Coordinates: 45°25′21″N 14°20′43″E
- Country: Croatia
- County: Primorje-Gorski Kotar
- Municipality: Klana

Area
  - Total: 17.5 km^{2} (6.8 sq mi)

Population (2021)
  - Total: 53
  - Density: 3.0/km^{2} (7.8/sq mi)
- Time zone: UTC+1 (CET)
  - Summer (DST): UTC+2 (CEST)
- Postal code: 51217 Klana

Breza is a settlement in the Municipality of Klana in Croatia. In 2021, its population was 53.

== Demographics ==
Breza: Population trends 1857–2021
v

population	73		113	144	146	135	158	162	103	91	83	69	59	54	53	60	53
	1857	1869	1880	1890	1900	1910	1921	1931	1948	1953	1961	1971	1981	1991	2001	2011	2021

Sources: Croatian Bureau of Statistics publications
