= Premeća =

- Village
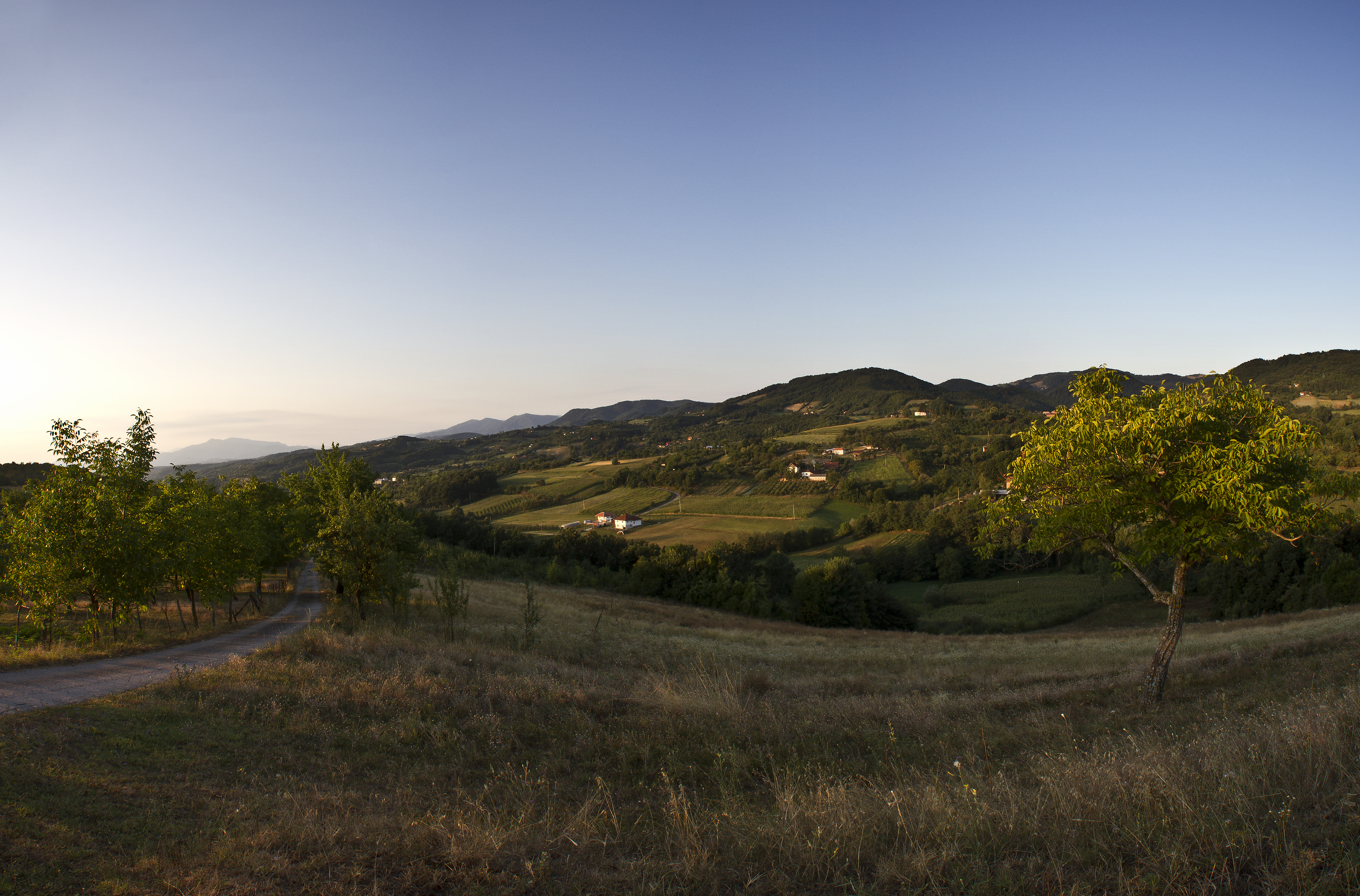

- Location within Serbia
- Coordinates: 43°46′33″N 20°25′34″E
- Country: Serbia
- District: Moravica District
- Municipality: Čačak

Area
  - Total: 10.04 km^{2} (3.88 sq mi)
- Elevation: 387 m (1,270 ft)

Population (2011)
  - Total: 238
  - Density: 23.7/km^{2} (61.4/sq mi)
- Time zone: UTC+1 (CET)
  - Summer (DST): UTC+2 (CEST)

Premeća is a village in the municipality of Čačak, Serbia. According to the 2011 census, the village has a population of 238 people.
