= Brezovice (Valjevo) =

Brezovice Брезовице
- Village
- Location within Serbia
- Coordinates: 44°10′N 19°43′E
- Country: Serbia
- District: Kolubara District
- Municipality: Valjevo

Population (2002)
  - Total: 506
- Time zone: UTC+1 (CET)
  - Summer (DST): UTC+2 (CEST)

Brezovice is a village in the municipality of Valjevo, Serbia. According to the 2002 census, the village has a population of 506 people.

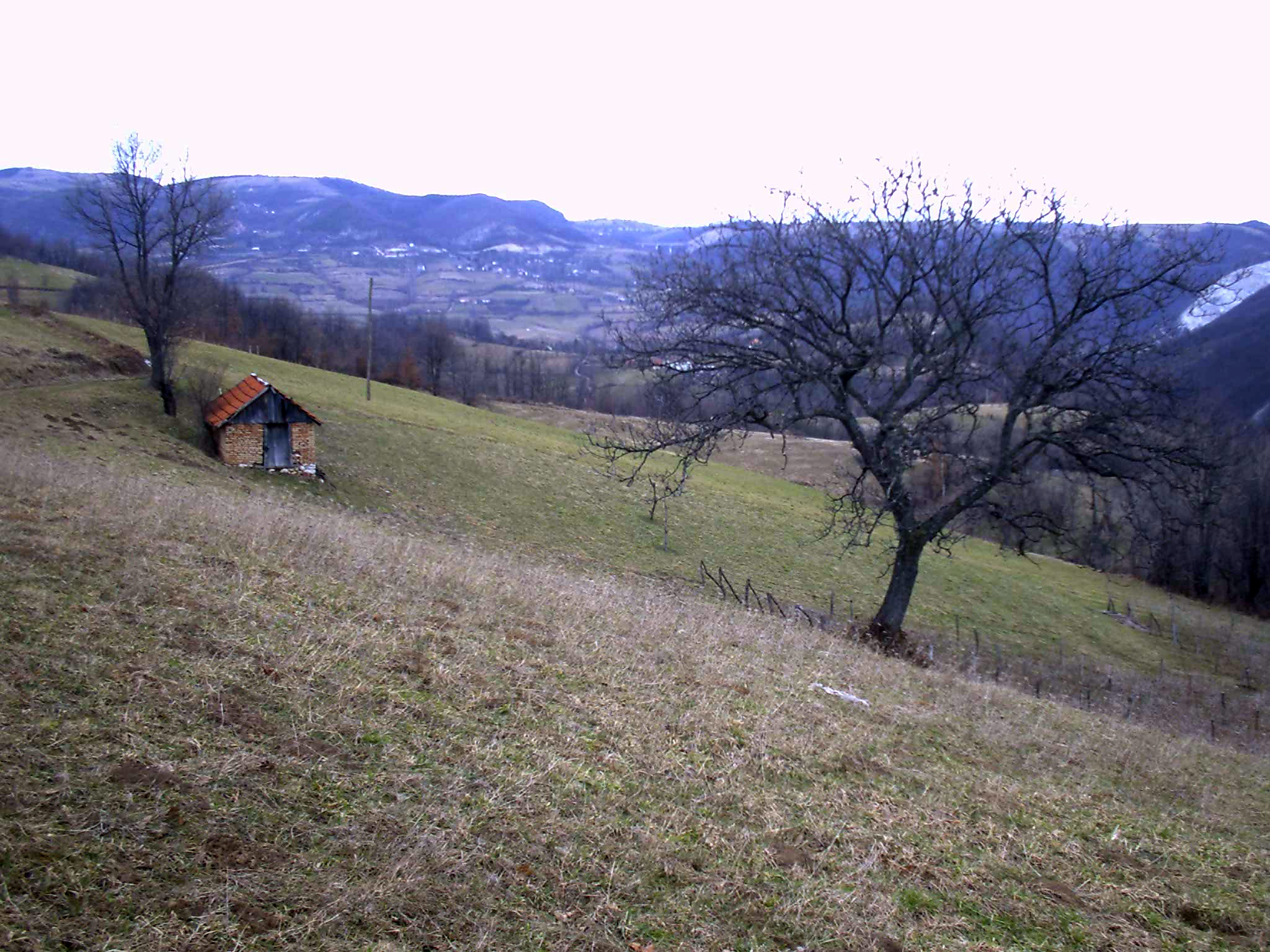
Brezovice - panorama

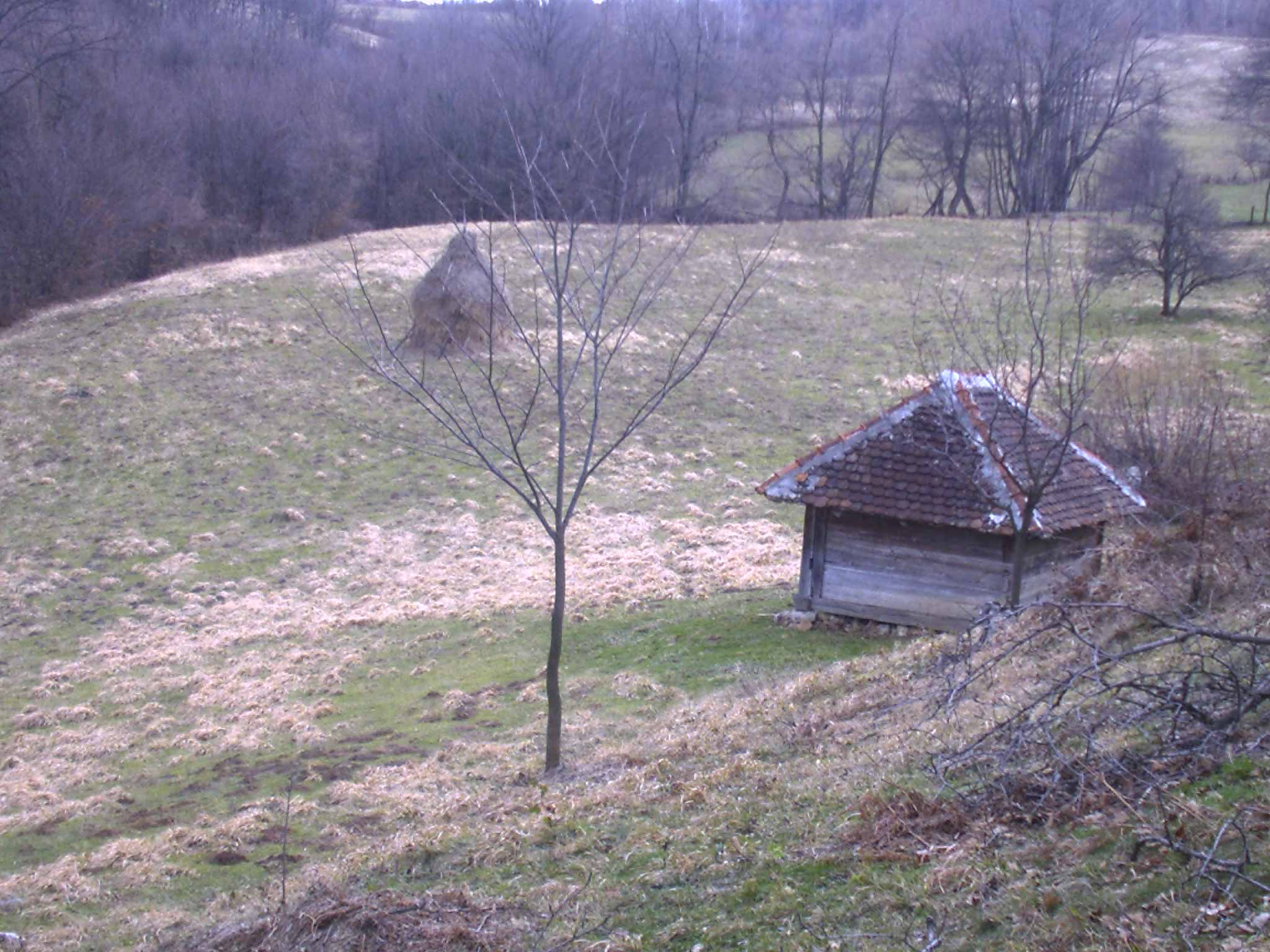
Brezovice - panorama

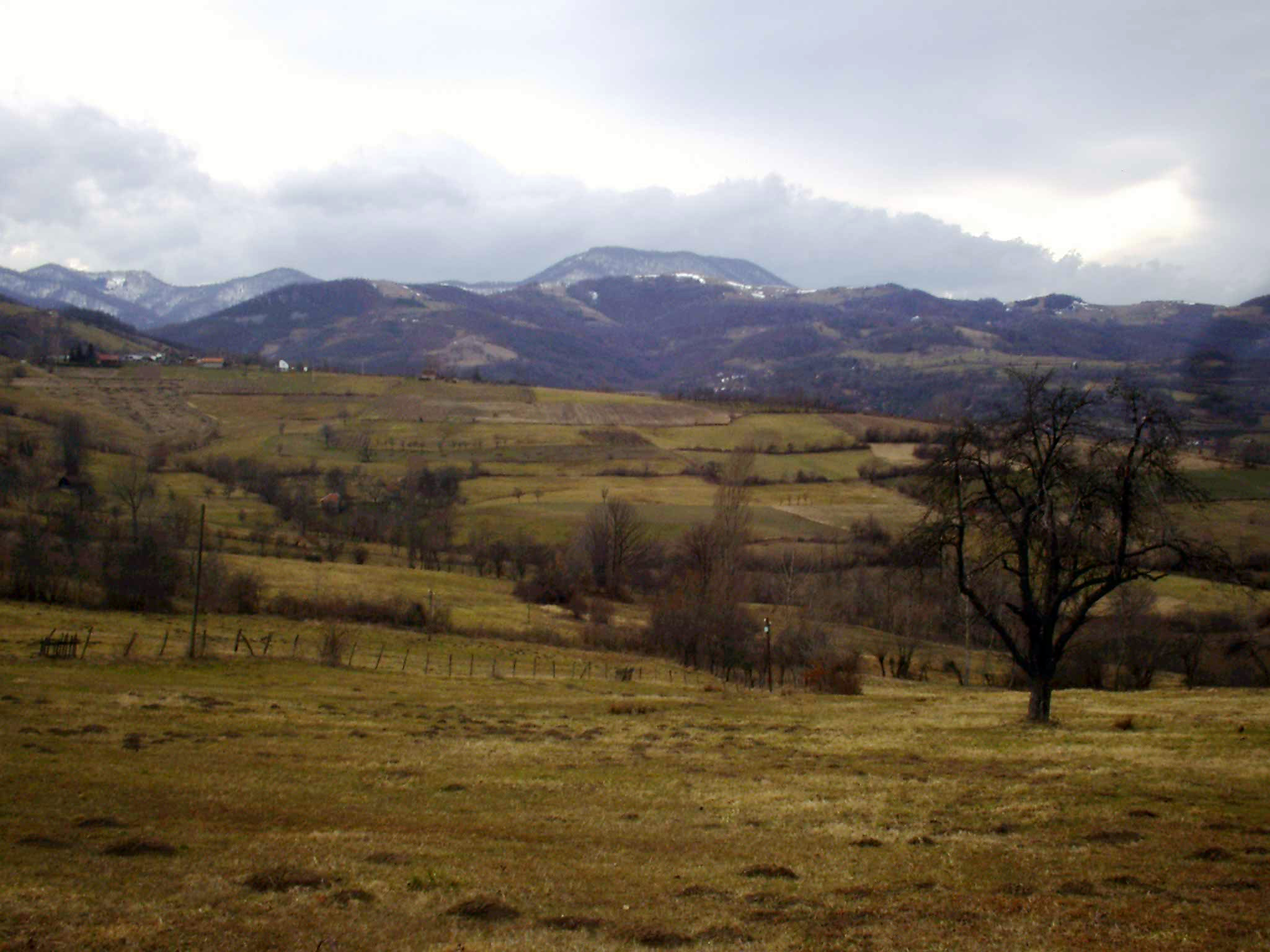
Brezovice - panorama

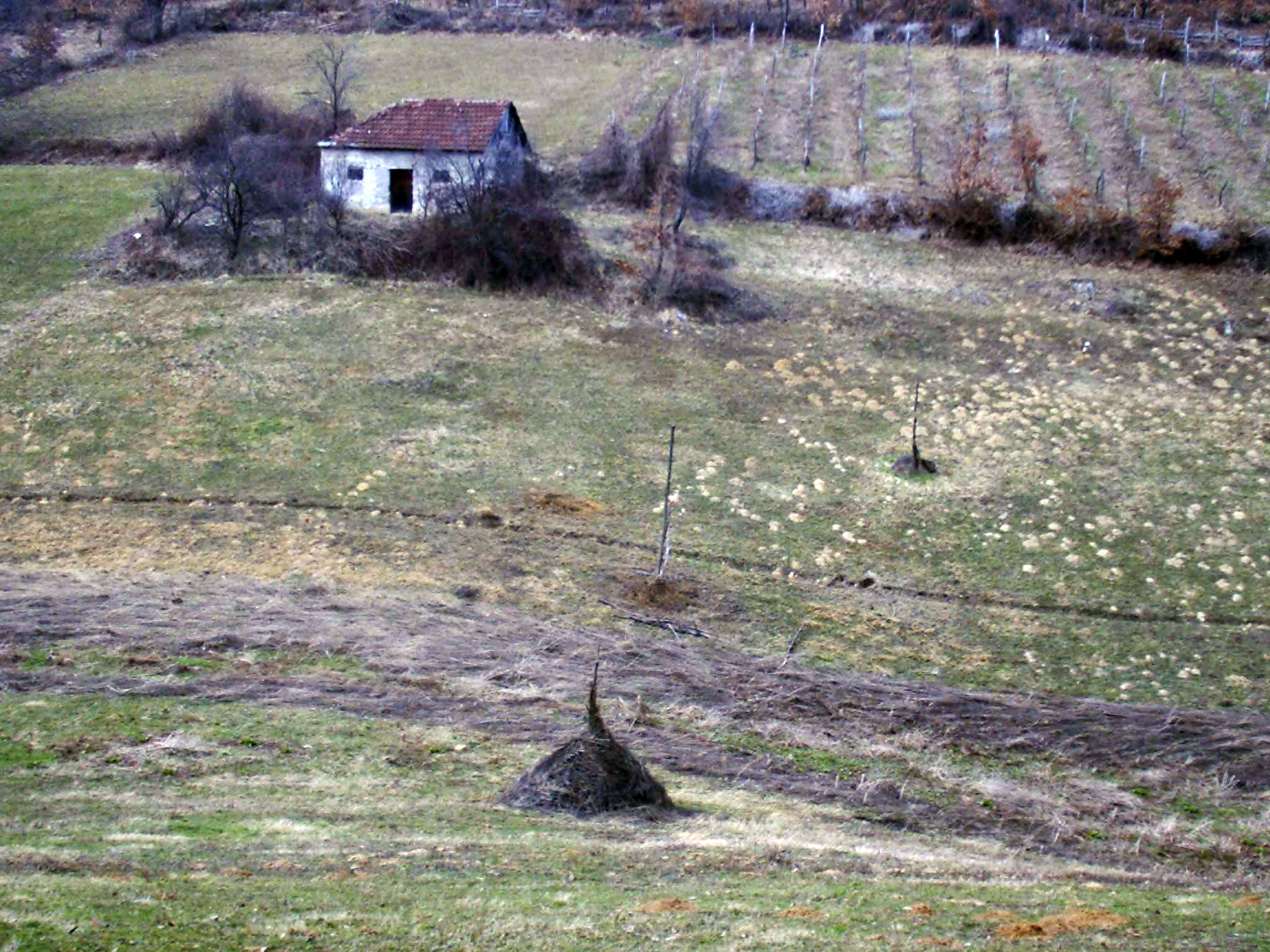
Brezovice - panorama

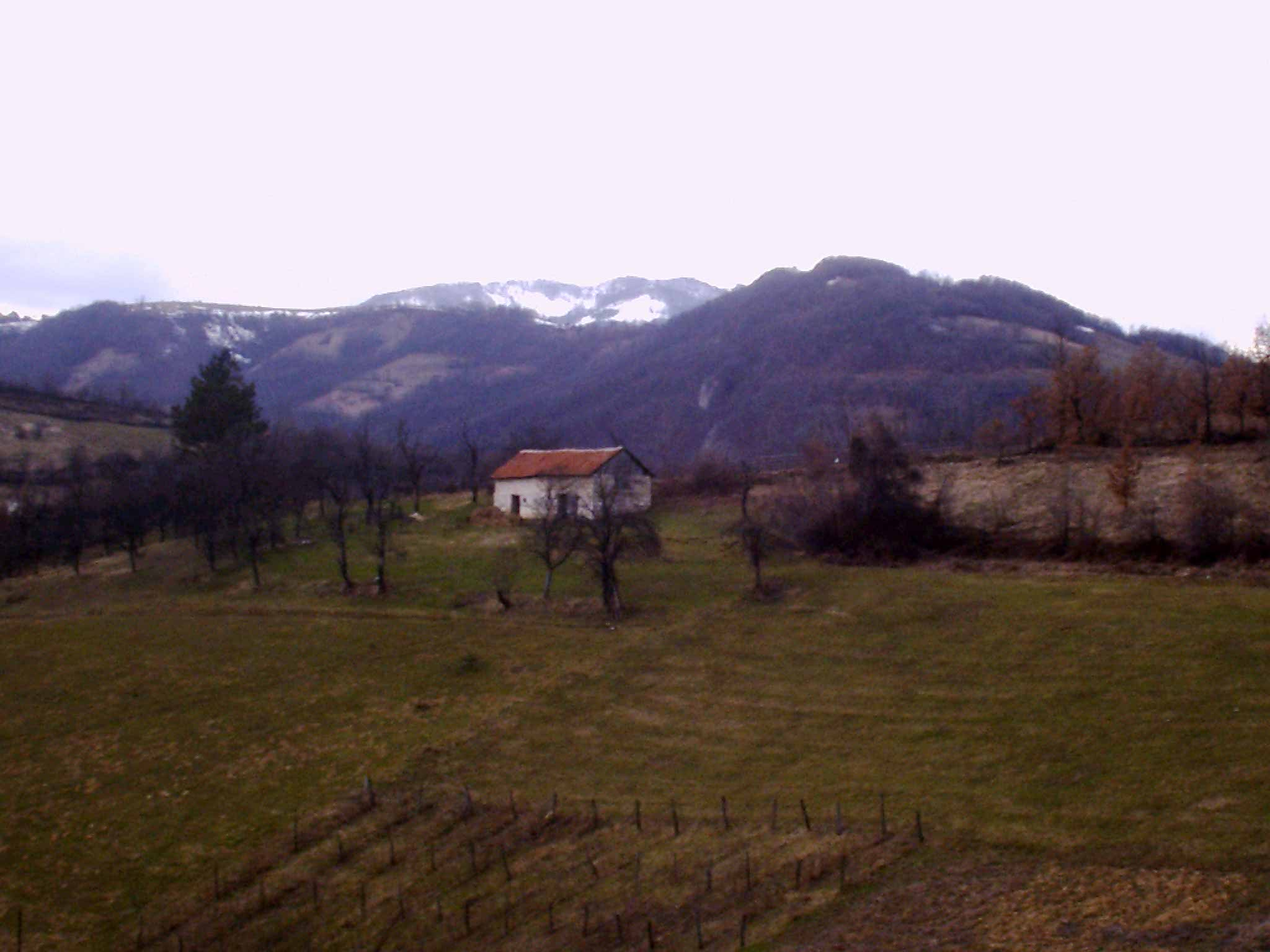
Brezovice - panorama

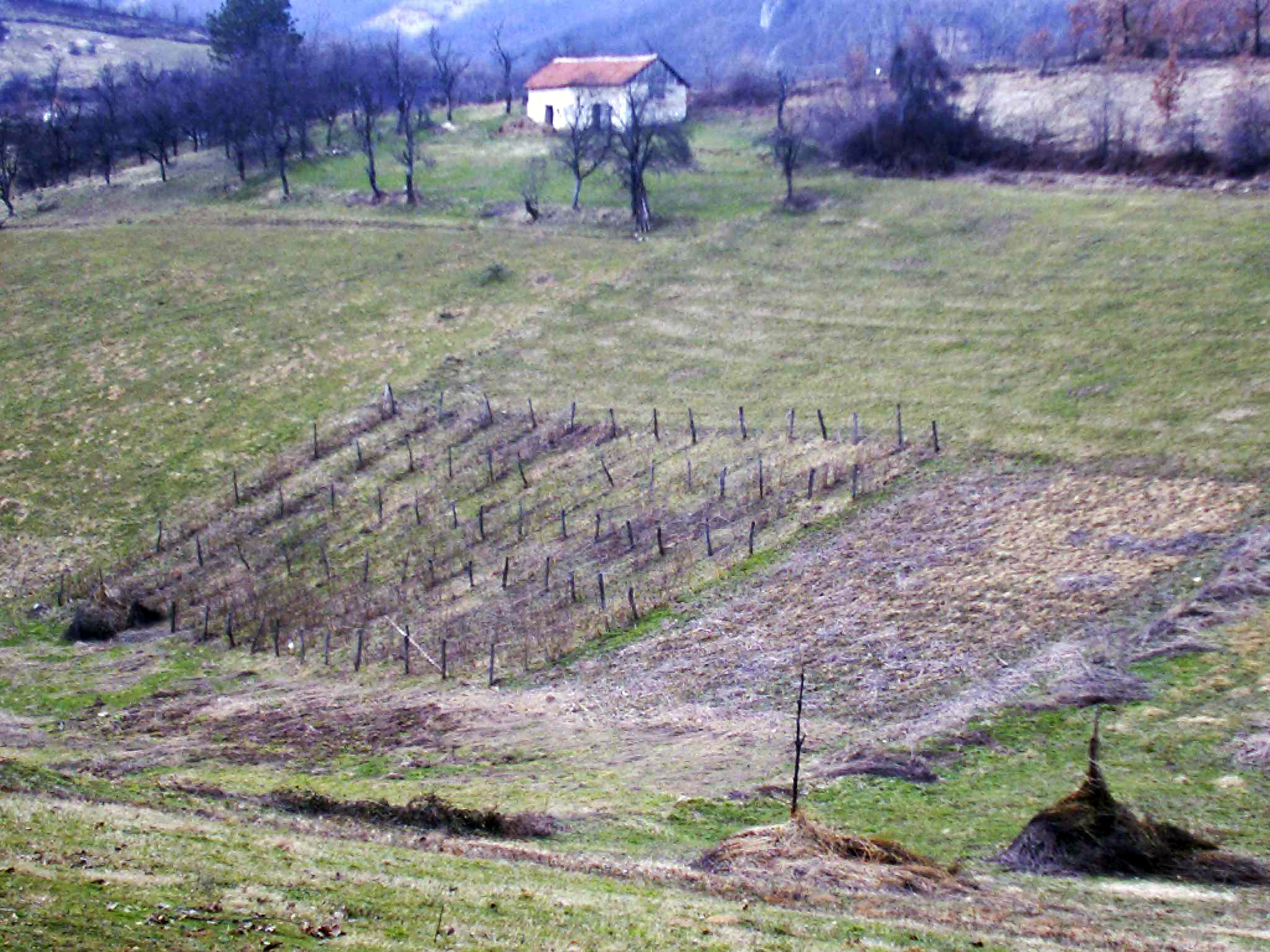
Brezovice - panorama

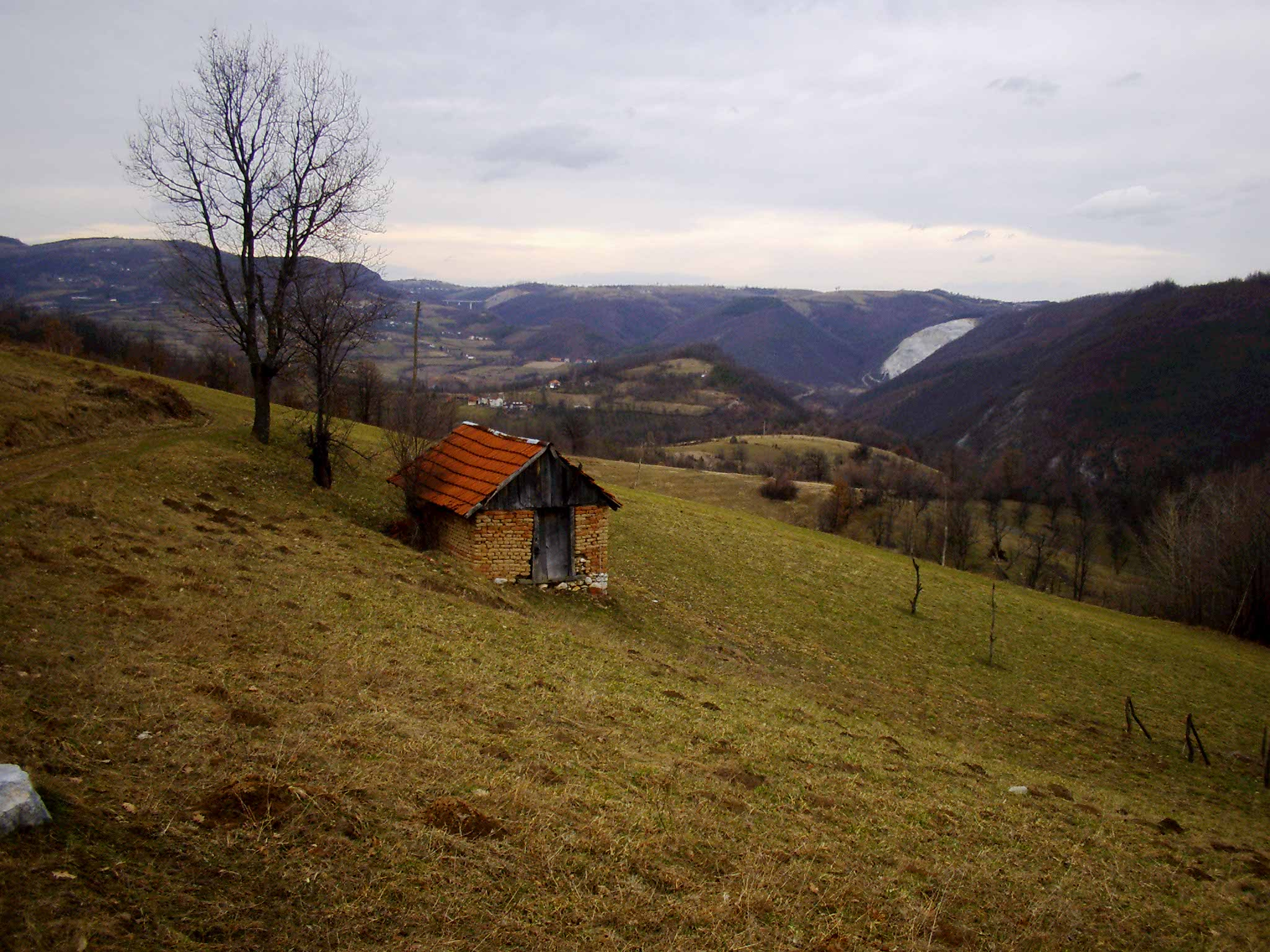
Brezovice - panorama
