= Brezovac, Aranđelovac =

Coordinates: 44°15′06″N 20°35′07″E

Brezovac Брезовац
- Village
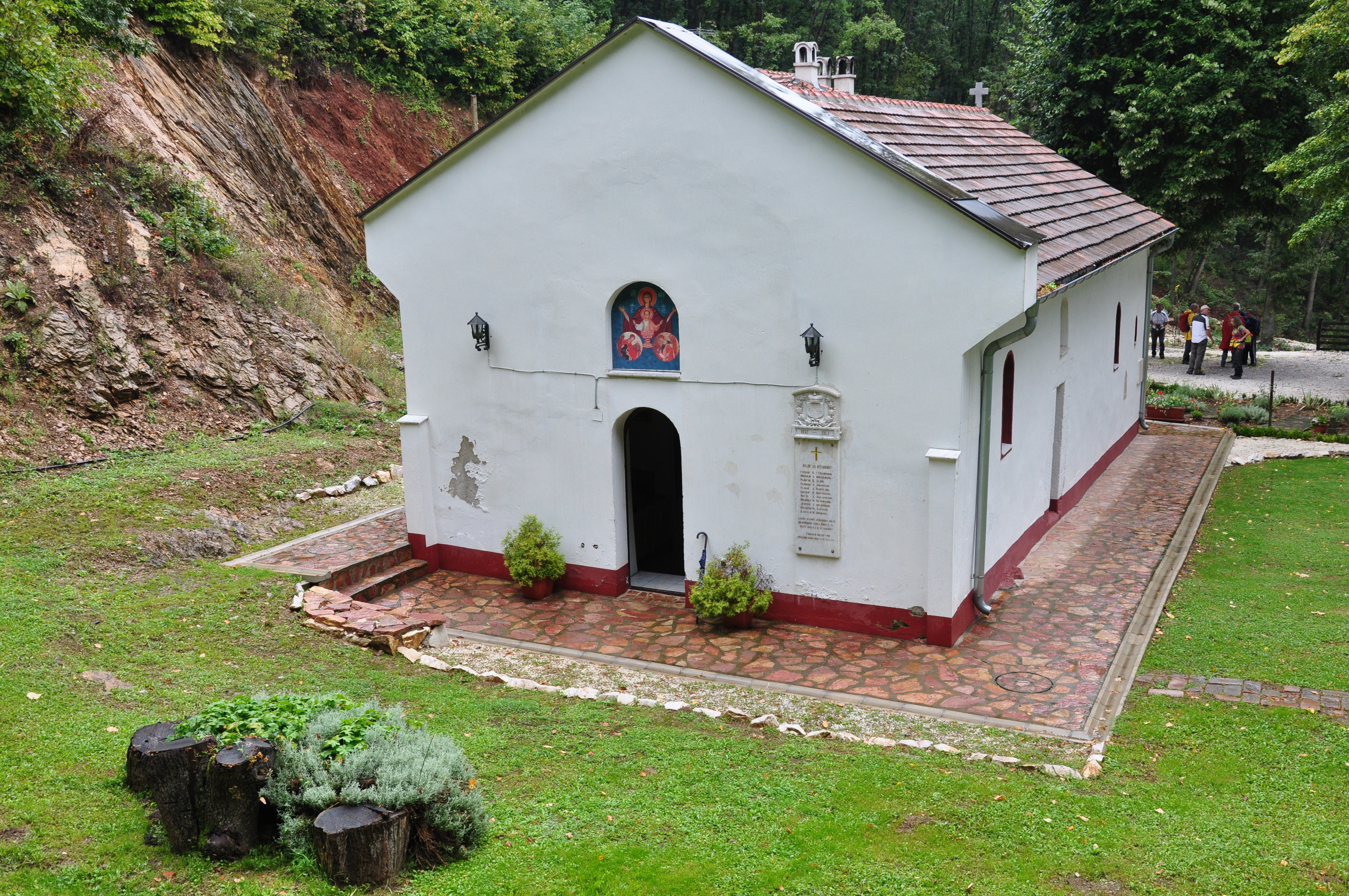
- Church of St. Archangel Michael in Brezovac
- Interactive map of Brezovac
- Country: Serbia
- District: Šumadija
- Municipality: Aranđelovac

Population (2011)
  - Total: 688
- Time zone: UTC+1 (CET)
  - Summer (DST): UTC+2 (CEST)

Brezovac (Serbian Cyrillic: Брезовац, pronounced [brezoʋats]) is a village in the municipality of Aranđelovac, Serbia. According to the 2011 census, the village has a population of 688 people.
