= Brezovica, Čačak =

Brezovica Брезовица
- Village
- Location within Serbia
- Coordinates: 43°44′55″N 20°24′48″E
- Country: Serbia
- District: Moravica District
- Municipality: Čačak

Area
  - Total: 7.47 km^{2} (2.88 sq mi)
- Elevation: 586 m (1,923 ft)

Population (2011)
  - Total: 90
  - Density: 12/km^{2} (31/sq mi)
- Time zone: UTC+1 (CET)
  - Summer (DST): UTC+2 (CEST)

Brezovica (Serbian Cyrillic: Брезовица) is a village in the municipality of Čačak, Serbia. According to the 2011 census, the village has a population of 90 people.
