= Rajac =

Rajac can refer to the following places in Serbia:

- Rajac (mountain), part of Suvobor
- Rajac (Čačak), a village near Čačak
- Rajac (Negotin), a village near Negotin
