= Rajac (Čačak) =

Rajac Рајац
- Village
- Location within Serbia
- Coordinates: 43°46′32″N 20°12′37″E
- Country: Serbia
- District: Moravica District
- Municipality: Čačak

Area
  - Total: 9.8 km^{2} (3.8 sq mi)
- Elevation: 59 m (194 ft)

Population (2011)
  - Total: 303
  - Density: 31/km^{2} (80/sq mi)
- Time zone: UTC+1 (CET)
  - Summer (DST): UTC+2 (CEST)

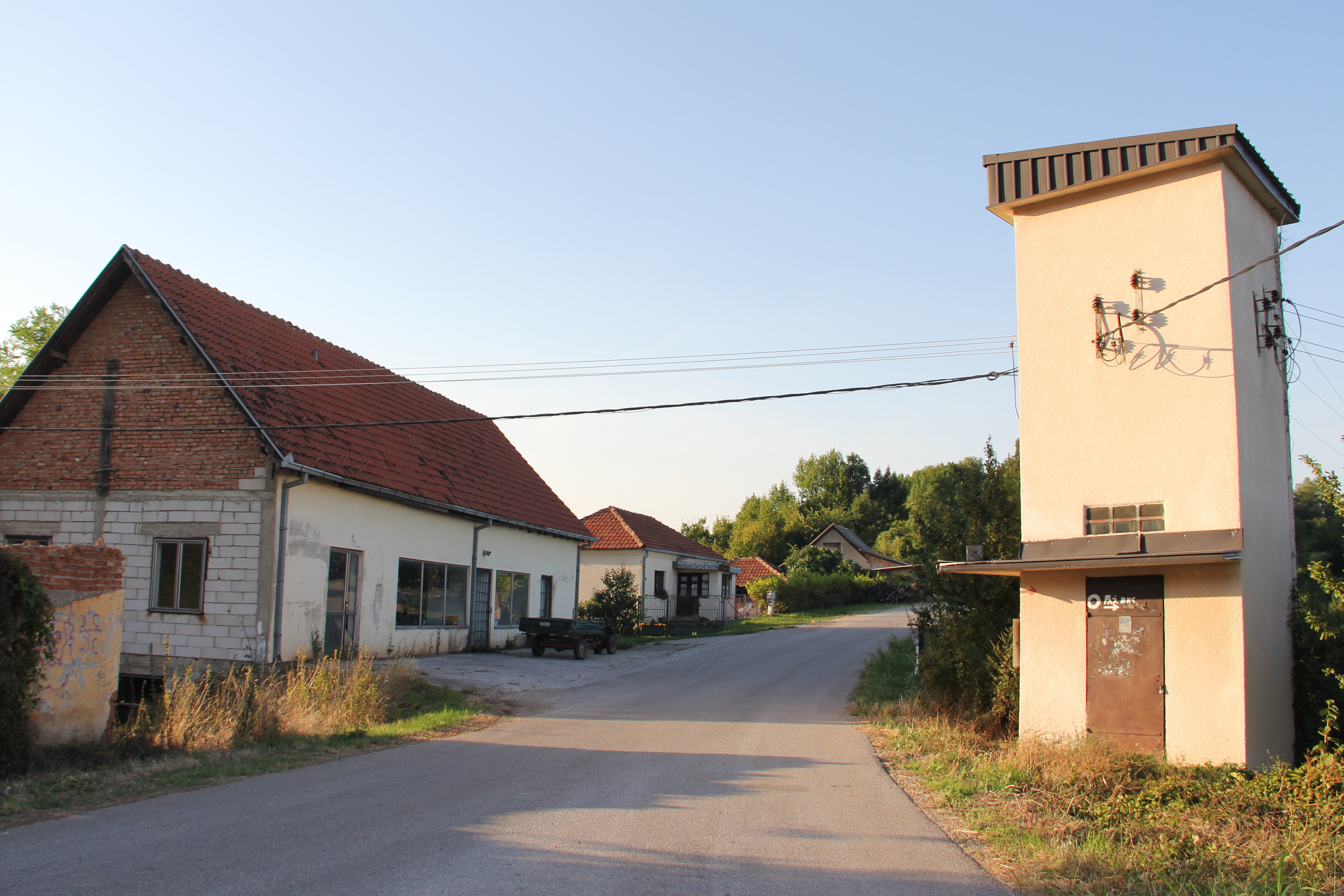
street in Rajac

Rajac is a village in the municipality of Čačak, Serbia. According to the 2011 census, the village has a population of 303 people.
