= Devet grla =

Devet grla Девет грла
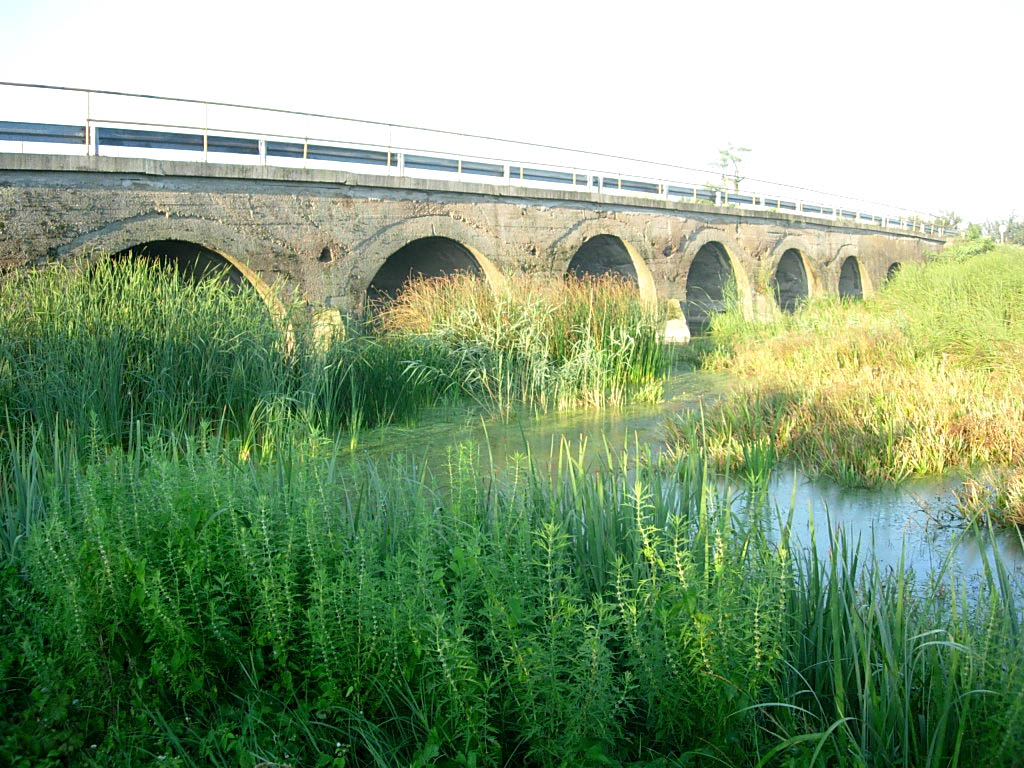
- Coordinates: 45°58′3″N 20°18′58″E
- Carries: State Road 104

Characteristics
- Total length: 84 metres (276 ft)
- No. of spans: 9

History
- Construction end: 1860

Location
- Interactive map of Devet grla

Devet grla (Serbian Cyrillic: Девет грла, meaning Nine throats) is a stone and mortar arch bridge over the Aranca river near Mokrin, Serbia. The State Road 104 (section 10404 Crna Bara – Kikinda) passes over the bridge. The border between the City of Kikinda and the Municipality of Čoka lies on the bridge.

The bridge was built in 1860 by the authorities of the Austrian Empire. It is named "Nine throats" because of its nine arches.

== Sources ==
- "Devet grla, od mosta do ćuprije, i obratno". kikinda.org.rs (in Serbian). 28 April 2010.
- Đuran, A. (12 October 2014). "Награђена прича о мосту Девет грла" (in Serbian). Dnevnik.
