= Aranca =

Aranca Zlatica (Златица)
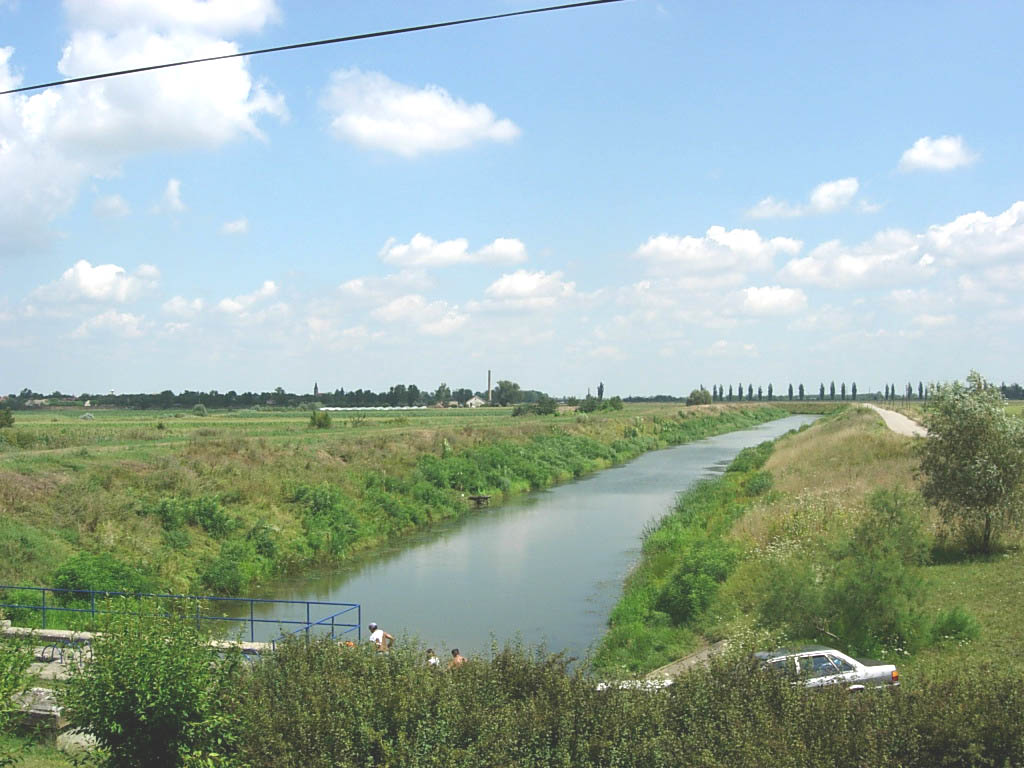
- Zlatica River at Padej (Serbia)

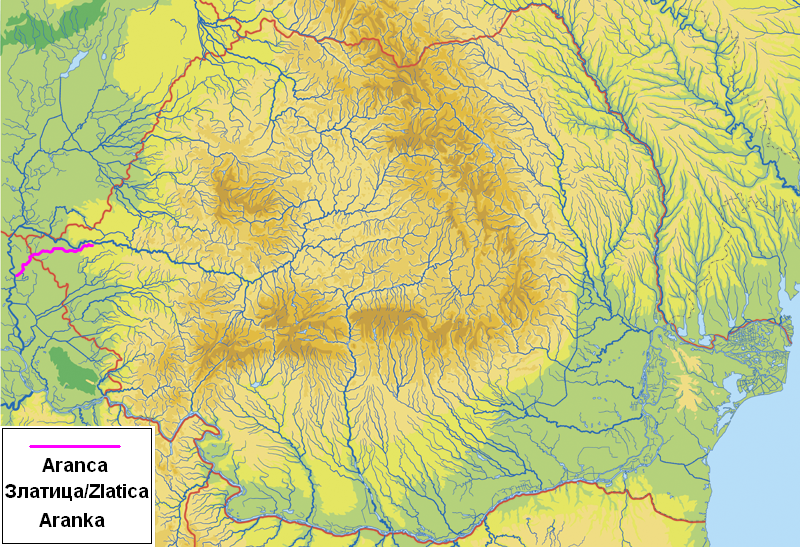

Location
- Country: Romania (Arad County, Timiș County); Serbia (Vojvodina Province)

Physical characteristics
- Mouth: Tisa
  - location: Ada, Serbia
  - coordinates: 45.8122°N 20.1482°E
- Length: 117 km (73 mi)
- Basin size: 1,470 km^{2} (570 sq mi)

Basin features
- Progression: Tisza→ Danube→ Black Sea
- Tributaries
  - left: Giucoșin
  - right: Igriș, Mureșan, Cociohat

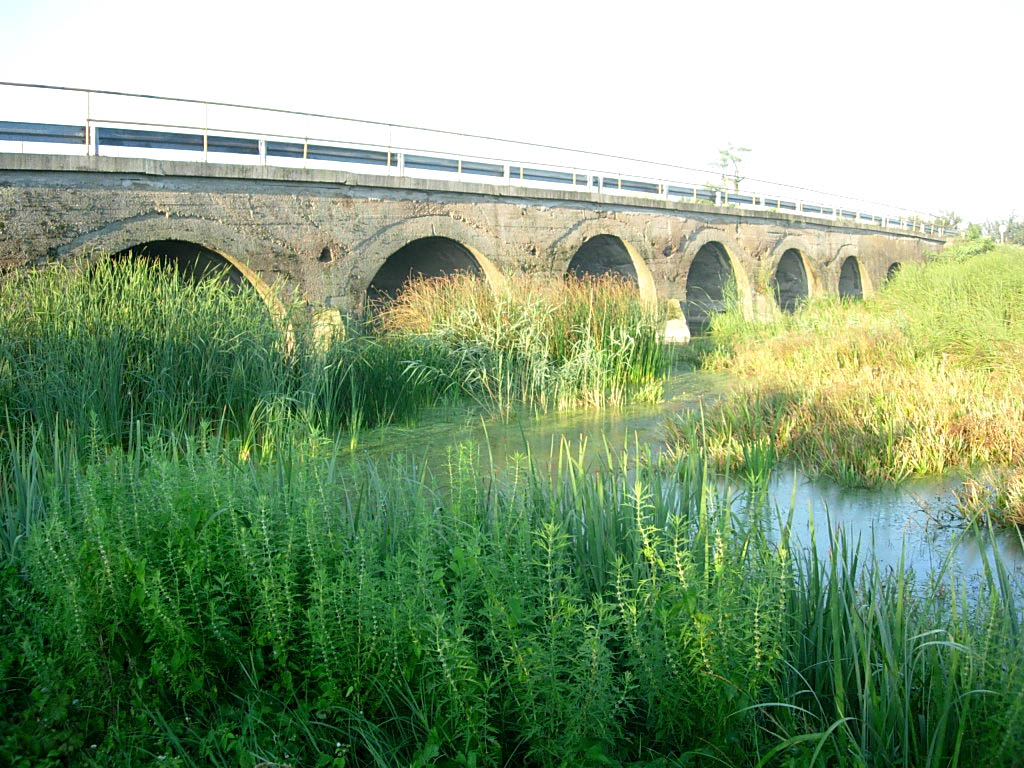
Devet grla bridge across Zlatica River near Crna Bara.

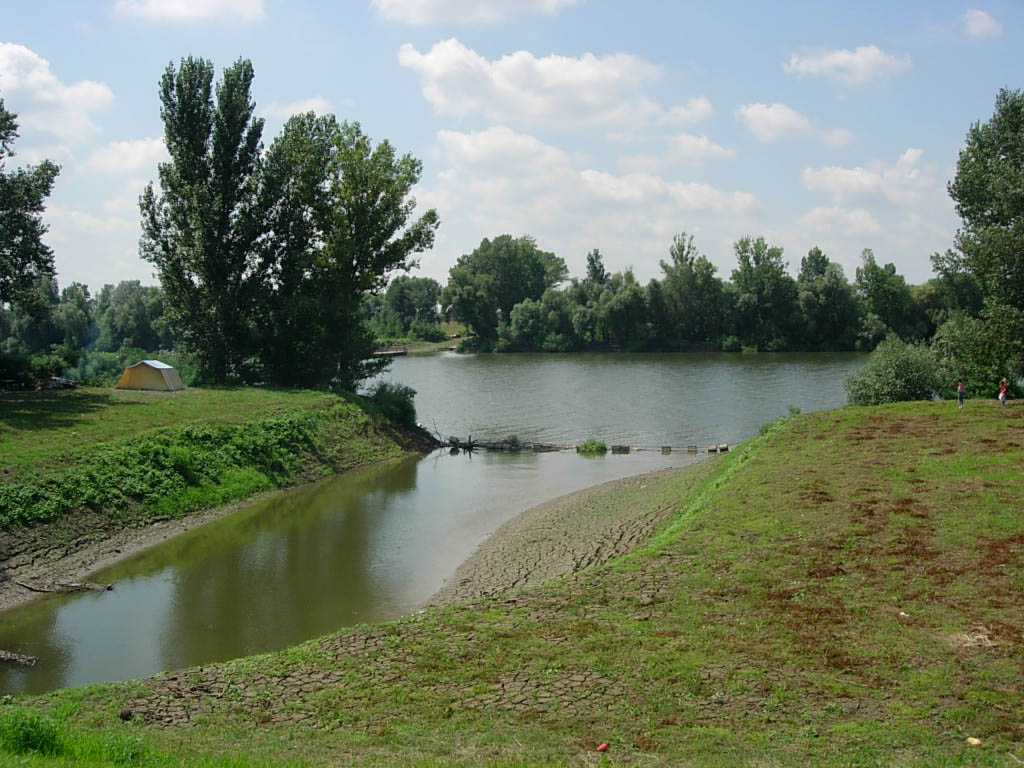
This is the place near Padej where Zlatica River meets Tisa River.

The Aranca or Zlatica (Romanian: Aranca, Serbian: Златица / Zlatica, Hungarian: Aranka) is a 117 km long river in the Banat region of Romania and Serbia, left tributary of the river Tisa.

== Hydronymy ==
The Serbian and Hungarian names of the river carry the meaning the golden river.

== Course ==
The Aranca originates in the northern part of the Banat, near the village Sânpetru German, southwest of the city of Arad, Romania. It flows to the west, next to the large villages of Sânpetru Mare, Saravale, the town of Sânnicolau Mare, Dudeștii Vechi and Vălcani, where it leaves Romania after the course of 76 km and enters Serbia as the Zlatica for the remaining 41 km.

In Serbia, the river turns southwest, receives from the right the Kikinda canal which connects it to the Canal Danube-Tisa-Danube to the south, flows next to the village of Padej and empties into the Tisa river at the town of Ada. Near the village of Banatski Monoštor the Zlatica receives from the right its main tributary, another Romanian-Serbian river, the Begej (not to be confused with larger Begej that flows into the Tisa).

== Characteristics ==
The Aranca belongs to the Danube drainage basin, itself draining 1,470 km^{2} (790 km^{2} in Romania, 680 km^{2} in Serbia). In the lower part it has been channelized, so its navigable for the last 10 km and also very important for the irrigation of the arable land in its valley. Near the village of Jazovo, waters of the Zlatica are used for the Ostojićevo fish pond, and a natural Celeruša bog is also located there.

== Settlements located near the river ==
=== Romania ===
- Secusigiu
- Periam
- Sânpetru Mare
- Saravale
- Sânnicolau Mare
- Dudeștii Vechi
- Vălcani

=== Serbia ===
- Crna Bara
- Banatski Monoštor
- Jazovo
- Padej
