= State Road 103 (Serbia) =

IIA-class road in northern Serbia

State Road 103
- Serbian: Državni put II reda 103; Serbian Cyrillic: Државни пут II реда 103
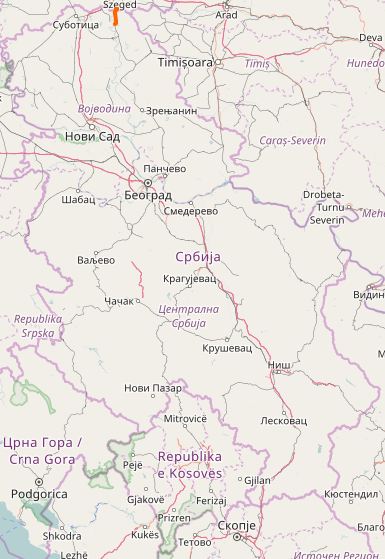

Route information
- Maintained by JP "Putevi Srbije"
- Length: 15.295 km (9.504 mi)

Major junctions
- From: Hungary – Serbia border at Đala, Road 43104
- To: Novi Kneževac

Location
- Country: Serbia
- Districts: North Banat

Highway system
- Roads in Serbia; Motorways
| ← 102 | → 104 |

State Road 103, is an IIA-class road in northern Serbia, connecting Hungary at Đala with Novi Kneževac. It is located in Vojvodina.

Before the new road categorization regulation given in 2013, the route wore the following names: P 112 and P 111 (before 2012) / 100 (after 2012).

The existing route is a regional road with two traffic lanes. By the valid Space Plan of Republic of Serbia the road is not planned for upgrading to main road, and is expected to be conditioned in its current state.

== Sections ==
| Section number | Length | Distance | Section name |
|---|---|---|---|
| 10301 | 13.549 km (8.419 mi) | 13.549 km (8.419 mi) | Hungary – Serbia border (Đala) – Novi Kneževac (Banatsko Aranđelovo) |
| 10302 | 1.746 km (1.085 mi) | 15.295 km (9.504 mi) | Novi Kneževac (Banatsko Aranđelovo) – Novi Kneževac (Đala) |

== See also ==
- Roads in Serbia
