= Szilárd Bogdánffy =

Blessed Szilárd Bogdánffy
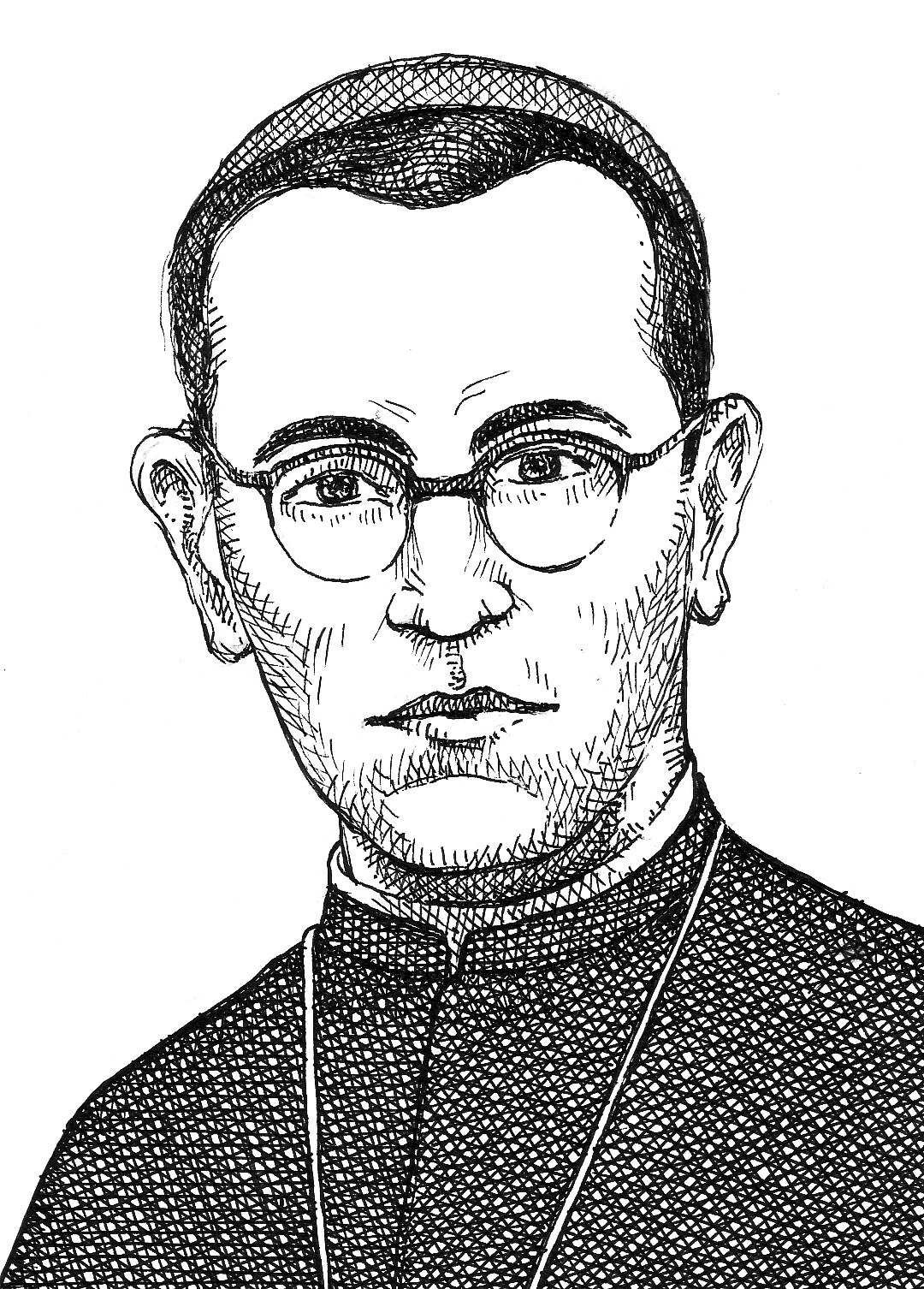

Martyr
- Born: 21 February 1911; Feketetó, Austria-Hungary
- Died: 3 October 1953 (aged 42); Aiud Prison, Romanian People's Republic
- Venerated in: Roman Catholic Church
- Beatified: 30 October 2010, Oradea, Romania by cardinal Angelo Amato
- Feast: 3 October
- Attributes: solideo or bishop's cap and gown, palm
- Patronage: Bishops, Priests

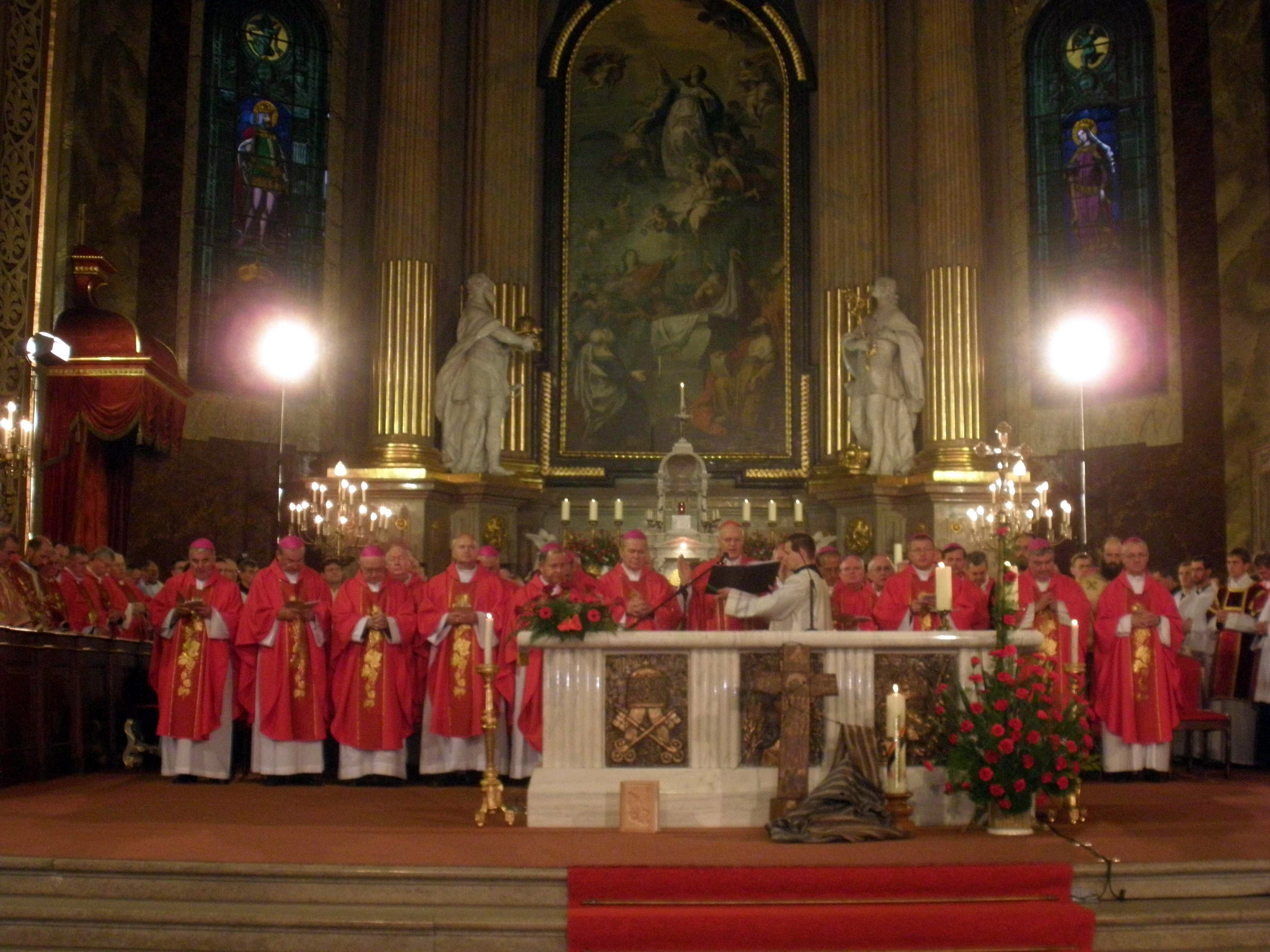
The beatification of Szilárd Bogdánffy, on 30 October 2010, Cathedral Basilica of St. Mary, Oradea

Szilárd Ignác Bogdánffy (21 February 1911 – 3 October 1953) was a Roman Catholic auxiliary bishop of Satu Mare and Oradea of the Latins. On 30 October 2010 he was proclaimed blessed in a ceremony held in the Cathedral Basilica of St. Mary, Oradea, Romania, being recognized as a martyr of the Communist period.

== Biography ==
Szilárd Bogdánffy was born to ethnic Hungarian parents on 21 February 1911 in the village of Feketetó, then part of Torontál County, Austria-Hungary; today called Crna Bara, near the town of Kikinda, district Northern Banat, autonomous province of Vojvodina, Serbia. He lived there with his family until 1925. He was baptized in the parish church of Čoka to which his village belonged and where his father was a cantor.

The Bogdánffy family is a Transylvanian Armenian family which was granted nobility by the Habsburgs. The Bogdánffys are a branch of the ancient Armenian Gajzágó family, one of the families that built the Transylvanian town of Szamosujvár (Armenopolis, Gherla now in Romania) in the 18th century, and which gave many Armenian Catholic (in union with Rome) priests to the town which became the Armenian Catholic bishopric of Transylvania.

=== Study and priesthood ===
Bogdánffy went to elementary school in Crna Bara until 1925, when the Bogdánffy family moved to Timișoara,^{[A]} a city in Romania, in the eastern part of Banat. There he went to the Piarists high school. After his final exams, he was accepted to the Catholic seminary of the Latin Diocese of Oradea. He was ordained a priest by the bishop of Oradea, István Fiedler, on 29 June 1934.^{[B]} He continued his studies at the University of Budapest, where he earned a PhD in philosophy and dogmatics, with a thesis on "Apocalyptics in the Synoptic Gospels". Upon his return to Romania he became professor of the Catholic seminary in Oradea and confessor at the Ursuline convent in the city. In 1939 he was followed by the Royal Romanian Secret Services for alleged anti-Romanian activity. During World War II – because he was hiding Jews – he was also interrogated by the Hungarian Fascist "Nyílas" gendarmes.

=== Bishop in secret ===
After the end of the war, the new Romanian communist leadership started a campaign against the Christian religion (especially against Catholics). As a consequence, the Vatican allowed secret consecration of bishops. Dr. Szilárd Bogdánffy was consecrated as bishop of Oradea of the Latins and auxiliary bishop of Satu Mare on 14 February 1949 by Gerald Patrick O'Hara, Regent of the Apostolic Nunciature to Bucharest. The new bishop was arrested and imprisoned only two months later. He had previously been approached, on several occasions, by representatives of the regime, with the request that he lead an "independent Romanian Latin-rite Church, with no ties to the Vatican" which he adamantly refused. Until his death he spent four years as a captive in various prisons throughout Romania, including the evil-reputed Cape Midia camp at the Danube–Black Sea Canal. He fell seriously ill, being affected by bad conditions and regular torture. At Aiud Prison, as the Byzantine rite Catholic bishop of Lugoj, Ioan Ploscaru recalled, Bishop Bogdánffy was "humble and serene, always ready to help his fellow sufferers". Although lying sick with serious pneumonia, the prison doctor refused him the necessary medication claiming he was not worthy of it. He died in solitary confinement on 3 October 1953 at Aiud Prison.

== Beatification ==
His beatification took place on 30 October 2010 in Oradea. Saint mass with 200 priests, 42 bishops and two cardinals guided and during it preached Cardinal Péter Erdő, Archbishop of Esztergom-Budapest, President of the Council of European Bishops' Conferences (CCEE). The same ceremony of beatification was presided by the Cardinal and Archbishop Angelo Amato, President of the Congregation for causes of the Saints. He is the first Catholic martyred during the Communist regime in Romania to be elevated to the honor of the altars.

== Notes ==
^{A} Timișoara (German: Temeschburg, also Temeswar or Temeschwar, Hungarian: Temesvár, Serbian: Темишвар, Temišvar, Turkish: Tamışvar) is a city in the Banat region of western Romania. It is the capital of Timiș County.
^{B} Stefan or István Fiedler was born in the Banat too, in Nagybecskerek, today Zrenjanin, Serbia.

== Bibliography ==
- Ioan Ploscaru, Lanțuri și teroare, Editura Signata, Timișoara, 1993, pp. 185–189.
- László Böcskei püspök: Imafüzet (Isten Szolgája/Boldog) Bogdánffy Szilárd vértanú püspökhöz, Rómaikatolikus Püspökség Nagyvárad 2010, p. 36.
