= Giucoșin =

- Location within Serbia Location within Romania

Location
- Country: Romania, Serbia
- Counties: Timiș County, Vojvodina
- Villages: Tomnatic, Teremia Mare, Mokrin

Physical characteristics
- Source: Banat Plain, Romania
- Mouth: Aranca
  - location: near Jazovo, Serbia
  - coordinates: 45.8799°N 20.2450°E

Basin features
- Progression: Aranca→ Tisza→ Danube→ Black Sea

The Giucoșin (Serbian: Ђукошин, romanized: Đukošin or Ђукошина речица/Đukošina rečica) is a left tributary of the river Aranca in Romania and Serbia. It discharges into the Aranca (Zlatica) near Jazovo. Today, it is for the most part a dry riverbed because the water flows into the Kikinda Canal, part of the Danube-Tisa-Danube water system.
