= State Road 104 (Serbia) =

Road in northern Serbia

State Road 104
- Serbian: Državni put II reda 104; Serbian Cyrillic: Државни пут II реда 104
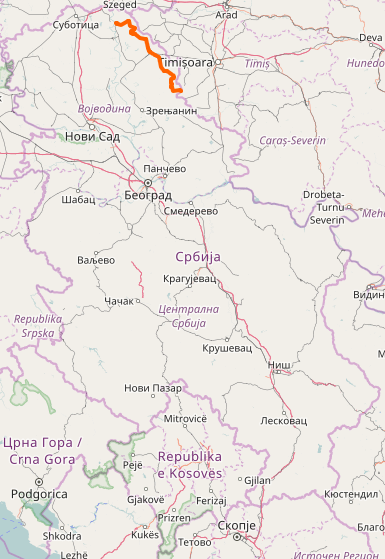

Route information
- Maintained by JP "Putevi Srbije"
- Length: 110.696 km (68.783 mi)

Major junctions
- From: Novi Kneževac
- To: Serbia – Romania border at Međa

Location
- Country: Serbia
- Districts: North Banat, Central Banat

Highway system
- Roads in Serbia; Motorways
← 103	→ 105

State Road 104, is an IIA-class road in northern Serbia, connecting Novi Kneževac with Romania at Međa. It is located in Vojvodina.

Before the new road categorization regulation given in 2013, the route wore the following names: P 111, P 123, P 112, M 3, and O 6 (before 2012) / 100, 123 and 109 (after 2012).

The existing route is a regional road with two traffic lanes. By the valid Space Plan of Republic of Serbia the road is not planned for upgrading to main road, and is expected to be conditioned in its current state.

== Sections ==
Section number	Length	Distance	Section name
10401	12.373 km (7.688 mi)	12.373 km (7.688 mi)	Novi Kneževac (Banatsko Aranđelovo) – Banatsko Aranđelovo
10402	17.100 km (10.625 mi)	29.473 km (18.314 mi)	Banatsko Aranđelovo – Crna Bara
10403	2.216 km (1.377 mi)	31.689 km (19.691 mi)	Crna Bara – Crna Bara (Mokrin) (overlap with)
10404	20.104 km (12.492 mi)	51.793 km (32.183 mi)	Crna Bara (Mokrin) – Kikinda (Mokrin)
01517	2.068 km (1.285 mi)	53.861 km (33.468 mi)	Kikinda (Mokrin) – Kikinda (Vojvoda Stepa) (overlap with)
10405	23.349 km (14.508 mi)	77.210 km (47.976 mi)	Kikinda (Vojvoda Stepa) – Vojvoda Stepa
10406	22.018 km (13.681 mi)	99.228 km (61.657 mi)	Vojvoda Stepa – Srpski Itebej
10407	11.468 km (7.126 mi)	110.696 km (68.783 mi)	Srpski Itebej – Serbia – Romania border at Međa

== See also ==
- Roads in Serbia
