= Sisitak Mound =

Protected area in Romania

- IUCN category IV (habitat/species management area)
- Location within Romania
- Location: Sânpetru Mare, Timiș County, Romania
- Coordinates: 46°0′8″N 20°46′21″E
- Area: 0.5 ha (1.2 acres)
- Established: 1974, 2000

Sisitak Mound (also Romanianized as Șișitac; Hungarian: Sisitak domb; Serbian: Шишитак Унка, romanized: Šišitak Unka) is a nationally protected area, classified as an IUCN Category IV botanical nature reserve, situated in Timiș County within the administrative boundaries of the Sânpetru Mare commune. A tumulus at least 1,000 years old, it has been documented since the 18th century in the Josephinische Landesaufnahme, being assigned the name Sisitak.

== Location ==
The natural area, covering 0.5 hectares, is situated in the northwestern corner of Timiș County, near the border with Arad County. It lies to the south of the village of Sânpetru Mare, close to the national road (DN6) that links the town of Sânnicolau Mare with the village of Lovrin.

== Description ==
The nature reserve was designated as a protected area under Law No. 5 of 6 March 2000. It consists of a round tumulus, overlooking the Banat Plain, which serves as a habitat for various steppe plant species.

The site is well preserved, featuring a concrete pillar in its upper section that functioned as the base for a topographic marker associated with the state geodetic network; the installation of this feature resulted in an elevation of the mound's upper portion. The mound measures approximately 83 m in diameter and 9.3 m in height.

The presence of rare grass species has been reported in the reserve area, including crested wheatgrass (Agropyron cristatum) and hairy feathergrass (Stipa capillata).
