= State Road 102 (Serbia) =

Road in northern Serbia

State Road 102
- Serbian: Državni put II reda 102; Serbian Cyrillic: Државни пут II реда 102
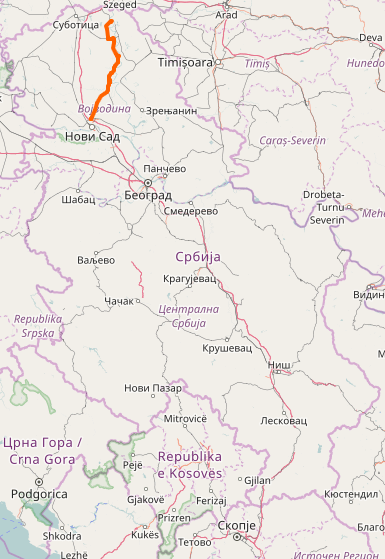

Route information
- Maintained by JP "Putevi Srbije"
- Length: 108.984 km (67.720 mi)

Major junctions
- From: Kanjiža
- To: Novi Sad

Location
- Country: Serbia
- Districts: North Banat, South Bačka

Highway system
- Roads in Serbia; Motorways
← 101	→ 103

State Road 102, is an IIA-class road in northern Serbia, connecting Kanjiža with Novi Sad. It is located in Vojvodina.

Before the new road categorization regulation given in 2013, the route wore the following names: P 119, M 24, P 122, M 3 and P 120 (before 2012) / 101 and 19 (after 2012).

The existing route is a regional road with two traffic lanes. By the valid Space Plan of Republic of Serbia the road is not planned for upgrading to main road, and is expected to be conditioned in its current state.

== Sections ==
Section number	Length	Distance	Section name
10201	7.968 km (4.951 mi)	7.968 km (4.951 mi)	Kanjiža – Zimonić
10202	9.863 km (6.129 mi)	17.831 km (11.080 mi)	Zimonić – Gornji Breg (Kanjiža)
10203	1.351 km (0.839 mi)	19.182 km (11.919 mi)	Gornji Breg (Kanjiža) – Gornji Breg (Novo Orahovo)
10204	3.635 km (2.259 mi)	22.817 km (14.178 mi)	Gornji Breg (Novo Orahovo) – Senta (Subotica road) (overlap with)
10205	40.544 km (25.193 mi)	63.361 km (39.371 mi)	Senta (Subotica road) – Bečej (Bačka Topola)
10206	3.256 km (2.023 mi)	66.617 km (41.394 mi)	Bečej (Bačka Topola) – Bečej (Ada)
01512	3.587 km (2.229 mi)	70.204 km (43.623 mi)	Bečej (Ada) – Bečej (Bačko Gradište) (overlap with)
10207	8.728 km (5.423 mi)	78.932 km (49.046 mi)	Bečej (Bačko Gradište) – Bačko Gradište
10208	6.955 km (4.322 mi)	85.887 km (53.368 mi)	Bačko Gradište – Nadalj
10209	10.273 km (6.383 mi)	96.160 km (59.751 mi)	Nadalj – Temerin
10210	12.824 km (7.968 mi)	108.984 km (67.720 mi)	Temerin – Novi Sad (Temerin)

== See also ==
- Roads in Serbia
