= Sanad (Čoka) =

Village in Vojvodina, Serbia

Sanad Санад (Serbian) Szanád (Hungarian)
- Village (Selo)
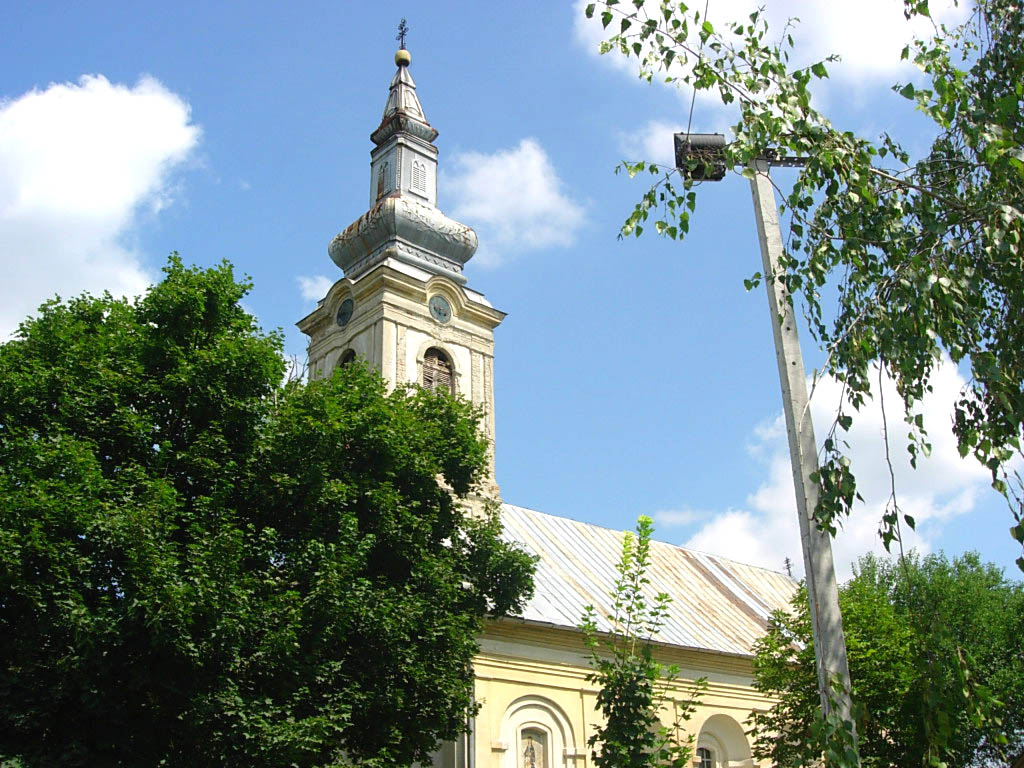
- The Orthodox Church

- Location within Vojvodina Location within Serbia Location within Europe
- Coordinates: 45°59′N 20°06′E
- Country: Serbia
- Province: Vojvodina
- Region: Banat
- District: North Banat
- Municipality: Čoka

Population (2002)
  - Total: 1,314
- Time zone: UTC+1 (CET)
  - Summer (DST): UTC+2 (CEST)

Sanad (Serbian Cyrillic: Санад, Hungarian: Szanád) is a village located in the Čoka municipality, in the North Banat District of Serbia. It is situated in the Autonomous Province of Vojvodina. The village has a Serb ethnic majority and its population numbering 1,314 people (2002 census). Sanad is mostly agricultural village and it is located at the left bank of the river Tisza.

== Name ==
In Serbian the village is known as Sanad (Санад), in Hungarian as Szanád, in German as Sanad, in Romanian as Sanad, and in Croatian as Sanad.

== Historical population ==
- 1961: 1,892
- 1971: 1,770
- 1981: 1,584
- 1991: 1,384
- 2002: 1,314

== See also ==
- List of places in Serbia
- List of cities, towns and villages in Vojvodina

== Gallery ==
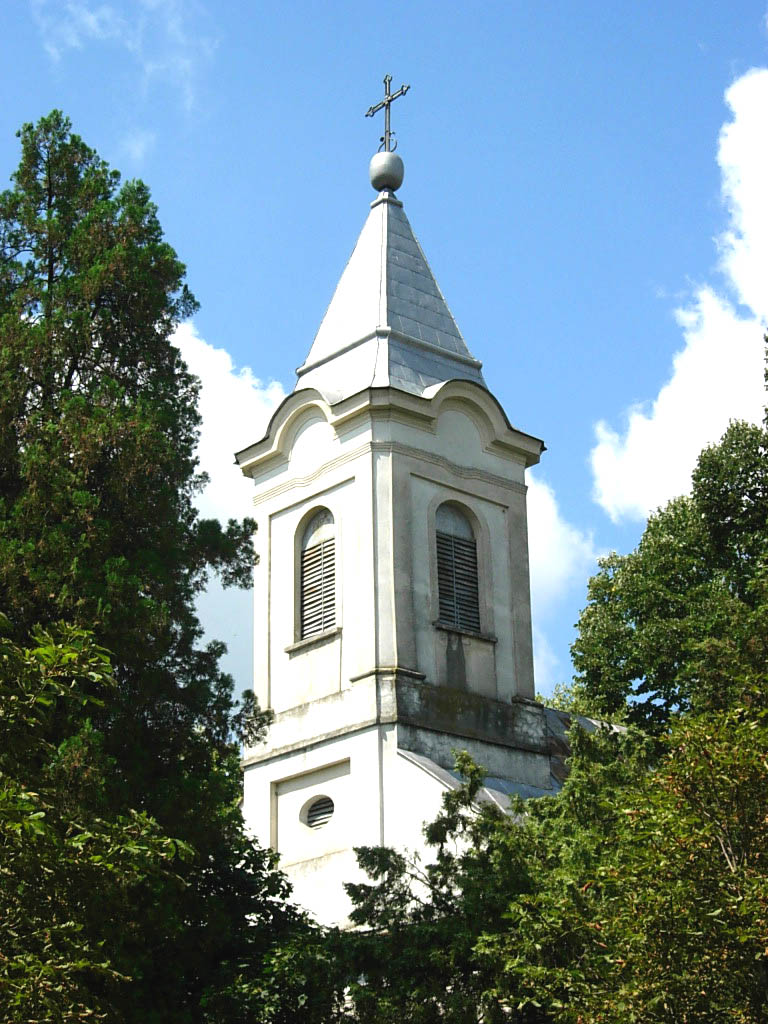
The Birth of Blessed Virgin Mary Catholic Church.
