= Ostojićevo =

Village in Vojvodina, Serbia

Ostojićevo Остојићево (Serbian) Tiszaszentmiklós (Hungarian)
- Village (Selo)
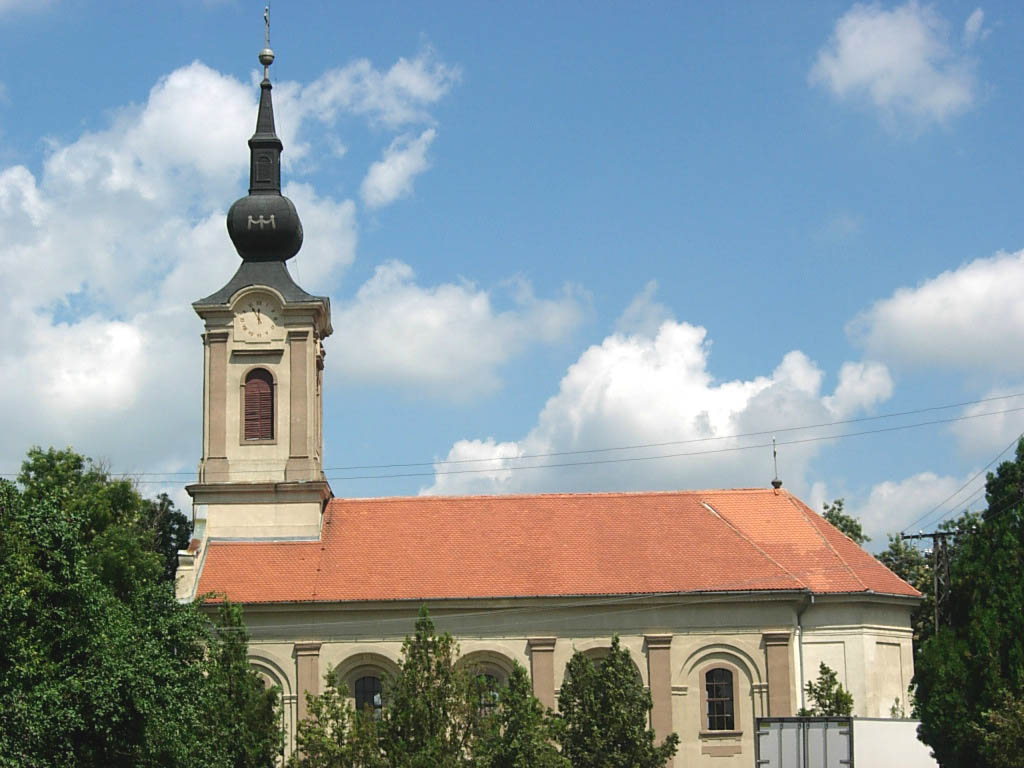
- The Orthodox Church

- Location within Vojvodina Location within Serbia Location within Europe
- Coordinates: 45°53′17″N 20°10′00″E
- Country: Serbia
- Province: Vojvodina
- Region: Banat
- District: North Banat
- Municipality: Čoka
- Elevation: 88 m (289 ft)

Population (2011)
  - Ostojićevo: 2,844
- Time zone: UTC+1 (CET)
  - Summer (DST): UTC+2 (CEST)
- Postal code: 23326
- Area code: +381(0)230
- Car plates: KI

Ostojićevo (Serbian Cyrillic: Остојићево, Hungarian: Tiszaszentmiklós) is a village in Serbia. It is situated in the Čoka municipality, North Banat District, Vojvodina province. The village has a Serb ethnic majority (56.15%) with a present Hungarian minority (26.51%) and its population numbering 2,844 people. The village also has a Polish minority of about 300 people, of Silesian Goral (mostly from Wisła) descent (2002 census).

== Name ==
In Serbian the village is known as Ostojićevo (Остојићево), in Hungarian as Tiszaszentmiklós, in Slovak as Ostojičovo, in Croatian as Ostojićevo, and in German as Sankt Nikolaus an der Theiß.

== Historical population ==
- 1961: 4,024
- 1971: 3,678
- 1981: 3,395
- 1991: 3,040

== See also ==
- List of places in Serbia
- List of cities, towns and villages in Vojvodina

== Gallery ==
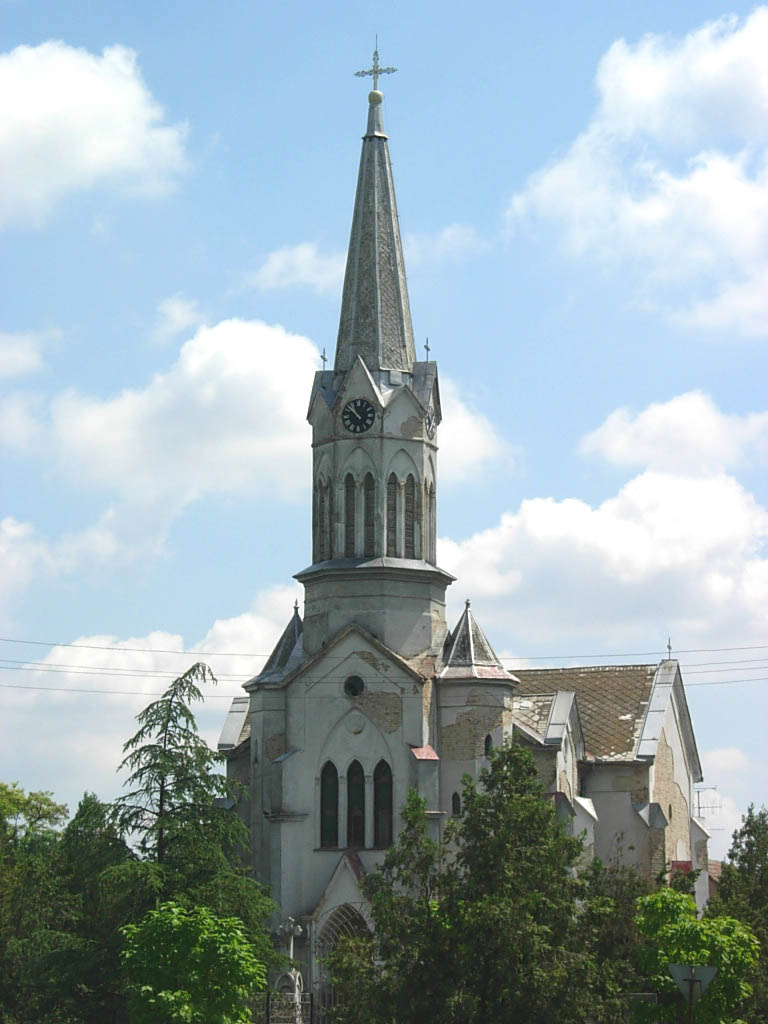
The Saint Joseph Catholic Church.

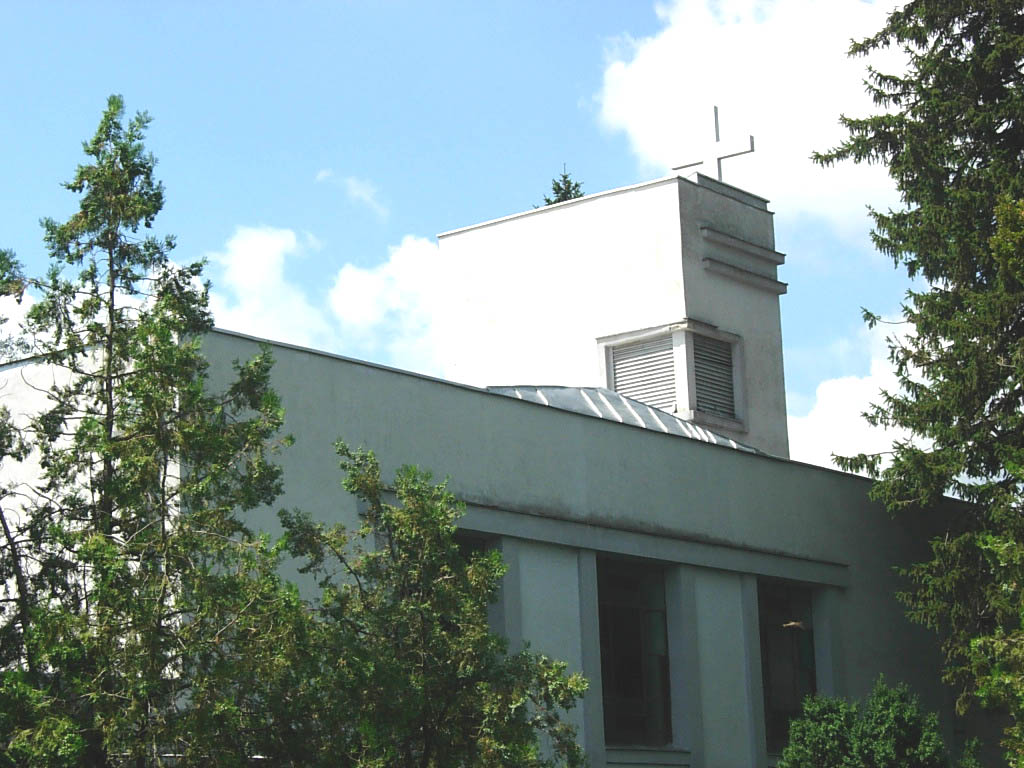
The Evangelical church.
