= Saravale =

- Commune
- Location in Timiș County

- Location in Romania
- Coordinates: 46°04′13″N 20°44′14″E
- Country: Romania
- County: Timiș
- Established: 1333 (first attested)

Government
  - Mayor (2012–): Sava Stoian (PSD)
- Area: 102.47 km^{2} (39.56 sq mi)
- Population (2021-12-01): 2,610
  - Density: 25/km^{2} (66/sq mi)
- Time zone: EET/EEST (UTC+2/+3)
- Postal code: 307387
- Vehicle reg.: TM
- Website: www.saravale.ro

Saravale (colloquially Sarafola; Hungarian: Sárafalva; German: Sarafeld or Sarafol; Serbian: Саравола, romanized: Saravola) is a commune in Timiș County, Romania. It is composed of a single village, Saravale. It was part of Sânpetru Mare commune until 2004, when it was split off.

== Etymology ==
The Hungarian name of the village can be translated as "mud village": sár ("mud") + falva ("village"). Historically, the Romanians called the village Sarafola, a name that is still used today by some inhabitants. The name Saravale has been used since 11 September 1926, when the communal council unanimously decided that the village should have this name. According to local tradition, the foundations of this settlement were laid by the Roman colonists who, arriving in these parts of Dacia, at dusk one day, towards evening, stopped in this valley watered by Aranca River and, delighted by the beauty of the place, gave it the name of Saravale (a corruption of the Romanian expression seara-n vale ("evening in the valley").

== Geography ==
=== Relief ===
Aranca Plain is located in the westernmost part of Romania, between the Mureș River and the Jimbolia Plain, being the newest and lowest Mureș plain. The territory lies within the Mureș Plain which is a typical form of fluvio-lacustrine subsidence, with shallow valleys with abandoned riverbeds resulting from the regularization of watercourses and drainage, having an altitude between 80–85 m (262–279 ft). The northern part is located in the former meadow of Mureș, and the southern part in the former meadow of the old Aranca stream.

=== Climate ===
Due to its position, Saravale is in the conditions of the temperate continental climate of transition with the predominance of maritime and continental air masses of eastern origin, to which are added the warm air masses that cross the Mediterranean and some polar air masses. The western circulation persists both in the cold period and in the warm period of the year and is characterized by mild winters with liquid precipitation. The polar circulation is determined by cyclones in the North Atlantic and is characterized by decreases in temperature, increased cloudiness and precipitation in the form of showers, and in winter the snow is accompanied by wind gusts. The tropical circulation determines mild winters and significant amounts of precipitation, and in summer unstable weather with showers and lightning.

=== Flora ===
Human activities have produced major changes in the physiognomy of the vegetation by expanding agricultural land and reducing natural vegetation. In the Aranca meadow there is a lacustrine vegetation formed by bulrush, club-rush, sedge, reed, etc. Meadow pastures are valuable, comprising many fodder species, such as meadow foxtail, meadow grass, ryegrass, white clover, alsike clover and others. The tree vegetation, mostly planted by man, consists, among others, of black locust, mulberry and Sophora japonica, which before 1970–1975 was cultivated along the streets and in people's backyards. Other common species include horse chestnut, poplar, willow and, quite rarely, Norway maple, ash and oak. As fruit trees, plums, apples, pears, apricots, cherries and sour cherries are spread in the gardens of the locals.

== History ==
The first recorded mention of Saravale dates from 1333, being mentioned in the papal tithe records as Zarafolua. It had two priests, which indicates that it was a large and important locality. In the Middle Ages, the hearth of the village was closer to Mureș and only later was it moved to its current location.

In 1508 the locality became the property of the Patócsi family. At that time it was inhabited by Romanians, but only until 1529, when a Turkish incursion of Bali Bey resulted in the total destruction of the village, the inhabitants having to take refuge. Later, Ferenc Patócsi repopulated the settlement with Serbian serfs, who settled here permanently. They changed its name to Saravola, as evidenced by a Turkish document showing the collection of tithes from Ottoman villages. In 1647, during the Turkish occupation of Banat, it was inhabited by Serbs. In 1718, following the conquest of Banat by the Austrians, Saravale was annexed to the Banat of Temeswar. Between 1723–1725, it seems that the Serbs left the settlement. It is not known when the Romanians settled, but Hungarian historians claim that they came around 1725. Later, German settlers arrived from Tomnatic and Gottlob.

== Demographics ==
Ethnic composition (2021)
1. Romanians (48.8%)
2. Roma (37.9%)
3. Serbs (3.29%)
4. Unknown (9.50%)
5. Others (0.51%)
Religious composition (2021)
1. Orthodox (77.8%)
2. Pentecostals (6.32%)
3. Serbian Orthodox (3.40%)
4. Plymouth Brethren (1.76%)
5. Unknown (9.65%)
6. Others (1.10%)

Saravale had a population of 2,610 inhabitants at the 2021 census, down 0.68% from the 2011 census. In terms of ethnicity, there is no majority group, the inhabitants being Romanians (48.81%), Roma (37.89%) and Serbs (3.29%). For 9.5% of the population, ethnicity is unknown. By religion, most inhabitants are Orthodox (77.77%), but there are also minorities of Pentecostals (6.32%), Serbian Orthodox (3.4%) and Plymouth Brethren (1.76%). For 9.65% of the population, religious affiliation is unknown.

Census		Ethnic composition
Year	Population	Romanians	Hungarians	Germans	Roma	Serbs
1880	3,606	1,891	108	447	–	1,140
1890	4,188	2,170	201	560	–	1,237
1900	4,279	2,190	183	611	39	1,254
1910	3,944	2,093	109	496	–	1,233
1920	3,904	2,104	70	432	–	–
1930	3,714	2,087	86	377	154	990
1941	3,537	2,187	120	327	–	–
1956	3,098	–	–	–	–	–
1966	3,039	2,172	48	122		691
1977	2,804	2,035	32	66	120	550
1992	2,457	1,582	27	21	501	318
2002	2,540	1,943	17	18	305	246
2011	2,628	1,694	18	8	543	194
2021	2,610	1,274	8	–	989	86

== Politics and administration ==
The commune of Saravale is administered by a mayor and a local council composed of 11 councilors. The mayor, Sava Stoian, from the Social Democratic Party, has been in office since 2012. As from the 2024 local elections, the local council has the following composition by political parties:

Party	Seats	Composition
Social Democratic Party	5	
Force of the Right	3	
Alliance for the Union of Romanians	1	
Social Liberal Humanist Party	1	
Save Romania Union	1	

== Notable people ==
- Vladimir Ciocov (1920–1986), poet
- Neboișa Popovici (1929–1997), prose writer and literary critic
