= Đala =

Đala Ђала (Serbian)
- Village (Selo)
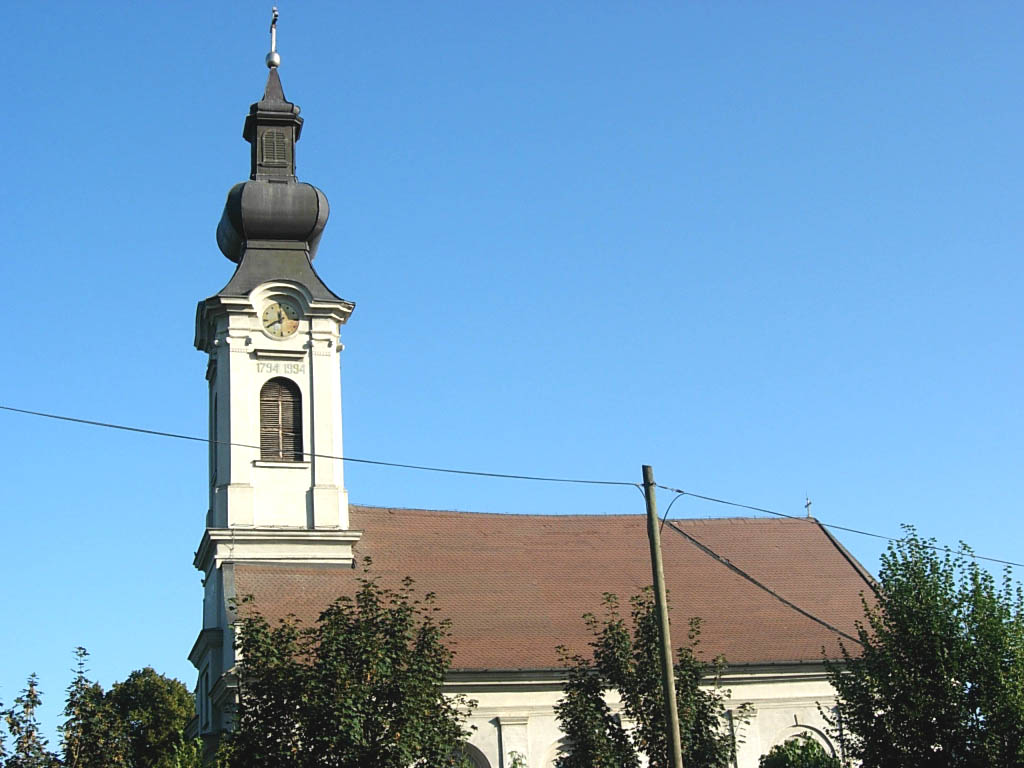
- The Orthodox Church

- Location of Vojvoda Zimonić within Serbia Đala (Serbia) Đala (Europe)
- Coordinates: 46°09′00″N 20°06′00″E
- Country: Serbia
- Province: Vojvodina
- District: North Banat
- Municipalities: Novi Kneževac
- Elevation: 76 m (249 ft)

Population (2002)
  - Đala: 1,004
- Time zone: UTC+1 (CET)
  - Summer (DST): UTC+2 (CEST)
- Postal code: 23335
- Area code: +381(0)230
- Car plates: KI

Đala (Serbian Cyrillic: Ђала, Hungarian: Gyála) is a village in Serbia. It is situated in the Novi Kneževac municipality, in the North Banat District, Vojvodina province. The village has a Serb ethnic majority (80.07%) with a present Hungarian (9.86%) and Roma minority (5.57%). It has a population of 1,004 people (2002 census). At the northern exit of the village is a daytime border (7 AM - 7 PM) crossing with Hungary, Đala-Tiszasziget, which can be used only by citizens of Serbia, Hungary and other EU citizens, as well as citizens of Switzerland.

== History ==
Bronze Age graves of south Russian steppe nomads were found in the village.

== Population ==
- 1961: 1,723
- 1971: 1,578
- 1981: 1,325
- 1991: 1,072

== Twin town ==
- Zugló, Hungary (2026)

== See also ==
- List of places in Serbia
- List of cities, towns and villages in Vojvodina
