= Banatski Monoštor =

Banatski Monoštor Банатски Моноштор (Serbian) Kanizsamonostor (Hungarian)
- Village (Selo)
- Location of Banatski Monoštor within Serbia Banatski Monoštor (Serbia) Banatski Monoštor (Europe)
- Coordinates: 45°57′24″N 20°16′33″E
- Country: Serbia
- Province: Vojvodina
- Region: Banat
- District: North Banat
- Municipality: Čoka
- Elevation: 82 m (269 ft)

Population (2022)
  - Banatski Monoštor: 62
- Time zone: UTC+1 (CET)
  - Summer (DST): UTC+2 (CEST)
- Area code: +381(0)230
- Car plates: KI

Banatski Monoštor (Serbian Cyrillic: Банатски Моноштор; Hungarian: Kanizsamonostor) is a village in Serbia. It is situated in the Čoka municipality, in the North Banat District, Vojvodina province. The village has a Hungarian ethnic majority (94.81%) and its population numbering 62 people (2022 census).

== See also ==
- List of places in Serbia
- List of cities, towns and villages in Vojvodina
