= Padej =

Padej Падеј (Serbian) Padé (Hungarian)
- Village (Selo)
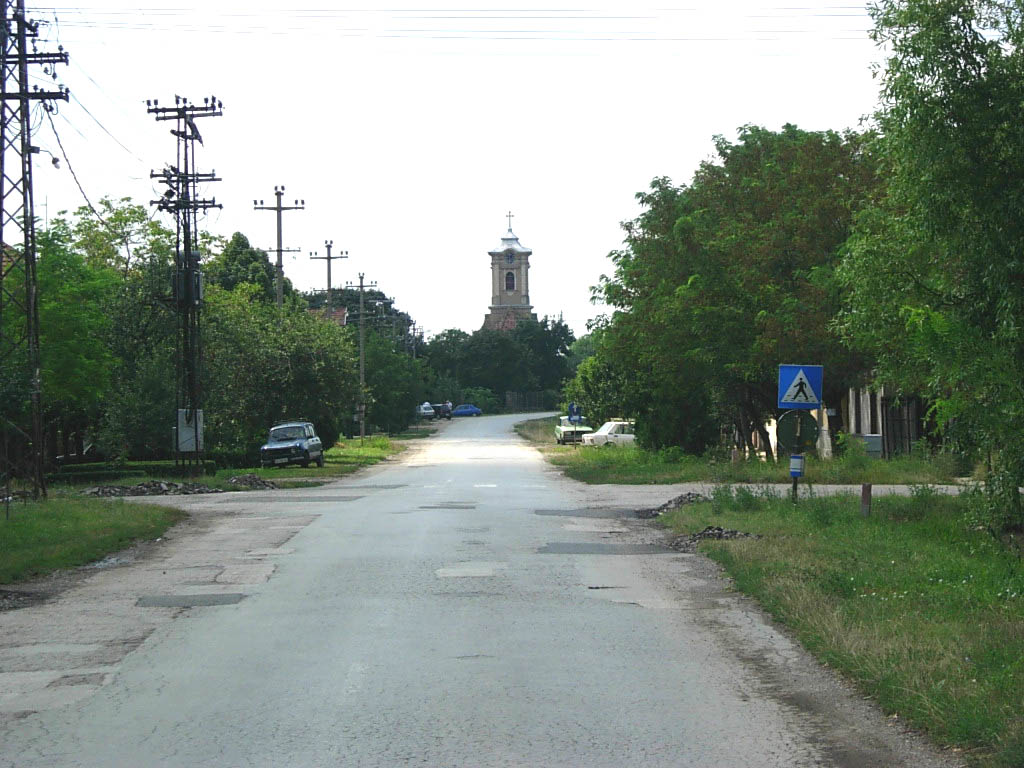
- The main street and the Dedication of Saint Mary Major Catholic Church.

- Location of Padej within Serbia Padej (Serbia) Padej (Europe)
- Coordinates: 45°49′26″N 20°09′35″E
- Country: Serbia
- Province: Vojvodina
- Region: Banat
- District: North Banat
- Municipality: Čoka

Area
  - Padej: 78.3 km^{2} (30.2 sq mi)
- Elevation: 82 m (269 ft)

Population (2011)
  - Padej: 2,376
  - Density: 30.3/km^{2} (78.6/sq mi)
- Time zone: UTC+1 (CET)
  - Summer (DST): UTC+2 (CEST)
- Postal code: 23325
- Area code: +381(0)230
- Car plates: KI

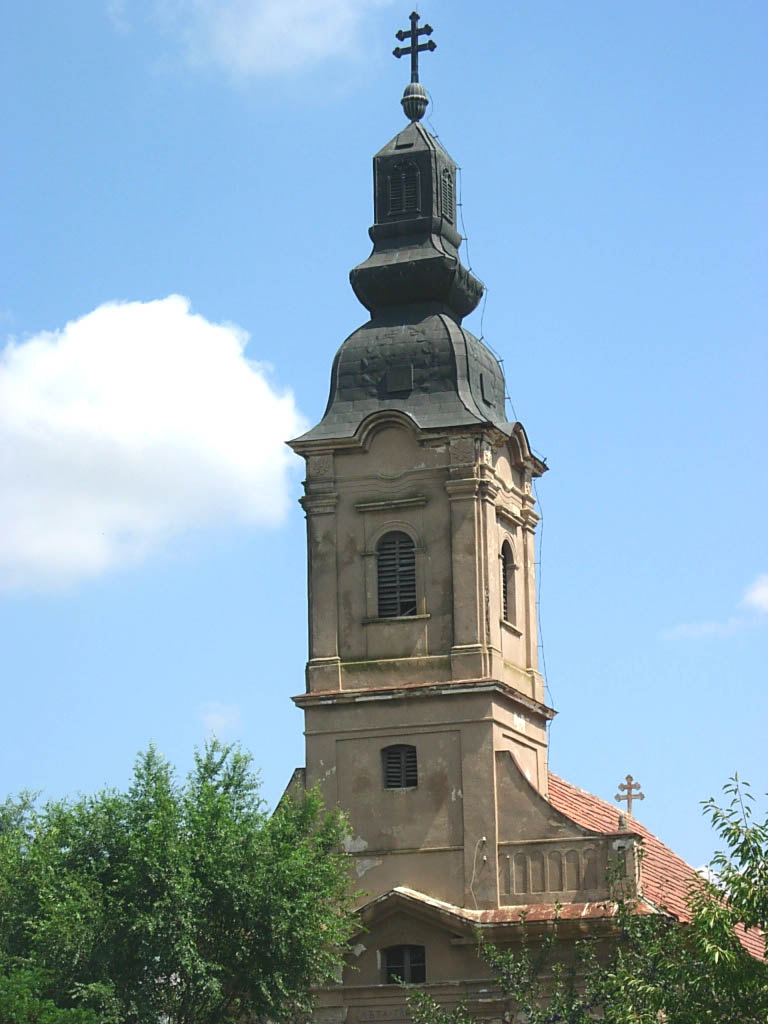
The Orthodox church.

Padej (Serbian Cyrillic: Падеј; Hungarian: Padé) is a village located in Čoka municipality, North Banat District, Vojvodina province, Serbia. As of 2011 census, it has a population of 2,376 inhabitants.
