= Mokrin =

Mokrin Мокрин (Serbian)
- Village (Selo)
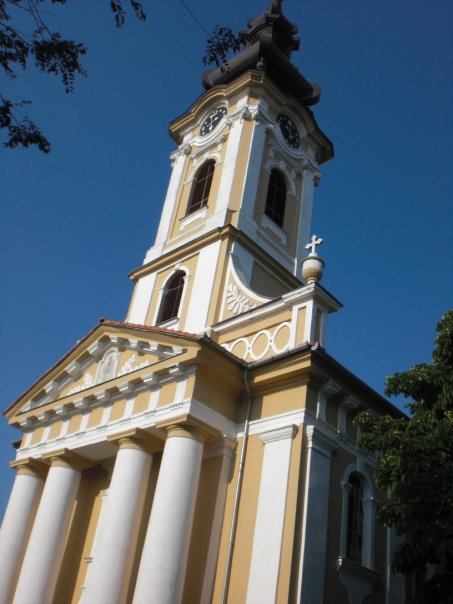
- The Serbian Orthodox Church in Mokrin
- Interactive map of Mokrin
- Location of Mokrin within Serbia Mokrin (Serbia) Mokrin (Europe)
- Coordinates: 45°56′05″N 20°24′16″E
- Country: Serbia
- Province: Vojvodina
- Region: Banat
- District: North Banat
- Municipality: Kikinda
- Elevation: 90 m (300 ft)

Population (2011)
  - Mokrin: 5,270
- Time zone: UTC+1 (CET)
  - Summer (DST): UTC+2 (CEST)
- Postal code: 23305
- Area code: +381(0)230
- Car plates: KI

Mokrin (Serbian Cyrillic: Мокрин) is the largest village in the Kikinda municipality, in the North Banat District of Serbia. It is situated in the Autonomous Province of Vojvodina. The village has a Serb ethnic majority (83.47%) with a present Romani (6.23%) and Hungarian minority (4.9%). It has a population of 5,270(2011 census)

== Name ==
In Serbian, the village is known as Mokrin (Мокрин), in Hungarian as Mokrin (previously Homokrév), and in German as Mokrin. The name of the village derived from Serbian word "mokro" ("wet" in English).

== History ==
A Bronze Age Moriš culture necropolis of 312 graves was unearthed in Mokrin. The graves of the men had large golden discs placed at the breasts. Only a small amount of the graves were found to have weapons and tools.

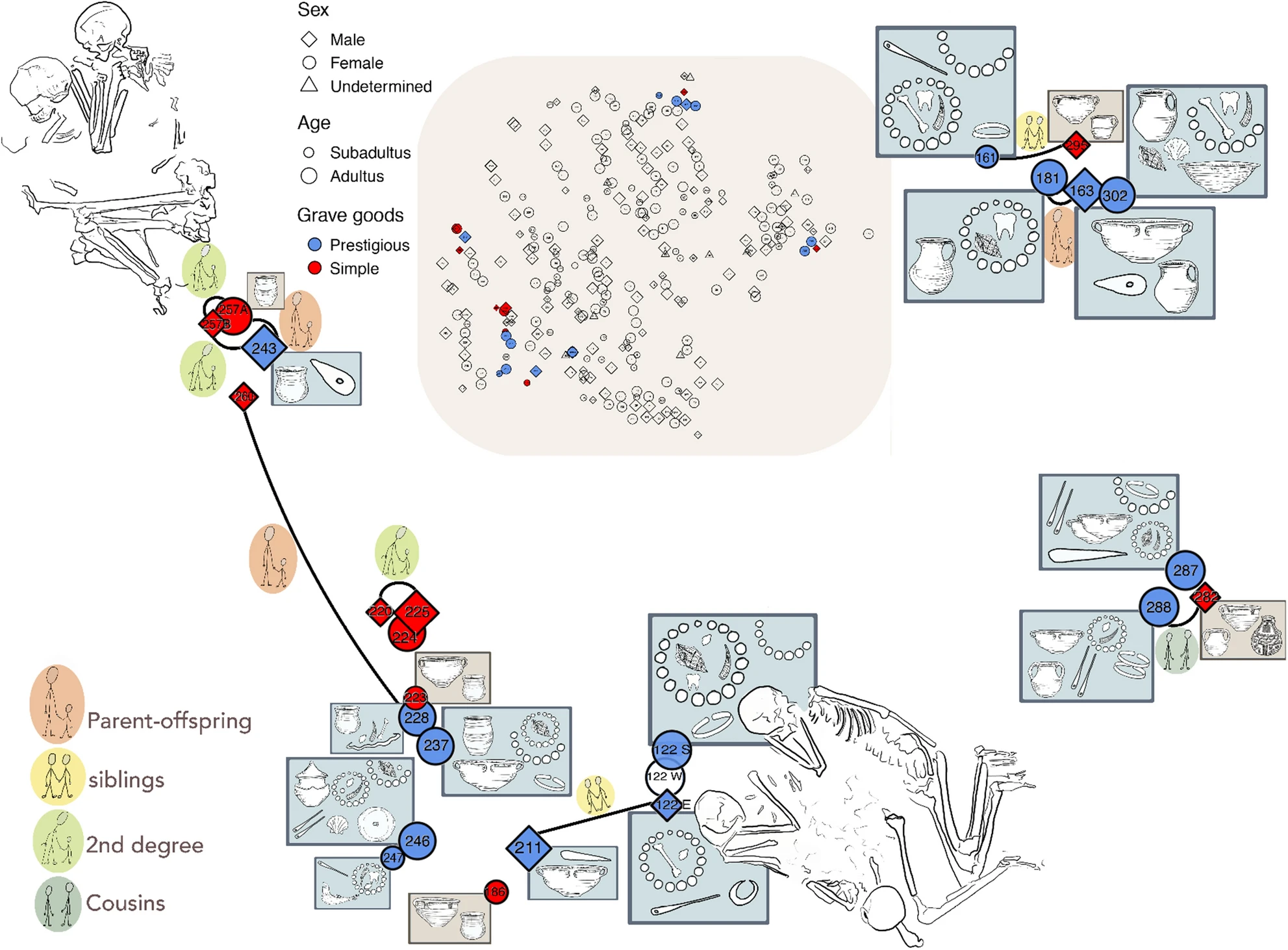
Bronze Age necropolis of the Maros culture at Mokrin

The village was first named Homokrév and it was located on the banks of the river Harangoda, today referred to as Aranka or Zlatica. During the 13th and 14th centuries, it was under the possession of Hungarian landowners. According to an Ottoman census of tax payers from 1557 and 1558, there were 30 Serbian households in the village.

Its current name dates from 1723. In 1778, the village had a population of 1,609. At the beginning of the 20th century, Mokrin underwent a period of economic prosperity, mostly due to its strategic location on the Szeged-Timișoara railway, which was very important at the time. There were 1,780 households in Mokrin at that time and 9,279 citizens of which 6,233 were ethnic Serbs, 1,063 ethnic Germans, and 838 ethnic Hungarians.

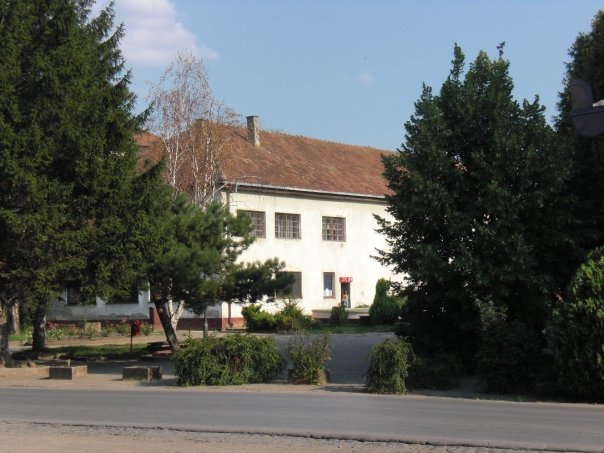
Park in Mokrin

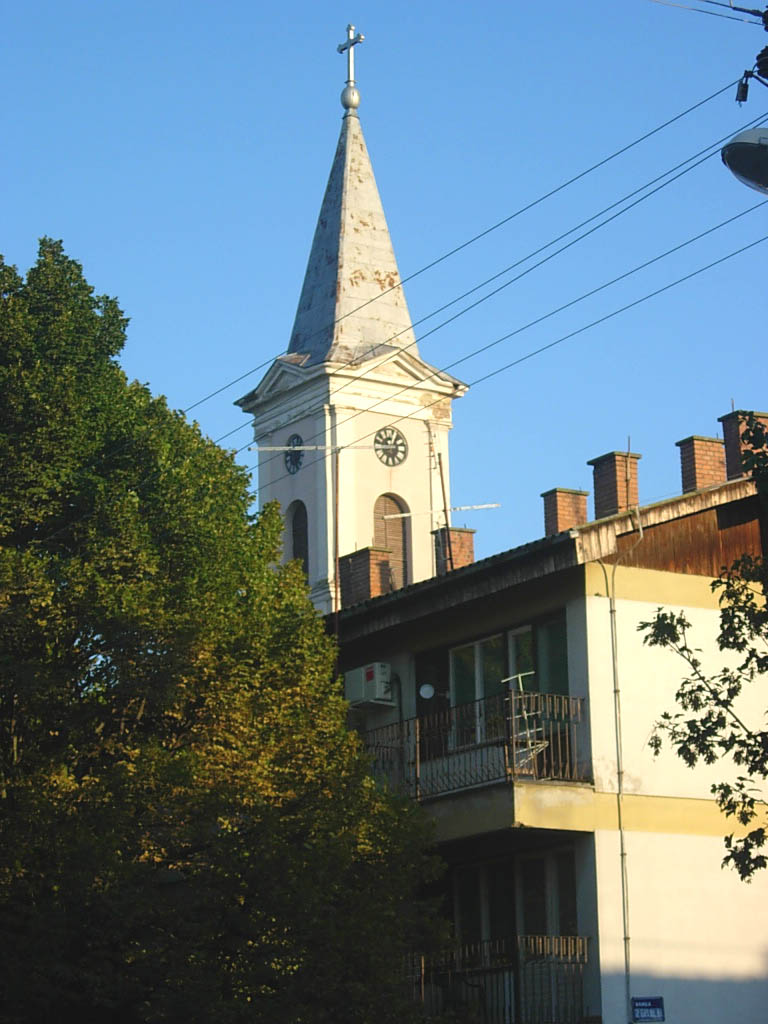
The Ascension of the Holy Cross Catholic Church in Mokrin

== Features ==
The village is famous throughout the region for its annual competition in striking Easter eggs on Easter Sunday, according to the Julian Calendar. The competition is called Tucanijada in Serbian. One person holds an Easter egg in his or her hand, while another person hits it with his own Easter egg. The egg which remains whole wins, while the cracked egg must be given to the winner.

This village is also famous for the pastime of goose fighting.

== Famous people ==
- Milan Čeleketić, former major general
- Mika Antić, poet
- Đorđe Ivanović, football player
- Peđa Krstin, tennis player, coach
- Teodora Kostović, tennis player
- Raša Popov, writer, poet, journalist and TV personality
- Vasa Stajić, philosopher and writer
- Imre Szabó, photojournalist
