= Sânpetru Mare =

- Commune
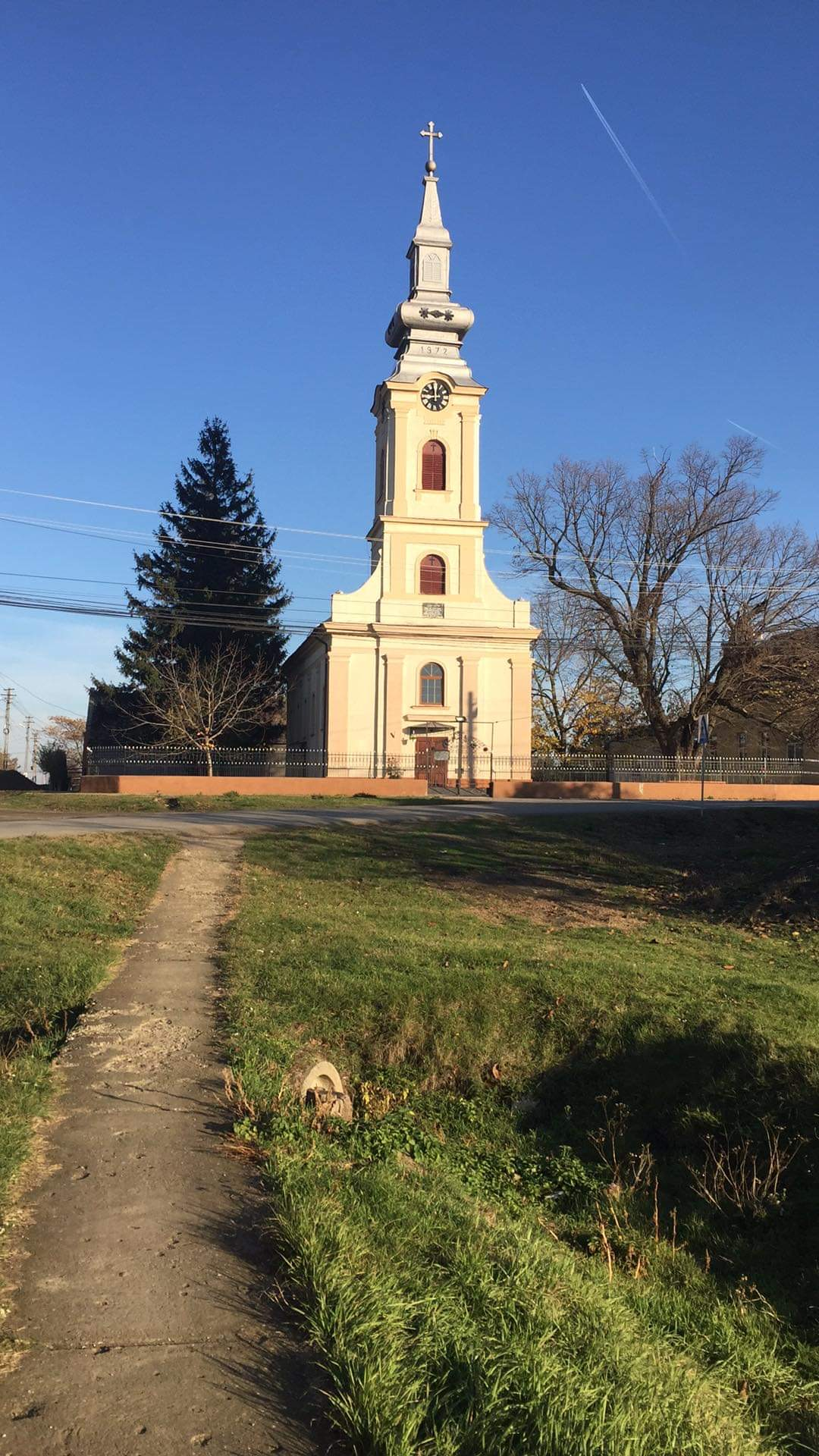
- The Serbian Orthodox church in Sânpetru Mare

- Location in Timiș County

- Location in Romania
- Coordinates: 46°3′N 20°49′E
- Country: Romania
- County: Timiș

Government
  - Mayor (2024–): Bogdan-Marius Petrean (PSD)
- Area: 101.59 km^{2} (39.22 sq mi)
- Population (2021-12-01): 2,680
  - Density: 26.4/km^{2} (68.3/sq mi)
- Time zone: UTC+02:00 (EET)
  - Summer (DST): UTC+03:00 (EEST)
- Postal code: 307385–307386
- Vehicle reg.: TM
- Website: www.primariasanpetrumare.ro

Sânpetru Mare ("Great St. Peter"; Hungarian: Nagyszentpéter; German: Groß St. Peter; Serbian: Велики Семпетар, romanized: Veliki Sempetar) is a commune in Timiș County, Romania. It is composed of two villages, Igriș and Sânpetru Mare (commune seat). It also included the village of Saravale until it was split off to form a separate commune in 2004. The village of Sânpetru Mic ("Little St. Peter") is in the neighboring commune of Variaș.

== Geography ==
Sânpetru Mare is located in the Mureș–Aranca Plain, this representing the northwestern extremity of the low plain within the Banat Plain, with a low relief energy, having absolute altitudes between 82 and 95 m (269 and 312 ft), increasing from northwest to southwest. The territory of the commune is crossed by the Aranca River from east to west, which separates the low plain of subsidence and divagation in two relief levels. The high level is located to the south (left bank) and represents an alluvial plain remodeled and shaped by the wind, and the low level to the north of Aranca is a typical alluvial plain.

The territory of the commune is located in the Danubian steppe area, at the interference of the ante-steppe sub-zone with the forest-steppe sub-zone, which makes it benefit from a temperate continental climate, with weak Mediterranean influences, manifested by mild winters and not-too-hot summers, the average annual temperature being 10.8 °C (51.4 °F), and the average annual rainfall being 536.3 mm (21.11 in).

== History ==
=== Sânpetru Mare ===
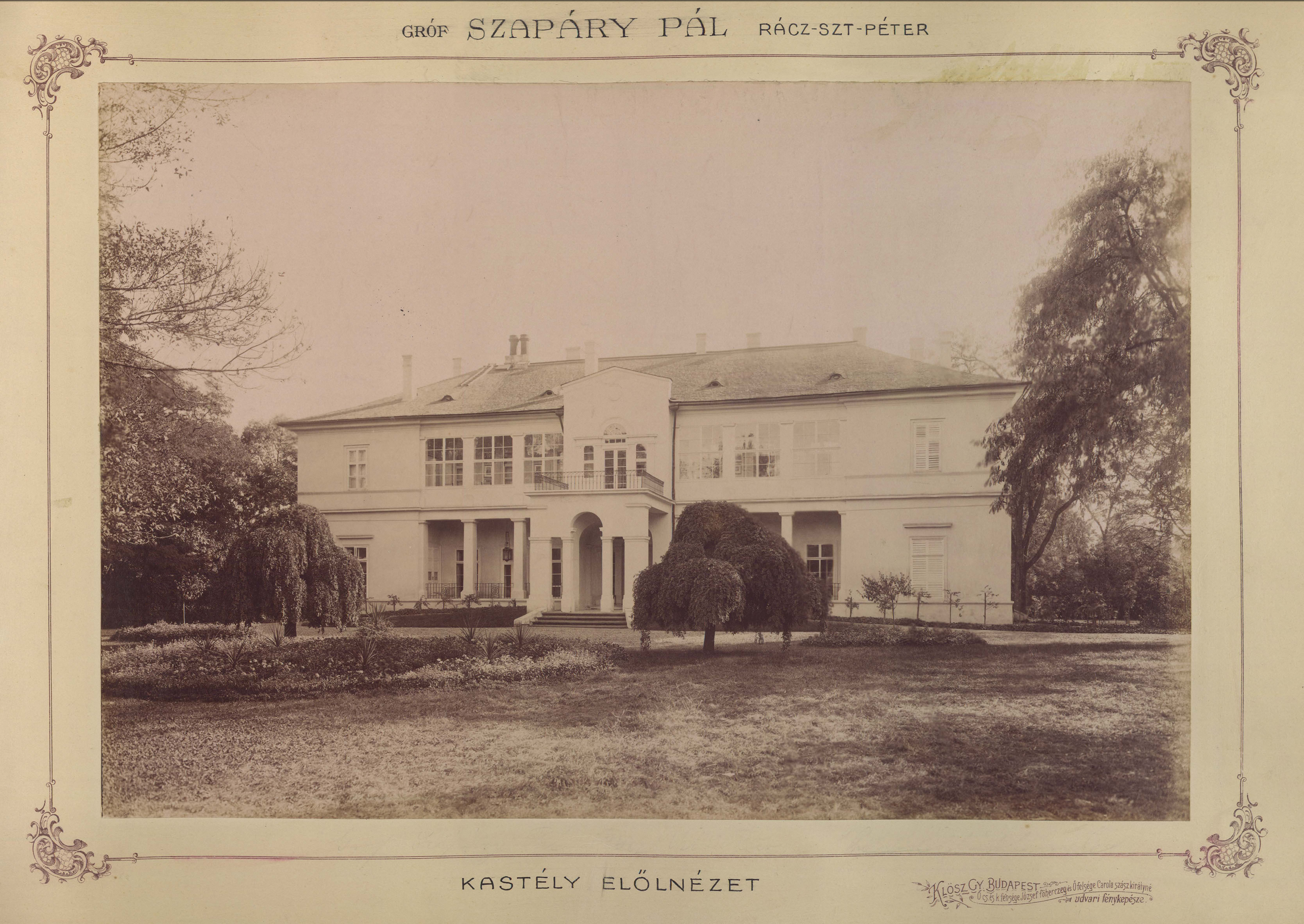
Front view of Count Pál Szapáry's castle in the 1890s

Sânpetru Mare was first mentioned in the papal tithe records of 1333 as Sancto Petro. The first name of the locality can be explained by the fact that in 1333 the Romanians from Sânpetru Mare had an Orthodox parish and a church dedicated to Saint Peter. In the Middle Ages it was a Romanian village, and from 1404 the Serbs began to settle here, so that in 1558 the village bears the Slavic name Veliki Sveti Petar/Велики Свети Петар, as proof of the Serbianization of the locality. It was inhabited by Serbs during the Turkish period, and when the Serbs became the majority, they changed its name to Racsenpetar/Рацсенпетар or Sânpetru Sârbesc ("Serbian St. Peter"), as mentioned in Marsigli's writings of 1690–1700. In 1748, Romanian colonists brought from Transylvania settled here, but over time they Serbianized. Until the end of the 18th century, German colonists also settled here, some from the neighboring locality of Periam, until they became the second largest community.

In 1796, on a plot broken down from the border of Sânpetru Mare, the settlement of Sânpetru Nou was established, inhabited only by Germans. Already in 1808 this new village had 479 inhabitants. Sânpetru Nou belonged to the commune of Sânpetru Mare until 1868, after which it became independent. In the 1960s it was incorporated into Sânpetru Mare.

=== Igriș ===
==== High Middle Ages. The monastery. Turkish invasion ====
In 1179 the monastery of the Cistercian monks was erected here, destroyed during the Mongol invasion of 1241. The Igriș Monastery was founded by Agnes of Antioch, the first wife of King Béla III of Hungary. Founded as a filial abbey of the Pontigny Abbey, it was originally inhabited by monks from France, who became owners of Igriș. The Pontigny Abbey is located in the homonymous commune in Burgundy, being the most famous Cistercian monastery, one of the four primary abbeys established by the Cîteaux Abbey, a monastery destroyed during the French Revolution. The name of the locality comes from the word egresch, which in Hungarian has two meanings: "currant" and "place of fairies". Here was the nucleus of the first actual library in Romania, with a local copy workshop. In 1202 the monks from Igriș established their own filial abbey, the Cârța Monastery, near Sibiu.

During the regency of King Andrew II (1205–1235), the monastery was renovated and transformed, surrounded by a fortress wall and strong fortifications that can be seen today. When his wife, Yolanda of Courtenay, daughter of the Latin Emperor of Constantinople, Peter II of Courtenay, died in 1232, Andrew II buried her in the church crypt. After six years, he also died, being also buried here.

In the summer of 1242 the Mongols occupied the fortified monastery, killed the local nobles who had taken refuge here, but left the monks alive. After Ögedei Khan's death, which led to the withdrawal of the Mongols, the monks returned and rebuilt the monastery under King Ladislaus II. Over time it was reinforced with stronger bastions. It had become so powerful that Ladislaus IV sent the royal treasure and crown to Igriș for preservation. In 1280 it was attacked by Oldamir's Cumans, so Ladislaus IV personally mobilized the army to defend it.

The inhabitants of Igriș fought against the Turks under the command of Pál Kinizsi, according to his epistle of 2 July 1494, when they defeated the Turkish armies led by the Wallachian voivode Basarab II on Câmpul Pâinii. In 1500, Ladislaus II gave the fortress to Bishop Miklós Csáky of Cenad, with the consent of Parliament and the Pope, which is why the monks left the monastery forever. In 1514 the inhabitants of the fortress actively participated in the revolt led by György Dózsa, the battle of Igriș being won by the peasants, but participation in the revolt led to the depopulation of the fortress due to persecution after the defeat of the revolt under the walls of Timișoara Fortress by John Zápolya.

In 1526 the fortress was conquered by the Turks, after Sultan Suleiman I won the battle of Mohács, and ruled by the Turkish army until 1541 when it was conquered by the prefect of Timișoara, Petru Petrovici, and left in the care of a guard recruited from Serbian Romanians. During the turmoil, it is ruled by Tamás Varkocs, who also rules Cenad. In 1551 the fortress was conquered by Mehmed Bey, who destroyed the entire existing fortification, the inhabitants leaving for the most part these lands.

==== Modern history ====
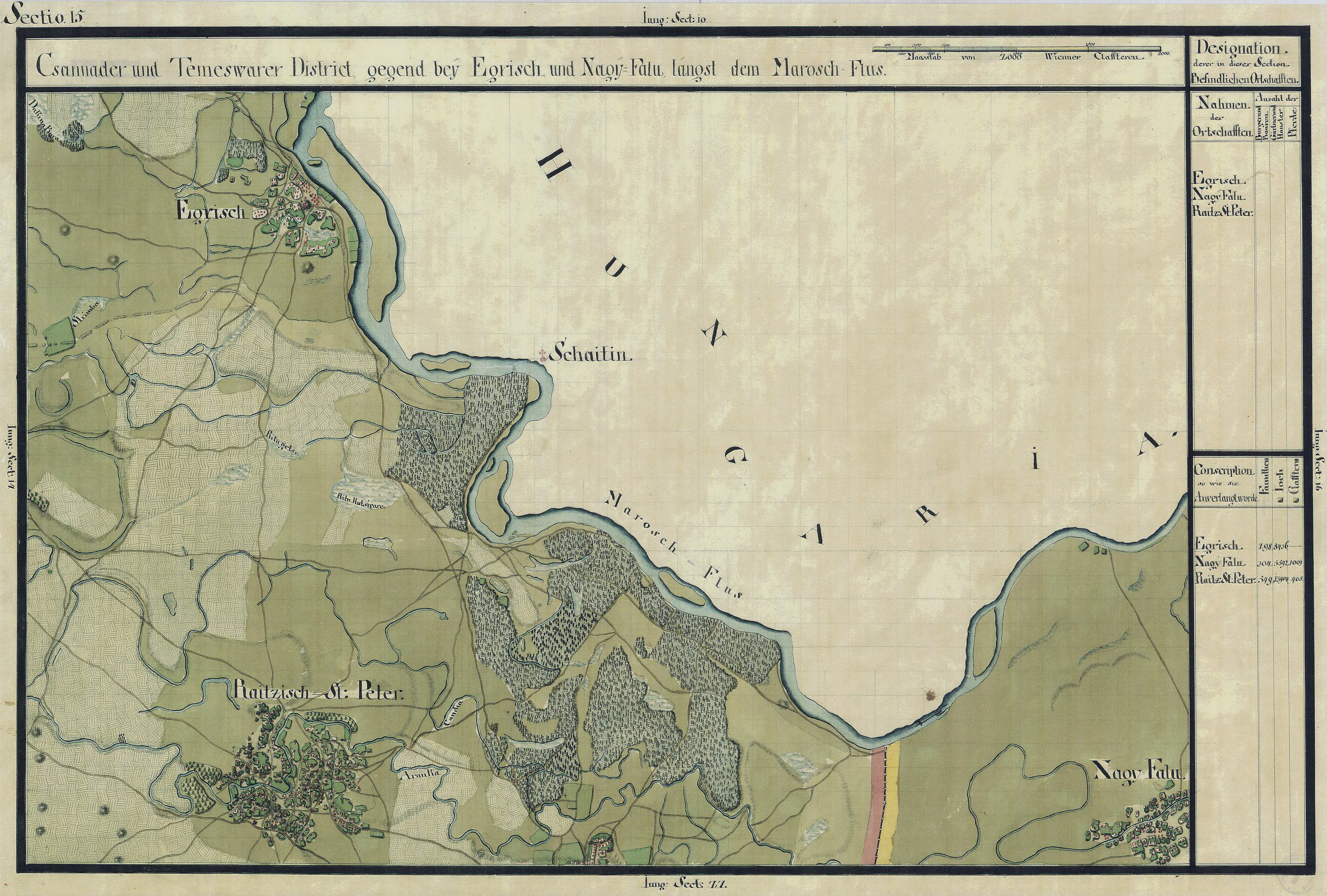
Sânpetru Mare (Raitzisch St. Peter) and Igriș (Egrisch) on the Josephinische Landesaufnahme of 1769–1772

After the almost complete destruction of the locality, the fortress and the monastery, a period of decline followed. Gradually, the Turkish persecution weakened and the inhabitants of Igriș were able to settle again, some returning to their homes, others coming from other places, such as the Serbs who settled here during this period. It is known that in 1647 it is mentioned in a report as inhabited. It will pass into the possession of several owners, but will be owned mainly by the diocese of Cenad, because, after the Austrians conquer Banat, the bishop of Cenad claims it. However, the state incorporates it into the Banat of Temeswar.

It is not known exactly when the Serbs left Igriș, but since the 18th century, Igriș has been inhabited by Romanians. After 1715, several Romanian families moved here from the border territory of Mureș and from the Apuseni Mountains. Then another wave of Romanians came in 1750–1790. The population is growing and the inhabitants are building an Orthodox church from adobe, which already existed in 1758, and in 1819 they are building the brick church that still exists today.

It developed a lot in the 19th century. Although it was located in an area where there were massive colonizations with different populations, especially Germans, Igriș kept its Romanian character, so that in 1838 it had 2,540 Orthodox Romanians and only 24 Roman Catholics. Around 1845 some inhabitants converted to Greek Catholicism and thus a community was formed which in 1912 completed the construction of its own church. Roman Catholics also built a church in 1910.

After the union of Banat with Romania, Igriș became part of Timiș-Torontal County, Plasa Periam. The first mayor of Igriș, after the union, was Ignea Galu. During the interwar period, the locality experienced a strong economic and cultural development. Many peasants were owned, a choir was established, the cultural center was built (1937), etc. After World War II, the locality was Sovietized and communized. In 1951, 280 inhabitants of Igriș (79 families) were deported to Bărăgan. The vast majority were taken to Tătaru Nou and returned only in 1956. The plan of forced collectivization followed, which most of the people of Igriș vehemently opposed, but the collectivization ended in 1958, some of the locals being forced to move to cities. In 1968, Igriș lost its status as a commune, being included, like Saravale, in the commune of Sânpetru Mare. In general, the communist period meant the massive depopulation of the locality, which halved in 50 years. Due to this, in 2004, when steps were taken for the village to regain its commune status, this goal could not be achieved because it did not meet the population criterion, i.e. at least 1,500 inhabitants.

== Demographics ==
Ethnic composition (2021)
1. Romanians (62.2%)
2. Serbs (15.1%)
3. Roma (2.94%)
4. Unknown (19.3%)
5. Others (0.50%)
Religious composition (2011)
1. Orthodox (63.6%)
2. Serbian Orthodox (14.8%)
3. Unknown (19.6%)
4. Others (1.91%)
5. Irreligious, atheists and agnostics (0.11%)

Sânpetru Mare had a population of 2,680 inhabitants at the 2021 census, down 14.78% from the 2011 census. Most inhabitants are Romanians (62.16%), larger minorities being represented by Serbs (15.11%) and Roma (2.94%). For 19.29% of the population, ethnicity is unknown. By religion, most inhabitants are Orthodox (63.58%), with a minority of Serbian Orthodox (14.85%). For 19.55% of the population, religious affiliation is unknown.

Census		Ethnic composition
Year	Population	Romanians	Hungarians	Germans	Roma	Serbs
1880	6,829	2,954	148	1,551	–	1,997
1890	7,432	3,049	207	1,789	339	2,119
1900	7,328	3,358	217	1,659	–	1,992
1910	7,055	3,267	126	1,422	–	2,042
1920	6,779	3,076	76	1,385	–	–
1930	5,953	2,566	98	1,223	292	1,743
1941	5,659	2,867	49	1,058	–	–
1956	5,220 (Note: Including data on Sânpetru Nou's population, which was incorporated into Sânpetru Mare in the 1960s)	–	–	–	–	–
1966	4,733	2,823	18	546	2	1,332
1977	4,016	2,245	12	376	266	1,096
1992	3,267	2,003	27	36	444	743
2002	3,304	2,295	36	23	404	523
2011	3,145	2,118	26	16	424	400
2021	2,680	1,666	11	–	79	405

== Politics and administration ==
The commune of Sânpetru Mare is administered by a mayor and a local council composed of 13 councilors. The mayor, Bogdan-Marius Petrean, from the Social Democratic Party, has been in office since 2024. As from the 2024 local elections, the local council has the following composition by political parties:

Party	Seats	Composition
Social Democratic Party–National Liberal Party	6	
Alliance for the Union of Romanians	5	
Union of Serbs of Romania	2	
