= Jazovo =

Village in Vojvodina, Serbia

Jazovo Јазово (Serbian) Hódegyháza (Hungarian)
- Village (Selo)
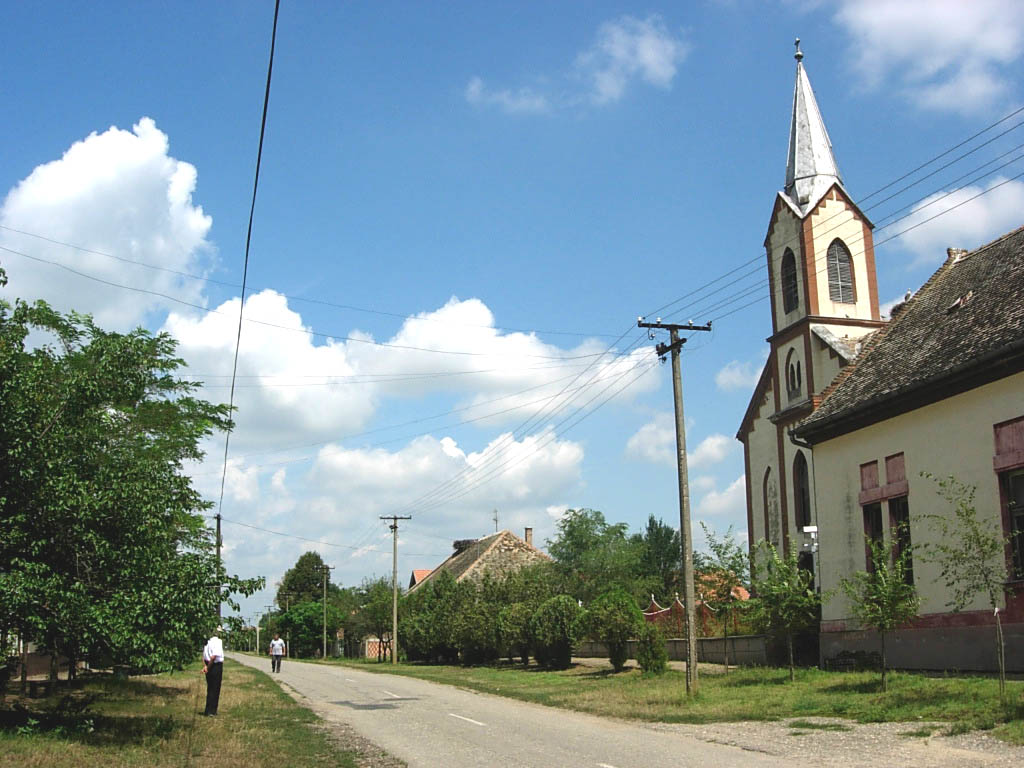
- The main street in the village and the Saint Michael Archangel Catholic Church

- Location of Jazovo within Serbia Jazovo (Serbia) Jazovo (Europe)
- Coordinates: 45°54′05″N 20°12′35″E
- Country: Serbia
- Province: Vojvodina
- Region: Banat
- District: North Banat
- Municipality: Čoka
- Elevation: 87 m (285 ft)

Population (2002)
  - Jazovo: 978
- Time zone: UTC+1 (CET)
  - Summer (DST): UTC+2 (CEST)
- Postal code: 23327
- Area code: +381(0)230
- Car plates: KI

Jazovo (Serbian Cyrillic: Јазово, Hungarian: Hódegyháza) is a village in Serbia. It is situated in the Čoka municipality, North Banat District, Vojvodina province. The village has a Hungarian ethnic majority (85.07%) and its population numbering 978 people (2002 census).

== Historical population ==
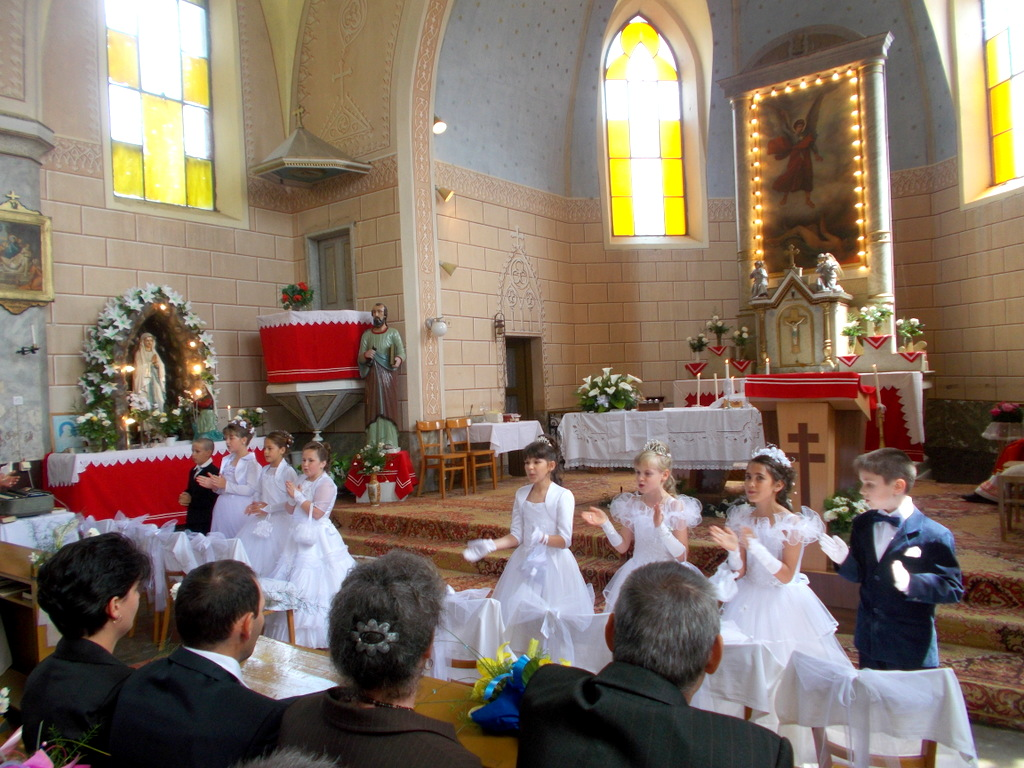
First Communion in the Church of St. Archangel Michael on 24 May 2015

- 1961: 1,729
- 1971: 1,625
- 1981: 1,261
- 1991: 1,118
- 2002: 978

== See also ==
- List of places in Serbia
- List of cities, towns and villages in Vojvodina
