= Čoka =

Town and municipality in Vojvodina, Serbia

Čoka Чока (Serbian) Csóka (Hungarian)
- Town and municipality
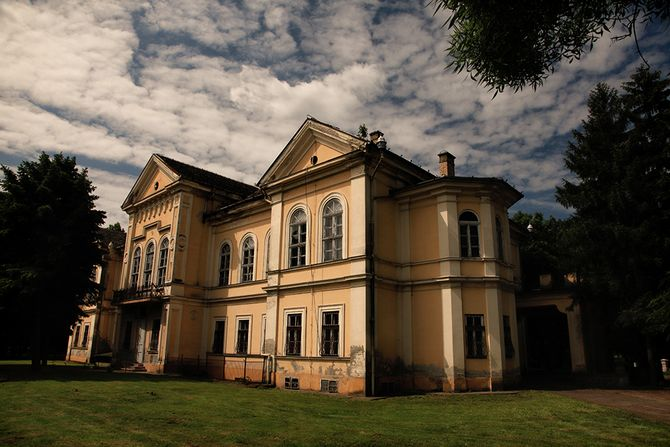
- Lederer's Mansion in Čoka

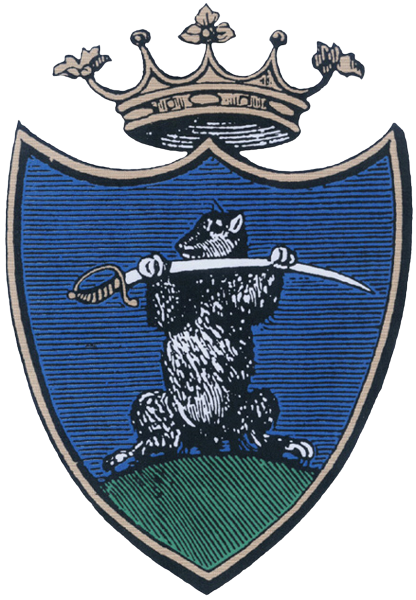
- Coat of arms

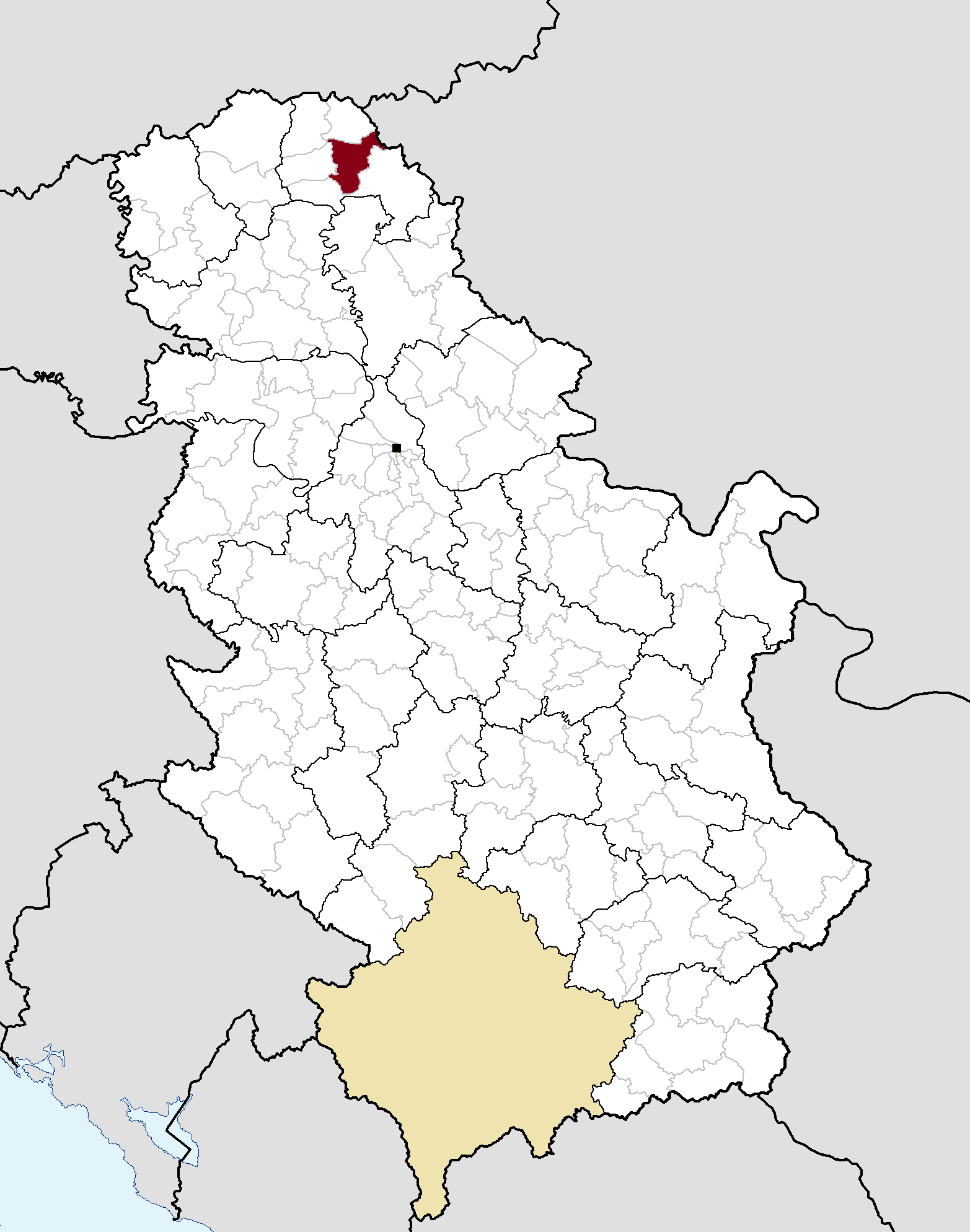
- Location of Čoka within Serbia
- Coordinates: 45°56′N 20°09′E
- Country: Serbia
- Province: Vojvodina
- Region: Banat
- District: North Banat
- Municipality: Čoka

Government
  - Mayor: Stana Đember (SNS)

Area
  - Čoka: 321.0 km^{2} (123.93 sq mi)
- Elevation: 81 m (266 ft)

Population (2022)
  - Čoka: 3,119
  - Metro: 8,556
- Demonym(s): Čokani, (sr)
- Time zone: UTC+1 (CET)
  - Summer (DST): UTC+2 (CEST)
- Postal code: 23320
- Area code: +381(0)230
- Car plates: KI
- Official languages: Serbian together with Hungarian
- Website: www.coka.co.rs

Čoka (Serbian Cyrillic: Чока, pronounced [t͡ʃôka]; Hungarian: Csóka, pronounced [ˈt͡ʃoːkɒ]; German: Tschoka; Slovak: Čoka) is a town and municipality located in the North Banat District of the autonomous province of Vojvodina, Serbia. The town has a population of 3,119 and the municipality has 8,556 inhabitants.

== History ==
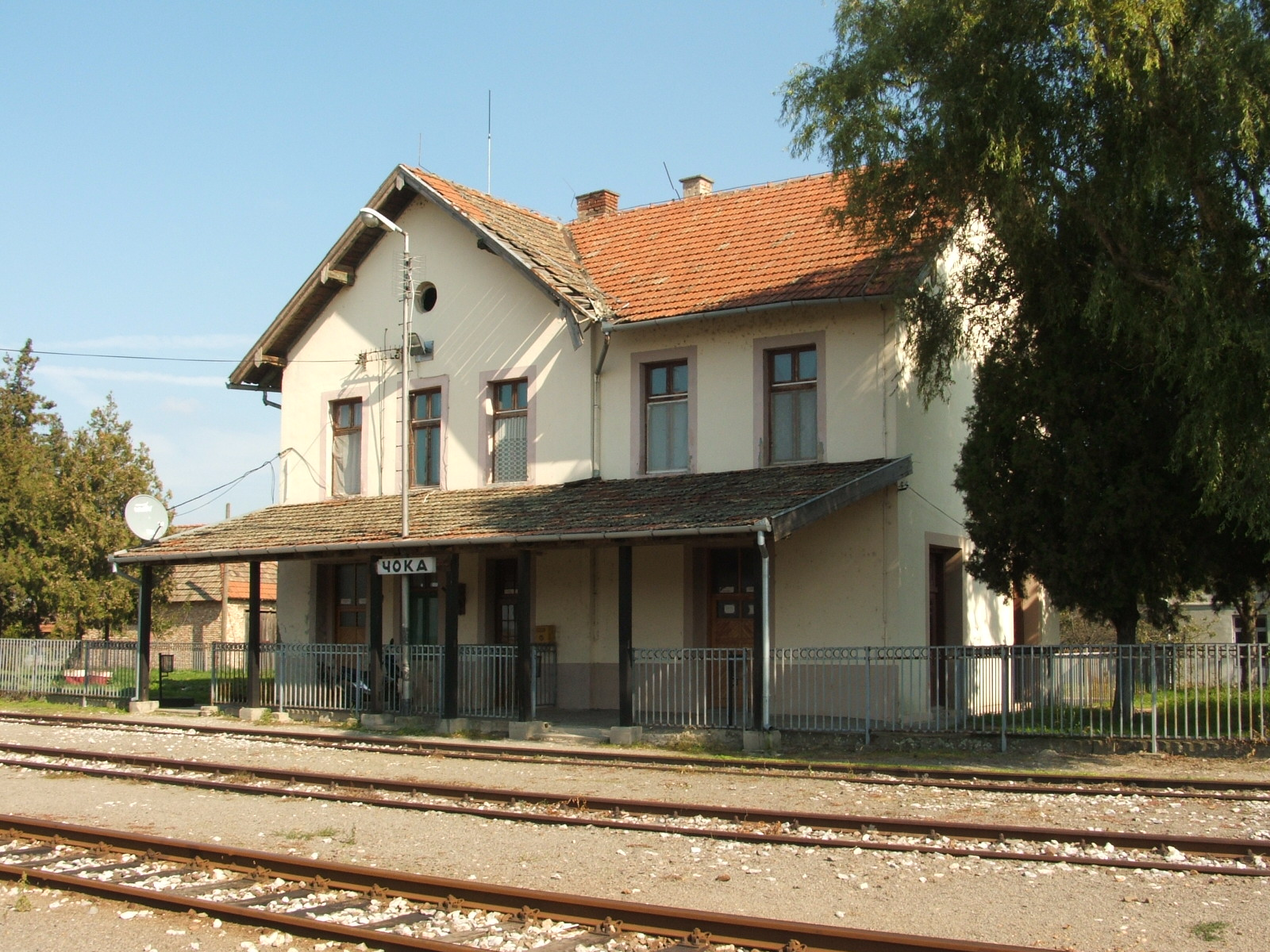
Čoka railway station

The first written record about Čoka was made in 1247. It was part of a feudal tenure of which landowners were often changed. Later the settlement was abandoned due to the dense Cuman incursions at the end of the 13th century, but it was rebuilt again in the 14th century. In 1552, it was under Ottoman administration. At that time, it had a sparse population of 13 people, and at the end of the 16th century, the hamlet dwellers numbered 4 Serb families.

In the first half of the 18th century, the Ottoman administration was replaced by the Habsburg one and according to 1717 data, there were 40 Serb houses in the village of which number increased to 192 until the middle of the 18th century, and in 1787, the number of population increased to 1,191 people.

The Lederer Mansion, also known as the "Marczibányi Mansion," is located in Čoka. It was built after 1781 when Lőrinc Marczibányi purchased the Čoka estate. The construction of the castle was completed only around 1870 by the next owner, Schwab Károly. At the end of the 19th century, Arthur and Károly Lederer acquired the estate. The property remained in the hands of the Lederer family—one of the wealthiest Jewish families of that time—until World War II. During the war, the castle was under the possession of Hermann Göring. The mansion is on the list of Immovable Cultural Heritage of Great Importance.

In 1796, the tenure owner Lőrinc Marczibányi had Hungarians settled here that Slovaks followed then., which resulted in a rapid population growth and as early as the middle of the 19th century, the population numbered 2,739 people which increased to 4,239 until 1910. According to 1910 census, Hungarians were the dominant ethnic group in the village, while there existed a sizable ethnic Serb community as well.

As of 1918, Čoka is part of the Kingdom of Serbs, Croats and Slovenes (later renamed to Yugoslavia). Until the end of World War II, it was part of Novi Kneževac municipality. Shortly afterwards, it became the seat of an own municipality, whereby it became an industrial centre of the region as well, receiving a large influx of new population. In 1991, it had a population of 5,244 people but in the next decade, the number of dwellers started to dwindle and the 2002 census recorded only 4,707 people in the settlement.

== Inhabited places ==
Čoka municipality includes the town of Čoka and seven villages. The villages are:

- Padej (Hungarian: Padé)
- Jazovo (Hungarian: Hódegyháza)
- Banatski Monoštor (Hungarian: Kanizsamonostor)
- Vrbica (Hungarian: Egyházaskér)
- Crna Bara (Hungarian: Feketetó)
- Sanad (Hungarian: Szanád)
- Ostojićevo (Hungarian: Tiszaszentmiklós)

Note: For the inhabited places with an absolute or relative Hungarian ethnic majority, the names are also given in Hungarian.

== Demographics ==
Historical population
Year	Pop.	±% p.a.
1948	19,302	—
1953	19,885	+0.60%
1961	19,482	−0.26%
1971	18,364	−0.59%
1981	16,653	−0.97%
1991	15,271	−0.86%
2002	13,832	−0.90%
2011	11,398	−2.13%
2022	8,556	−2.57%

According to the 2022 census results, the municipality of Čoka has 8,556 inhabitants.

=== Ethnic groups ===
Five local communities have a Hungarian majority: Čoka, Padej, Jazovo, Banatski Monoštor, and Vrbica. Crna Bara has a relative Hungarian majority. Sanad and Ostojićevo have Serb majorities, although the latter has over 20% Hungarians, while Čoka, Padej and Crna Bara have over 20% Serbs.

The ethnic composition of the municipality:

Ethnic group	Population	Share
Hungarians	3,835	44.8%
Serbs	3,470	40.5%
Roma	342	4%
Yugoslavs	40	0.4%
Slovaks	35	0.4%
Croats	29	0.3%
Romanians	23	0.2%
Others	782	9.1%
Total	8,556	

== Twin towns – sister cities ==
Čoka is twinned with:

- Arilje, Serbia
- Bordány, Hungary
- Decs, Hungary
- Deta, Romania
- Sokobanja, Serbia
- Wisła, Poland

== See also ==
- Municipalities of Serbia
- List of places in Serbia
- List of cities, towns and villages in Vojvodina
- North Banat District
