= Crna Bara (Čoka) =

Crna Bara Црна Бара (Serbian) Feketetó (Hungarian)
- Village (Selo)
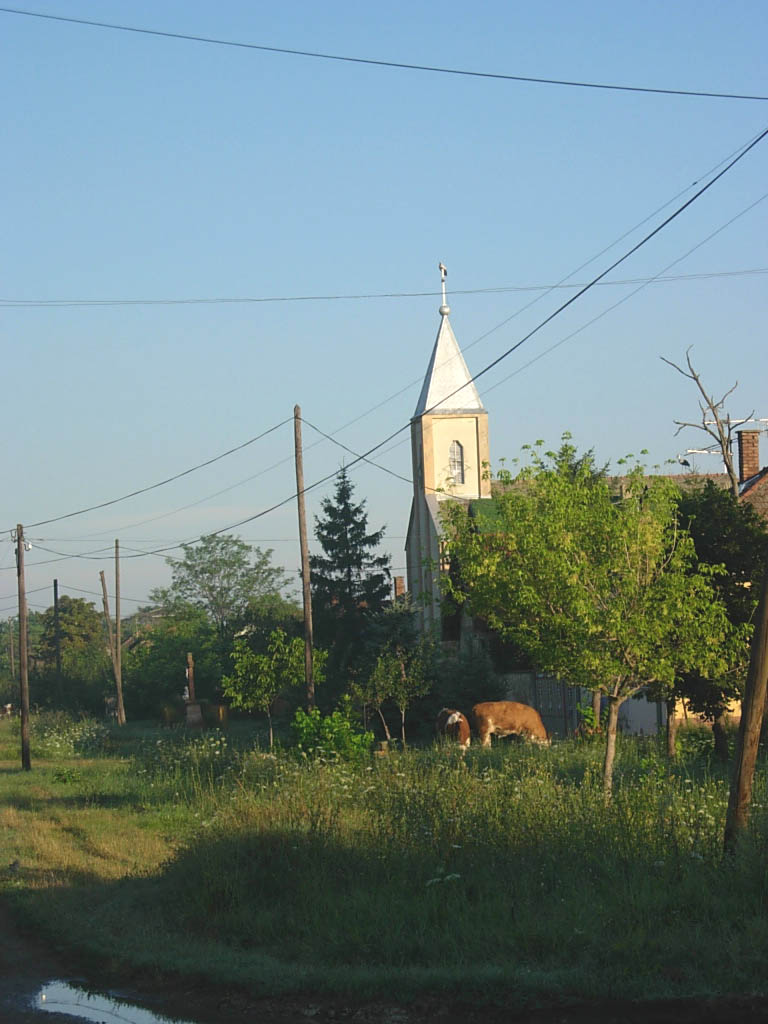
- The St. Vendelin abbot Catholic Church.

- Location within Vojvodina Location within Serbia Location within Europe
- Coordinates: 45°58′14″N 20°16′19″E
- Country: Serbia
- Province: Vojvodina
- Region: Banat
- District: North Banat
- Municipality: Čoka

Population (2002)
  - Total: 568
- Time zone: UTC+1 (CET)
  - Summer (DST): UTC+2 (CEST)

Crna Bara (Serbian Cyrillic: Црна Бара, Hungarian: Feketetó) is a village in Serbia. It is situated in the Čoka municipality, North Banat District, Vojvodina province. The village is ethnically mixed and its population numbering 568 people (2002 census).

== Ethnic groups (2002 census) ==
Population of the village include:

- 267 (47.01%) Hungarians
- 235 (41.37%) Serbs
- 21 (3.70%) Romani
- 12 (2.11%) Yugoslavs
- others.

== Historical population ==
- 1961: 950
- 1971: 823
- 1981: 678
- 1991: 595
- 2002: 568

== Politics ==
The president of the Local Community is Gabriela Nerandžić (Hungarian: Nerandzic Gabriella "Ela").

== See also ==
- List of places in Serbia
- List of cities, towns and villages in Vojvodina
