= North Banat District =

Administrative district of Serbia

North Banat District Севернобанатски округ
- Administrative district of Serbia
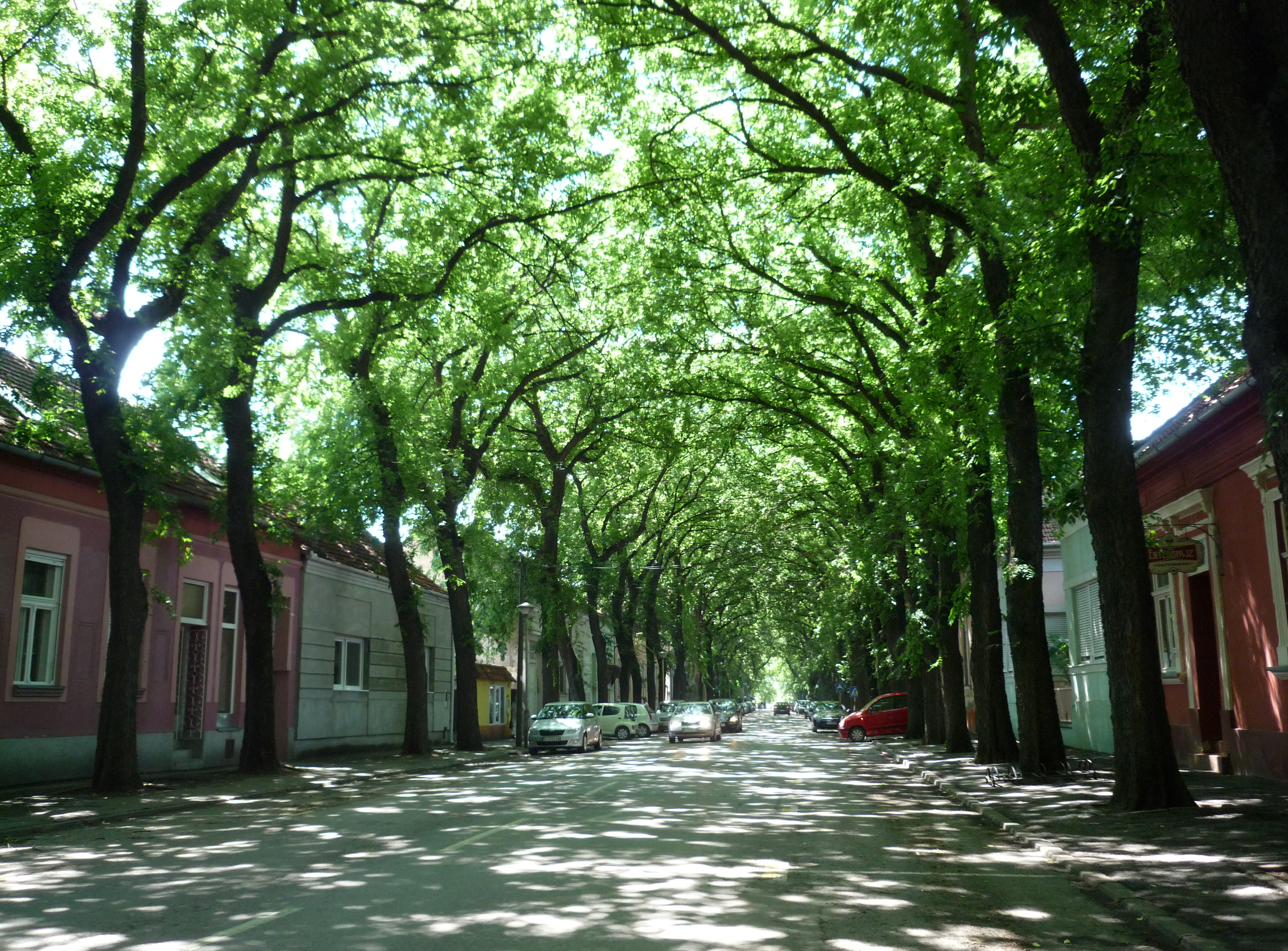
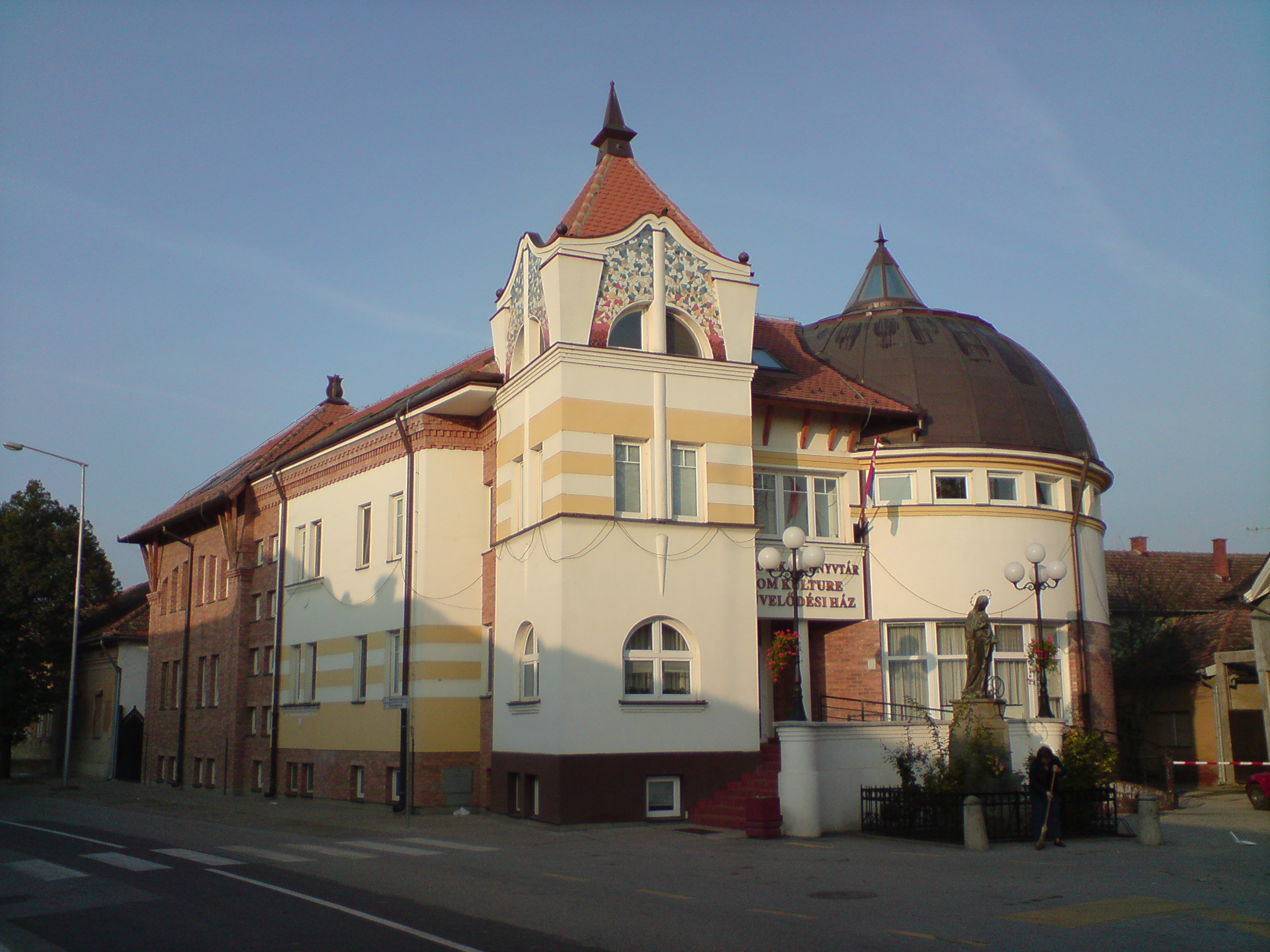
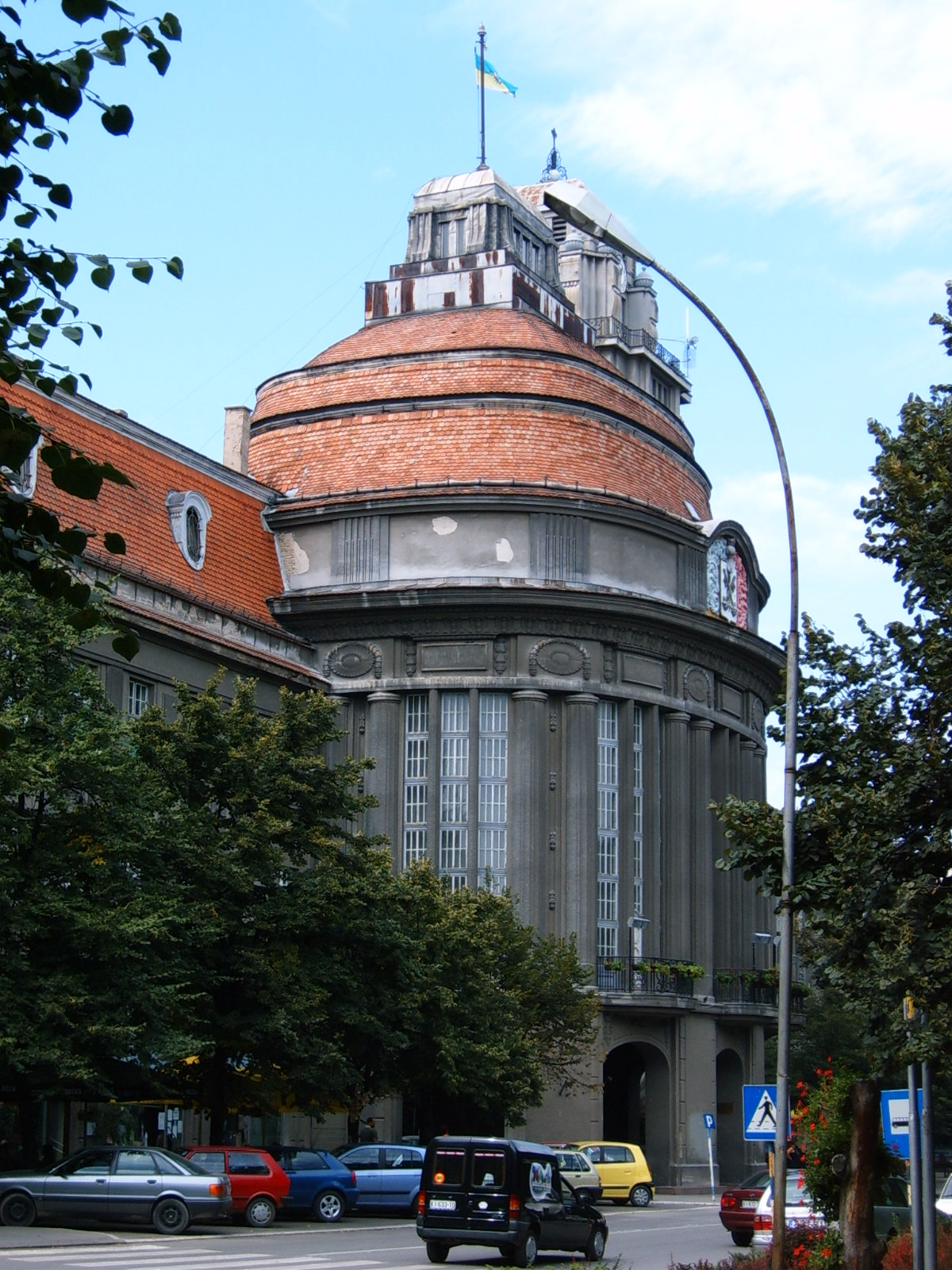
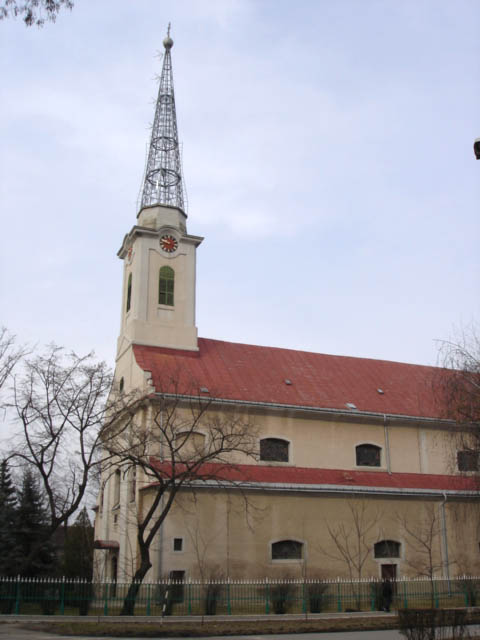
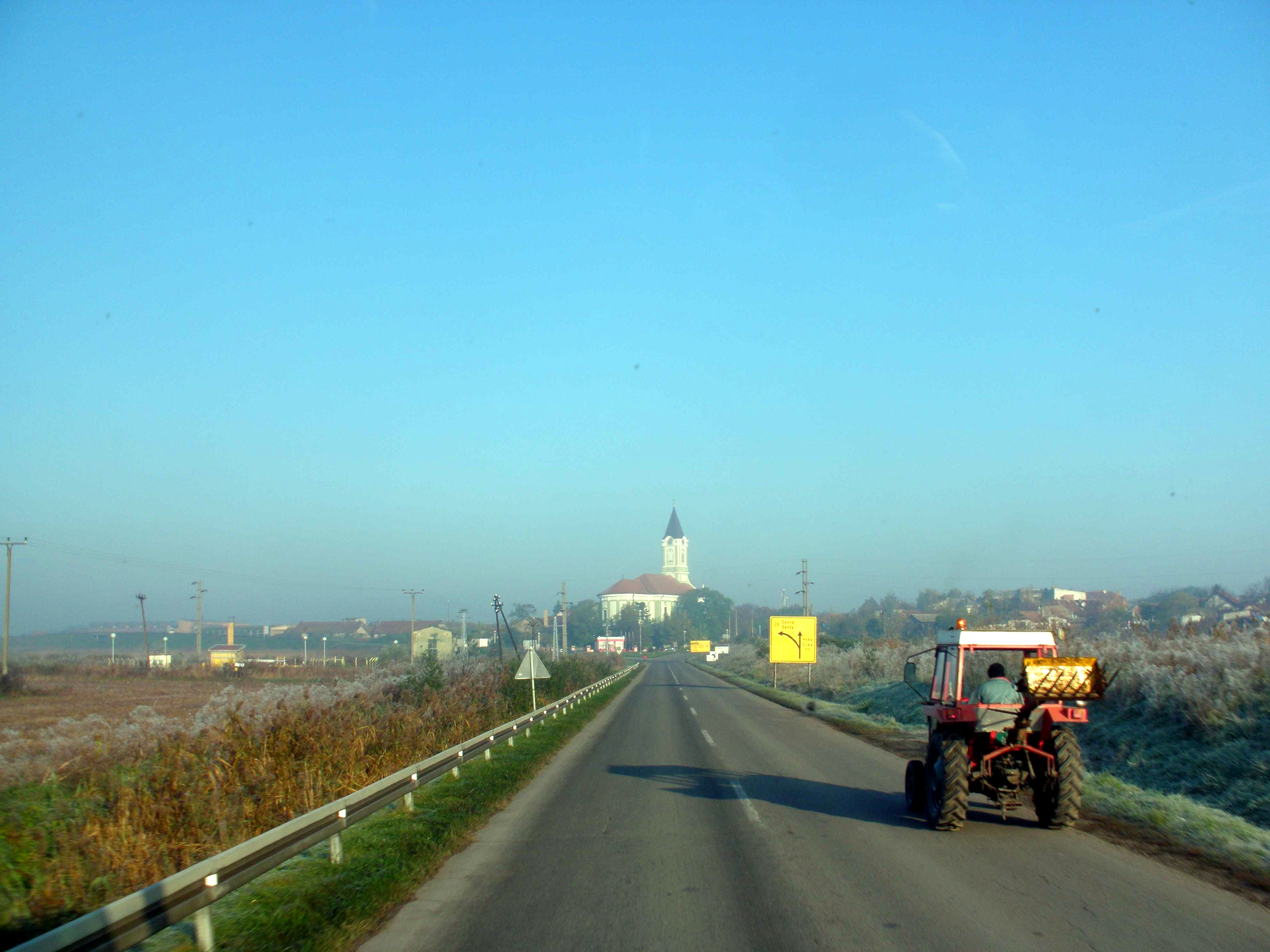
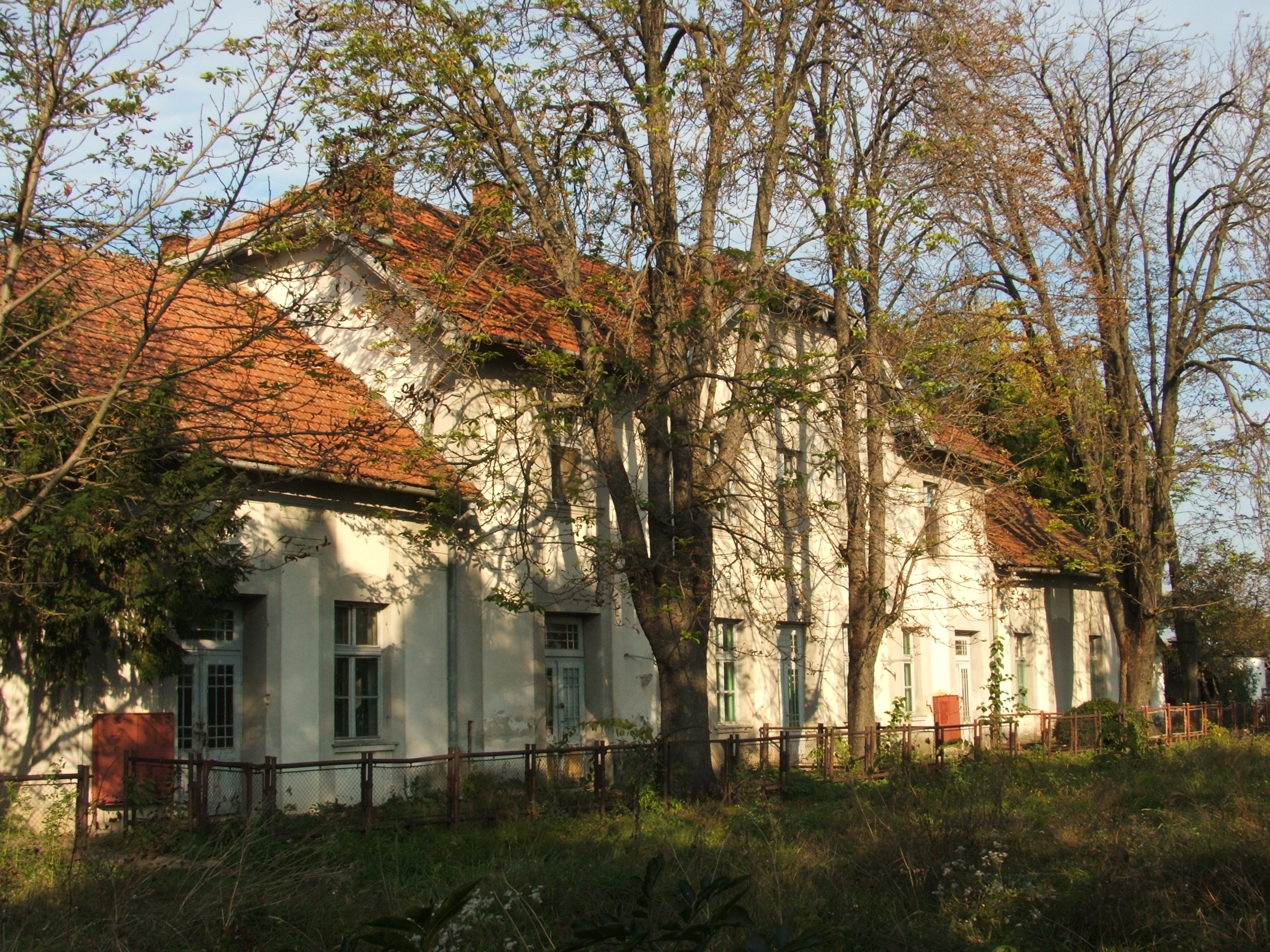
- Images from the North Banat District

- Location of district in Serbia
- Coordinates: 45°50′N 20°27′E
- Country: Serbia
- Province: Vojvodina
- Administrative center: Kikinda

Government
  - Commissioner: Nikola Lukač

Area
  - Total: 2,329 km^{2} (899 sq mi)

Population (2022)
  - Total: 117,896
  - Density: 51.2/km^{2} (133/sq mi)
- ISO 3166 code: RS-03
- Municipalities: 6
- Settlements: 50
- Cities and towns: 7
- Villages: 43
- Website: severnobanatski.okrug.gov.rs

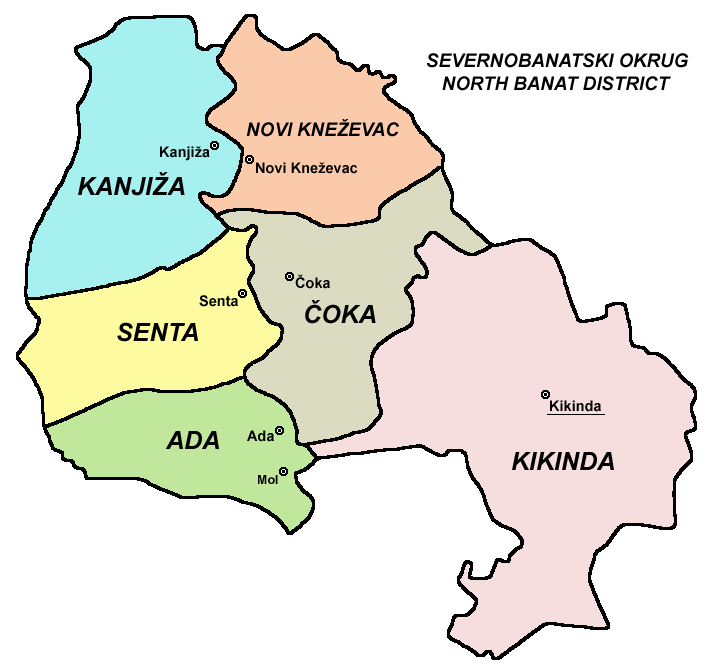
Map of the North Banat District

The North Banat District (Serbian: Севернобанатски округ, romanized: Severnobanatski okrug, pronounced [sêʋeːrnobǎnaːtskiː ôkruːɡ]) is one of administrative districts of Serbia. It lies in the geographical regions of Banat and Bačka. According to the 2022 census, the North Banat District has a population of 117,896 inhabitants. The administrative center of the district is the city of Kikinda.

== History ==
In the 9th century, the area was ruled by the Bulgarian-Slavic dukes Glad (in the east) and Salan (in the west), while in the 11th century, the eastern part of the area was ruled by duke Ahtum. From the 11th to the 16th century, during the administration of the medieval Kingdom of Hungary, the area was divided between the Csanadiensis County, Temesiensis County and Torontaliensis County in the east, and the Csongradiensis County, Bacsensis County and Bodrogiensis County in the west. Part of the area was also located within the Cumania region. From 1526 to 1527, the area was ruled by the independent Serb ruler, emperor Jovan Nenad, while during Ottoman administration (16th-18th century), it was divided between the Temeşvar Eyalet in the east and the Sanjak of Segedin in the west.

During Habsburg administration (18th century), the area was divided between the Banat of Temeswar in the east and the Military Frontier in the west. Since the abolishment of the Theiß-Marosch section of the Military Frontier (in 1751), and the abolishment of the Banat of Temeswar (in 1778), the area was divided between the Torontal County in the east and the Batsch-Bodrog County in the west, with a small part of it located within the Tschongrad County. Much of the area was part of the autonomous districts of Velika Kikinda (existed from 1774 to 1876 within the Torontal County) in the east and Potisje (existed from 1751 to 1848 within the Batsch-Bodrog County) in the west. In the 1850s, the area was divided between the Veliki Bečkerek District in the east and the Sombor and Novi Sad districts in the west. After 1860, it was again divided between Torontal, Batsch-Bodrog and Tschongrad counties.

During the Yugoslav administration (1918-1941), the area was initially (from 1918 to 1922) divided between the Veliki Bečkerek County in the east and the Novi Sad County in the west. From 1922 to 1929, it was part of the Belgrade Oblast, and from 1929 to 1941 part of the Danube Banovina.

During the German-Hungarian Axis occupation (1941-1944), the area was divided between the Banat autonomous region (part of the German-occupied puppet state of Serbia) in the east and the Bács-Bodrog County (an administrative unit of Horthy's Hungary) in the west. Initially, the Banat region was part of the rump Danube Banovina (whose capital was moved to Smederevo), but from December 1941, it was organized as one of the districts of Serbia and was officially named the District of Veliki Bečkerek.

From 1944, the area was part of autonomous Yugoslav Vojvodina (which was part of newly established Socialist Republic of Serbia from 1945). The present-day administrative districts of Serbia (including the North Banat District) were established in 1992 by the decree of the Government of Serbia.

== Cities and municipalities ==
The North Banat District encompasses the territories of one city and five municipalities:

- Kikinda (city)
- Ada (Hungarian: Ada) (municipality)
- Čoka (Hungarian: Csóka) (municipality)
- Kanjiža (Hungarian: Magyarkanizsa) (municipality)
- Novi Kneževac (municipality)
- Senta (Hungarian: Zenta) (municipality)

An interesting fact is that the first three municipalities enlisted (Kanjiža, Senta, and Ada) are geographically, in fact, in the Bačka region, since the natural border between Banat and Bačka is the river Tisa.

== Demographics ==
Historical population
Year	Pop.	±%
1948	189,050	—
1953	189,414	+0.2%
1961	194,150	+2.5%
1971	191,632	−1.3%
1981	187,179	−2.3%
1991	179,783	−4.0%
2002	165,881	−7.7%
2011	147,770	−10.9%
2022	117,896	−20.2%

=== Towns ===
There are two towns with over 10,000 inhabitants.

- Kikinda: 32,084
- Senta: 14,452

=== Ethnic structure ===
Ethnicity	Population	Share
Serbs	51,848	44%
Hungarians	50,643	43%
Roma	4,277	3.6%
Others	2,877	2.4%
Undeclared/Unknown	8,251	7%

The municipalities with a Serb ethnic majority are Kikinda (75.8%) and Novi Kneževac (58%); the municipalities with a Hungarian ethnic majority are: Kanjiža (83.1%), Senta (75.7%), Ada (72.7%), while municipality with Hungarian relative ethnic majority is Čoka (44.8%). As for the local communities, 29 have a Hungarian ethnic majority, 19 have a Serb ethnic majority, and 2 are ethnically mixed, with a Hungarian relative ethnic majority.

== See also ==
- Administrative districts of Serbia
- Administrative divisions of Serbia
- District of Velika Kikinda
