= State Road 12 (Serbia) =

Road in Serbia

State Road 12
- Serbian: Državni put IB reda 12; Serbian Cyrillic: Државни пут IБ реда 12

Route information
- Part of E662 (Subotica – Sombor)
- Maintained by JP "Putevi Srbije"
- Length: 276.837 km (172.019 mi)

Major junctions
- From: Subotica
- 105 in Bajmok; 304 in Svetozar Miletić; 15 in Sombor; 17 in Srpski Miletić; 110 near Odžaci; 112 near Bač; 108 near Bačka Palanka; 306 in Čelarevo; 100 in Novi Sad; 21 in Novi Sad; A1 near Novi Sad; 129 near Kać; 114 near Žabalj; 13 in Zrenjanin; 18 in Zrenjanin; 118 in Žitište; 117 in Banatsko Karađorđevo; 104 near Vojvoda Stepa
- To: Serbia – Romania border at Srpska Crnja

Location
- Country: Serbia
- Districts: North Bačka, West Bačka, South Bačka, Central Banat

Highway system
- Roads in Serbia; Motorways
← 11	→ 13

State Road 12, is an IB-class road in northern Serbia, connecting Subotica with Romania. It is located in Vojvodina.

Before the new road categorization regulation given in 2013, the route wore the following names: M 17.1, M 18, P 101 and M 7 (before 2012) / 12, 28, 19, 102, 20, 11, and 108 (after 2012).

The existing route is a main road with two traffic lanes. By the valid Space Plan of Republic of Serbia the road is not planned for upgrading to motorway, and is expected to be conditioned in its current state.

Road section from Subotica to Sombor is a part of European route E662.

== Sections ==
Section number	Length	Distance	Section name
01201	19.233 km (11.951 mi)	19.233 km (11.951 mi)	Subotica (Sombor) – Bajmok
01202	21.671 km (13.466 mi)	40.904 km (25.417 mi)	Bajmok – Svetozar Miletić
01203	12.709 km (7.897 mi)	53.613 km (33.314 mi)	Svetozar Miletić – Sombor (Bezdan)
01204	4.215 km (2.619 mi)	57.828 km (35.933 mi)	Sombor (Bezdan) – Sombor (Apatin) (overlap with)
01205	2.518 km (1.565 mi)/0.099 km (0.062 mi)	60.346 km (37.497 mi)	Sombor (Apatin) – Sombor (industrial zone) (overlap with)
01206	24.976 km (15.519 mi)/0.721 km (0.448 mi)	85.322 km (53.017 mi)	Sombor (industrial zone) – Srpski Miletić
01207	9.378 km (5.827 mi)	94.700 km (58.844 mi)	Srpski Miletić – Odžaci (Kula)
01208	13.592 km (8.446 mi)	108.292 km (67.290 mi)	Odžaci (Kula) – Bač
01209	22.142 km (13.758 mi)	130.434 km (81.048 mi)	Bač – Bačka Palanka (bypass)
01210	10.846 km (6.739 mi)/0.381 km (0.237 mi)	141.280 km (87.787 mi)	Bačka Palanka (bypass) – Čelarevo
01211	28.877 km (17.943 mi)/8.921 km (5.543 mi)	170.157 km (105.731 mi)	Čelarevo – Novi Sad (Rumenka)
01212	2.220 km (1.379 mi)/2.224 km (1.382 mi)	172.377 km (107.110 mi)	Novi Sad (Rumenka) – Novi Sad (Sirig)
01213	4.228 km (2.627 mi)/4.219 km (2.622 mi)	176.605 km (109.737 mi)	Novi Sad (Sirig) – Novi Sad-east interchange
01214	3.742 km (2.325 mi)/0.422 km (0.262 mi)	180.347 km (112.062 mi)	Novi Sad-east interchange – Kać
01215	13.330 km (8.283 mi)	193.677 km (120.345 mi)	Kać – Žabalj (Šajkaš)
01216	26.686 km (16.582 mi)/2.420 km (1.504 mi)	220.363 km (136.927 mi)	Žabalj (Šajkaš) – Zrenjanin (Kikinda)
01217	1.662 km (1.033 mi)/1.671 km (1.038 mi)	222.025 km (137.960 mi)	Zrenjanin (Kikinda) – Zrenjanin (Ečka) (overlap with)
01218	2.410 km (1.498 mi)/2.108 km (1.310 mi)	224.435 km (139.457 mi)	Zrenjanin (Ečka) – Zrenjanin (Sečanj)
01219	14.636 km (9.094 mi)/2.253 km (1.400 mi)	239.071 km (148.552 mi)	Zrenjanin (Sečanj) – Žitište
01220	15.055 km (9.355 mi)	254.126 km (157.907 mi)	Žitište – Banatsko Karađorđevo
01221	8.292 km (5.152 mi)	262.418 km (163.059 mi)	Banatsko Karađorđevo – Nova Crnja
01222	4.414 km (2.743 mi)	266.832 km (165.802 mi)	Nova Crnja – Vojvoda Stepa
01223	10.005 km (6.217 mi)	276.837 km (172.019 mi)	Vojvoda Stepa – Serbia-Romania border (Srpska Crnja)

== See also ==
- Roads in Serbia
- European route E662
