= State Road 13 (Serbia) =

Road in Serbia

State Road 13
- Serbian: Državni put IB reda 13; Serbian Cyrillic: Државни пут IБ реда 13

Route information
- Maintained by JP "Putevi Srbije"
- Length: 194.761 km (121.019 mi)

Major junctions
- From: Horgoš E75
- 100 near Horgoš; 102 in Kanjiža; 103 in Novi Kneževac; 105 in Čoka; 15 in Kikinda; 117 in Bašaid; 116 in Melenci; 12 in Zrenjanin; 130 in Ečka; 129 near Perlez; 131 near Čenta
- To: Belgrade E70

Location
- Country: Serbia
- Districts: North Banat, Central Banat, City of Belgrade

Highway system
- Roads in Serbia; Motorways
← 12	→ 14

State Road 13, is an IB-class road, located in northern Serbia, connecting Horgoš with Belgrade. It is located in Vojvodina and City of Belgrade.

Before the new road categorization regulation given in 2013, the route wore the following names: O 10, M 22.1, P 119, P 111, P 112, M 24, M 3 and M 24.1 (before 2012) / 102, 11, and 104 (after 2012).

The existing route is a main road with two traffic lanes, except for Kovilovo interchange – Belgrade (printing company) section, which has been done in dual-carriageway six-lane configuration. By the valid Space Plan of Republic of Serbia the road is not planned for upgrading to motorway, and is expected to be conditioned in its current state.

== Sections ==
Section number	Length	Distance	Section name
01301	0.796 km (0.495 mi)	0.796 km (0.495 mi)	Horgoš interchange – Horgoš
01302	0.230 km (0.143 mi)	1.026 km (0.638 mi)	Horgoš – Horgoš (Kanjiža) (overlap with)
01303	11.956 km (7.429 mi)	12.982 km (8.067 mi)	Horgoš (Kanjiža) – Kanjiža
01304	7.080 km (4.399 mi)	20.062 km (12.466 mi)	Kanjiža – Novi Kneževac (Đala)
01305	12.444 km (7.732 mi)	32.506 km (20.198 mi)	Novi Kneževac (Đala) – Čoka (Crna Bara)
01306	12.444 km (7.732 mi)	32.883 km (20.433 mi)	Čoka (Crna Bara) – Čoka (Senta) (overlap with)
01307	34.906 km (21.690 mi)/0.129 km (0.080 mi)	67.789 km (42.122 mi)	Čoka (Senta) – Kikinda (Nakovo)
01308	3.132 km (1.946 mi)	70.921 km (44.068 mi)	Kikinda (Nakovo) – Kikinda (Novi Bečej) (overlap with)
01309	19.577 km (12.165 mi)	90.498 km (56.233 mi)	Kikinda (Novi Bečej) – Bašaid (Novi Bečej)
01310	15.999 km (9.941 mi)	106.497 km (66.174 mi)	Bašaid (Novi Bečej) – Melenci
01311	15.704 km (9.758 mi)	122.201 km (75.932 mi)	Melenci – Zrenjanin (Kikinda)
01217	1.662 km (1.033 mi)	123.863 km (76.965 mi)	Zrenjanin (Kikinda) – Zrenjanin (Ečka) (overlap with)
01312	8.629 km (5.362 mi)/0.083 km (0.052 mi)	132.492 km (82.327 mi)	Zrenjanin (Ečka) – Ečka
01313	12.347 km (7.672 mi)	144.839 km (89.999 mi)	Ečka – Perlez (Titel)
01314	2.487 km (1.545 mi)	147.326 km (91.544 mi)	Perlez (Titel) – Perlez (Kovačica) (overlap with)
01315	9.694 km (6.024 mi)	157.020 km (97.568 mi)	Perlez (Kovačica) – Čenta
01316	2.828 km (1.757 mi)	159.848 km (99.325 mi)	Čenta – Vojvodina border (Belgrade – Čenta)
01317	22.678 km (14.091 mi)	182.526 km (113.416 mi)	Vojvodina border (Belgrade – Čenta) – Kovilovo interchange
01318/01319	12.235 km (7.602 mi) (both directions)	194.761 km (121.019 mi)	Kovilovo interchange – Belgrade (printing company)

== See also ==
- Roads in Serbia
