= State Road 15 (Serbia) =

Road in Serbia

State Road 15
- Serbian: Državni put IB reda 15; Serbian Cyrillic: Државни пут IБ реда 15

Route information
- Part of E662 (Bezdan – Sombor)
- Maintained by JP "Putevi Srbije"
- Length: 183.468 km (114.002 mi)

Major junctions
- From: Hungary – Serbia border at Bački Breg
- 16 in Bezdan; 12 in Sombor; 107 in Sombor; 304 in Kljajićevo; 106 in Kljajićevo; 108 in Kula; 305 in Vrbas; 113 in Vrbas; 100 in Srbobran; 102 in Bečej; 116 near Novi Bečej; 117 in Novi Bečej; 13 in Kikinda; 104 in Kikinda
- To: Serbia – Romania border at Nakovo, Road DJ594A

Location
- Country: Serbia
- Districts: West Bačka, South Bačka, North Banat

Highway system
- Roads in Serbia; Motorways
← 14	→ 16

State Road 15, is an IB-class road in northern Serbia, connecting Hungary at Bački Breg with Romania at Nakovo. It is located in Vojvodina.

Before the new road categorization regulation given in 2013, the route wore the following names: M 18, P 101, M 3 and P 114 (before 2012) / 28, 19, 104, 11 and 100 (after 2012).

The existing route is a main road with two traffic lanes. By the valid Space Plan of Republic of Serbia the road is not planned for upgrading to motorway, and is expected to be conditioned in its current state.

Section from Bezdan to Sombor is a part of European route E662.

== Sections ==
Section number	Length	Distance	Section name
01501	8.581 km (5.332 mi)	8.581 km (5.332 mi)	Hungary – Serbia border (Bački Breg) – Bezdan
01502	15.670 km (9.737 mi)	24.251 km (15.069 mi)	Bezdan – Sombor (Bezdan)
01204	4.215 km (2.619 mi)	28.466 km (17.688 mi)	Sombor (Bezdan) – Sombor (Apatin) (overlap with)
01205	2.518 km (1.565 mi)	30.984 km (19.253 mi)	Sombor (Apatin) – Sombor (industrial zone) (overlap with)
01503	12.867 km (7.995 mi)	43.851 km (27.248 mi)	Sombor (industrial zone) – Kljajićevo (Svetozar Miletić)
01504	1.373 km (0.853 mi)	45.224 km (28.101 mi)	Kljajićevo (Svetozar Miletić) – Kljajićevo (Bački Sokolac)
01505	26.561 km (16.504 mi)	71.785 km (44.605 mi)	Kljajićevo (Bački Sokolac) – Kula (Bačka Topola)
01506	11.046 km (6.864 mi)	82.831 km (51.469 mi)	Kula (Bačka Topola) – Vrbas (Savino Selo)
01507	2.527 km (1.570 mi)	85.358 km (53.039 mi)	Vrbas (Savino Selo) – Vrbas (Zmajevo)
01508	1.385 km (0.861 mi)	86.743 km (53.900 mi)	Vrbas (Zmajevo) – Vrbas (Feketić) (overlap with)
01509	3.780 km (2.349 mi)	90.523 km (56.248 mi)	Vrbas (Feketić) – Vrbas interchange
01510	5.561 km (3.455 mi)	96.084 km (59.704 mi)	Vrbas interchange – Srbobran (Feketić)
01511	18.846 km (11.710 mi)	114.930 km (71.414 mi)	Srbobran (Feketić) – Bečej (Ada)
01512	3.587 km (2.229 mi)	118.517 km (73.643 mi)	Bečej (Ada) – Bečej (Bačko Gradište) (overlap with)
01513	9.584 km (5.955 mi)	128.101 km (79.598 mi)	Bečej (Bačko Gradište) – Novi Bečej (Melenci)
01514	3.524 km (2.190 mi)	131.625 km (81.788 mi)	Novi Bečej (Melenci) – Novi Bečej (Bašaid)
01515	34.550 km (21.468 mi)	166.175 km (103.256 mi)	Novi Bečej (Bašaid) – Kikinda (Novi Bečej)
01308	3.132 km (1.946 mi)	169.307 km (105.202 mi)	Kikinda (Novi Bečej) – Kikinda (Nakovo) (overlap with)
01516	3.879 km (2.410 mi)	173.186 km (107.613 mi)	Kikinda (Nakovo) – Kikinda (Mokrin)
01517	2.068 km (1.285 mi)	175.254 km (108.898 mi)	Kikinda (Mokrin) – Kikinda (Vojvoda Stepa) (overlap with)
01518	8.214 km (5.104 mi)	183.468 km (114.002 mi)	Kikinda (Vojvoda Stepa) – Serbia – Romania border (Nakovo)

== See also ==
- Roads in Serbia
- European route E662
