= List of Serbian regions by GDP =

This is a list of statistical regions and administrative districts of Serbia by GDP, GDP per capita, and GVA.

== Statistical regions ==
=== GDP (2025) ===
Rank	Region	RSD	$	€
1	Belgrade	4,686 billion	46.8 billion	39.9 billion
2	Vojvodina	2,959 billion	29.6 billion	25.2 billion
3	Šumadija and Western Serbia	2,029 billion	20.2 billion	17.3 billion
4	Southern and Eastern Serbia	1,536 billion	15.3 billion	13.9 billion
	TOTAL	11,211 billion	112.1 billion	94.7 billion

=== GDP per capita (2025) ===
Rank	Region	RSD	$	€
1	Belgrade	2,787,000	27,870	23,759
2	Vojvodina	1,700,700	17,007	14,498
3	Šumadija and Western Serbia	1,115,400	11,154	9,508
4	Southern and Eastern Serbia	1,092,400	10,924	9,312
	TOTAL	1,729,000	17,290	14,740

== Administrative districts ==
=== GDP (PPP) per capita (2018) ===
Administrative district	€
Belgrade	20,500
West Bačka District	8,700
South Banat District	10,800
South Bačka District	14,200
North Banat District	9,400
North Bačka District	10,700
Central Banat District	10,600
Srem District	11,200
Zlatibor District	9,000
Kolubara District	8,800
Mačva District	7,300
Moravica District	10,400
Pomoravlje District	7,200
Rasina District	7,200
Raška District	6,300
Šumadija District	9,300
Bor District	11,500
Braničevo District	10,100
Zaječar District	6,800
Jablanica District	5,700
Nišava District	8,800
Pirot District	10,700
Podunavlje District	6,500
Pčinja District	5,600
Toplica District	7,100

=== GVA (2018) ===
Administrative district	RSD
Belgrade	1,736,133,000,000
West Bačka District	75,188,000,000
South Banat District	151,448,000,000
South Bačka District	439,754,000,000
North Banat District	64,081,000,000
North Bačka District	95,723,000,000
Central Banat District	93,243,000,000
Srem District	168,192,000,000
Zlatibor District	120,469,000,000
Kolubara District	71,993,000,000
Mačva District	102,502,000,000
Moravica District	104,149,000,000
Pomoravlje District	71,751,000,000
Rasina District	81,109,000,000
Raška District	95,902,000,000
Šumadija District	131,328,000,000
Bor District	64,920,000,000
Braničevo District	84,540,000,000
Zaječar District	36,467,000,000
Jablanica District	56,984,000,000
Nišava District	160,330,000,000
Pirot District	45,402,000,000
Podunavlje District	60,350,000,000
Pčinja District	54,828,000,000
Toplica District	29,710,000,000
not regionalised	2,231,000,000
TOTAL	4,198,729

=== GVA per capita (2018) ===
Administrative district	RSD
Belgrade	1,027,000
West Bačka District	434,000
South Banat District	542,000
South Bačka District	711,000
North Banat District	468,000
North Bačka District	534,000
Central Banat District	531,000
Srem District	562,000
Zlatibor District	449,000
Kolubara District	440,000
Mačva District	366,000
Moravica District	520,000
Pomoravlje District	359,000
Rasina District	362,000
Raška District	314,000
Šumadija District	464,000
Bor District	575,000
Braničevo District	503,000
Zaječar District	338,000
Jablanica District	283,000
Nišava District	442,000
Pirot District	535,000
Podunavlje District	323,000
Pčinja District	278,000
Toplica District	353,000
TOTAL	601,000

== See also ==
- Economy of Serbia
- List of Serbian regions by HDI
