= European route E662 =

Road in trans-European E-road network

E662

Route information
- Length: 132 km (82 mi)

Major junctions
- From: A1 near Subotica
- 12 near Subotica; 12 and 15 in Sombor; 15 in Bezdan D7 near Karanac

- To: D2 in Osijek

Location
- Countries: Serbia, Croatia
- Major cities: Subotica, Sombor, Osijek

Highway system
- International E-road network; A Class; B Class

European route E662 is a class B road, part of International E-road network in Serbia and Croatia. It connects E75 at Subotica, and E73 road at Osijek.

== Itinerary ==
Serbia

- 11: Subotica south interchange (A1) – Subotica
- 12: Subotica – Mala Bosna – Mišićevo – Bajmok – Aleksa Šantić – Svetozar Miletić – Sombor
- 15: Sombor – Bezdan
- 16: Bezdan – Bezdan border crossing – 51st division bridge over the river Danube

Croatia

- D212: Batina border crossing – Batina – Zmajevac – Kneževi Vinogradi – Karanac
- D7: Kozarac – Švajcarnica – Bridge over the river Drava – Osijek (D2 at Frigis interchange)

== See also ==
- Roads in Croatia
- Roads in Serbia
