= State Road 16 (Serbia) =

Road in Serbia

State Road 16
- Serbian: Državni put IB reda 16; Serbian Cyrillic: Државни пут IБ реда 16

Route information
- Part of E662
- Maintained by JP "Putevi Srbije"
- Length: 7.590 km (4.716 mi)

Major junctions
- From: Croatia – Serbia border at Bezdan E662
- To: Bezdan E662

Location
- Country: Serbia
- Districts: West Bačka

Highway system
- Roads in Serbia; Motorways
← 15	→ 17

State Road 16, is an IB-class road in northern Serbia, connecting Croatia at Bezdan with State Road 15. It is located in Vojvodina.

Before the new road categorization regulation given in 2013, the route wore the following names: M 17.1 (before 2012) / 30 (after 2012).

The existing route is a main road with two traffic lanes and a part of European route E662. By the valid Space Plan of Republic of Serbia the road is not planned for upgrading to motorway, and is expected to be conditioned in its current state.

== Sections ==
Section number	Length	Distance	Section name
01601	7.590 km (4.716 mi)	7.590 km (4.716 mi)	Croatia – Serbia border (Bezdan) – Bezdan

== See also ==
- Roads in Serbia
- European route E662
