= State Road 101 (Serbia) =

IIA-class road in northern Serbia

State Road 101
- Serbian: Državni put II reda 101; Serbian Cyrillic: Државни пут II реда 101
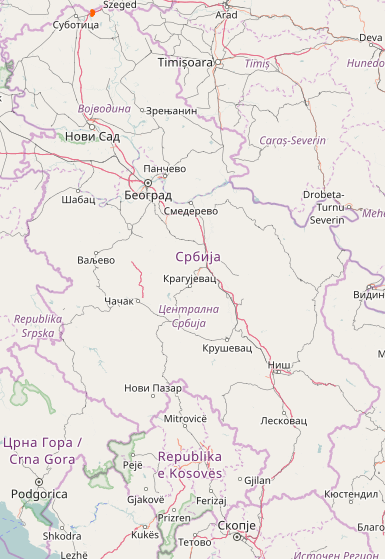

Route information
- Maintained by JP "Putevi Srbije"
- Length: 4.336 km (2.694 mi)

Major junctions
- From: Hungary – Serbia border at Bački Vinogradi
- To: Bački Vinogradi

Location
- Country: Serbia
- Districts: North Bačka

Highway system
- Roads in Serbia; Motorways
← 100	→ 102

State Road 101, is an IIA-class road in northern Serbia, connecting Hungary at Bački Vinogradi with State Road 100. It is located in Vojvodina.

The existing route is a regional road with two traffic lanes. By the valid Space Plan of Republic of Serbia the road is not planned for upgrading to main road, and is expected to be conditioned in its current state.

== Sections ==
Section number	Length	Distance	Section name
10101	4.336 km (2.694 mi)	4.336 km (2.694 mi)	Hungary – Serbia border (Bački Vinogradi) – Bački Vinogradi

== See also ==
- Roads in Serbia
