= Vladislav Živanović =

Serbian politician

Vladislav Živanović (Serbian Cyrillic: Владислав Живановић; born 22 January 1974) is a politician in Serbia. He has served in the municipal government of Sombor and was elected to the Assembly of Vojvodina in the 2020 provincial election. Živanović is a member of the Movement for the Restoration of the Kingdom of Serbia (Pokret obnove Kraljevine Srbije, POKS).

== Early life and career ==
Živanović was born in Sombor, Vojvodina, in what was then the Socialist Republic of Serbia in the Socialist Federal Republic of Yugoslavia. He was raised in the municipality, trained in catering and worked in the field for a number of years, and began working for the PTT Saobracaja Srbija in 2006. In 2012, he was certified as a professional economist.

== Politician ==
=== Municipal politics ===
Živanović entered political life as a member of the Serbian Renewal Movement (Srpski pokret obnove, SPO). He received the fourth position on the SPO's electoral list for the Sombor municipal assembly in the 2012 Serbian local elections and was elected when the list won four mandates. He served in the assembly for two years and was appointed as deputy mayor in April 2014 when a new local coalition government was formed. At the time of his appointment, he was president of the SPO for the West Bačka District and a member of its executive board at the republic level. During this period, Živanović also chaired Sombor's committee for traffic safety.

He was promoted to the second position on the SPO's list in the 2016 local elections and was elected to a second term when the list again won four seats. He became a member of city council (i.e., the executive branch of the city government) after the election, with responsibility of co-ordinating projects of importance for the city. He stood down from the council in 2017.

The SPO split in 2017, and several dissident members left the party to form the POKS. Živanović was a founding member of the new party and was chosen as president of its city board in Sombor in September 2017. He also became president of the POKS executive board for Vojvodina when the provincial wing was formally established in December 2017.

He appeared in the lead position on the POKS list for the Sombor municipal assembly in the 2020 local elections and was re-elected when the list won five mandates.

=== Member of the Assembly of Vojvodina ===
Živanović received the second position on the POKS list for the Vojvodina provincial assembly in the 2020 provincial election and was elected when the list won five mandates. He is currently the deputy leader of the POKS group in the assembly, the leader of the committee on co-operation with the national assembly committees in the exercise of competencies of the province, and a member of the committee on health, social policy, labour, demographic policy, and social child care.
