= Belić, Valjevo =

Belić Белић
- Village
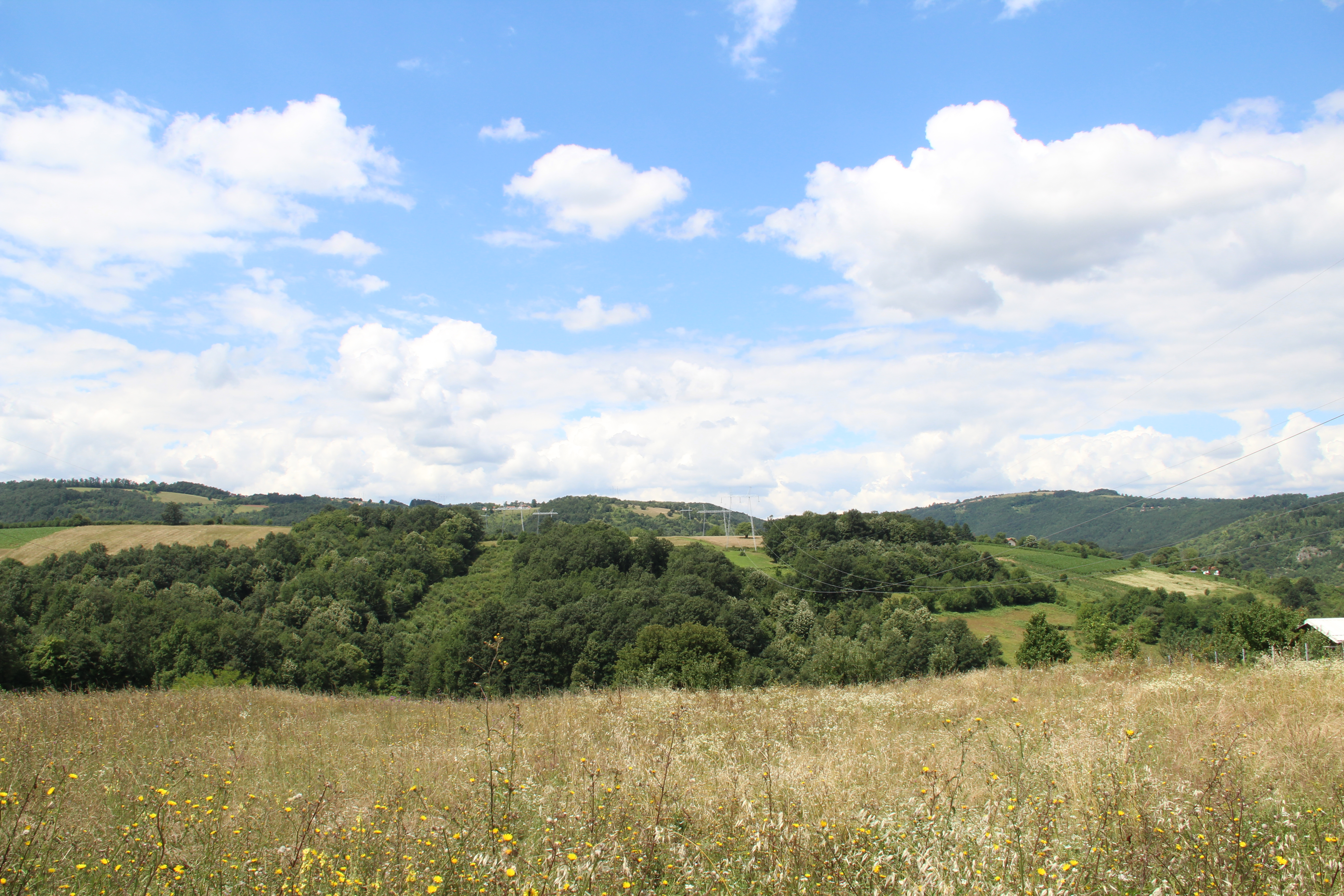
- Panorama of Belić.

- Location within Serbia
- Coordinates: 44°14′18″N 19°54′23″E
- Country: Serbia
- Region: Šumadija and Western Serbia
- District: Kolubara
- Municipality: Valjevo
- Elevation: 922 ft (281 m)

Population (2011)
  - Total: 109
- Time zone: UTC+1 (CET)
  - Summer (DST): UTC+2 (CEST)

Belić is a village in the municipality of Valjevo, Serbia. According to the 2011 census, the village has a population of 108 inhabitants.

== Population ==
Population of Belić
Year	Population
1948	142
1953	140
1961	135
1971	133
1981	118
1991	113
2002	124
2011	109
