= List of Serbian regions by Human Development Index =

This is a list of statistical regions and administrative districts of Serbia by Human Development Index as of 2022.

== Statistical regions ==
Rank	Statistical region	HDI
Very high human development
1	Belgrade	0.877
–	Serbia (average)	0.806
High human development
2	Vojvodina	0.799
3	Šumadija and Western Serbia	0.765
4	Southern and Eastern Serbia	0.757

== Administrative districts ==
Rank	Administrative district	HDI
Very high human development
1	Belgrade	0.877
2	South Bačka District	0.831
–	Serbia (average)	0.806
High human development
3	Nišava District	0.793
4	Srem District	0.791
5	Šumadija District	0.790
6	Podunavlje District	0.790
7	North Bačka District	0.789
8	South Banat District	0.786
9	Central Banat District	0.781
10	Zlatibor District	0.773
11	West Bačka District	0.773
12	Bor District	0.772
13	Pirot District	0.771
14	North Banat District	0.764
15	Kolubara District	0.758
16	Rasina District	0.756
17	Raška District	0.753
18	Mačva District	0.748
19	Pomoravlje District	0.745
20	Moravica District	0.744
21	Braničevo District	0.739
22	Pčinja District	0.737
23	Toplica District	0.736
24	Zaječar District	0.732
25	Jablanica District	0.730

== See also ==
- Economy of Serbia
- List of Serbian regions by GDP
