= Gaja Alaga =

Croatian physicist

Gaja Alaga (3 July 1924 – 7 September 1988) was a Croatian theoretical physicist who specialised in nuclear physics.

He was born in noble family of Bunjevac origin in the village of Lemeš (today called Svetozar Miletić) in northwestern Bačka in Kingdom of SHS (today in autonomous province Vojvodina, Serbia).

He was a corresponding member of the Croatian Academy of Sciences and Arts since 1968 and a professor at the University of Zagreb Faculty of Science (Croatian: Prirodoslovno-matematički fakultet). He worked in the Ruđer Bošković Institute in Zagreb (the capital city of Croatia), the Niels Bohr Institute in Copenhagen, the University of California, Berkeley, and LMU Munich.

In 1955, cooperating with Kurt Alder and Ben Roy Mottelson, Alaga discovered the K-selection rules and intensity rules for beta and gamma transitions in deformed atom nuclei. This discovery was key to the development of new nuclei models which confirmed that subatomic particles can distort the shape of the nucleus. This is by the model for collective motion (based on nuclei deformed from a spherical shape, but with axial symmetry) for which Aage Bohr, Ben Roy Mottelson, and James Rainwater won the 1975 Nobel Prize.

Also in 1955 (the journal Physical Review) and in 1957 (the journal "Nuclear Physics") he discovered asymptotic selection rules for beta and gamma transitions between states of deformed nuclei. The so-called Alaga rules are in common use among specialists in nuclear structure, in comparing theoretical transition rates with measurements.

He was the editor of the scientific magazine Fizika from 1978 until he died in 1988.

He died in Zagreb in 1988. Today, a street in the Trnje city district of Zagreb bears his name.

== Awards ==
- Republička nagrada "Ruđer Bošković" (1968)
