= State Road 130 (Serbia) =

Road in Serbia

State Road 130
- Serbian: Državni put II reda 130; Serbian Cyrillic: Државни пут II реда 130
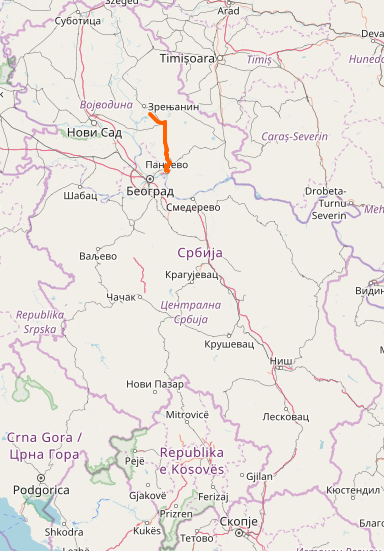

Route information
- Maintained by JP "Putevi Srbije"
- Length: 65.708 km (40.829 mi)

Major junctions
- From: 13 at Ečka
- To: 10 / E70 at Pančevo

Location
- Country: Serbia
- Districts: Central Banat, South Banat

Highway system
- Roads in Serbia; Motorways
← 129	→ 131

State Road 130, is an IIA-class road in northern Serbia, connecting Ečka with Pančevo. It is located in Vojvodina.

Before the new road categorization regulation given in 2013, the route wore the following names: M 24 (before 2012) / 111 (after 2012).

The existing route is a regional road with two traffic lanes. By the valid Space Plan of Republic of Serbia the road is not planned for upgrading to main road, and is expected to be conditioned in its current state.

== Sections ==
Section number	Length	Distance	Section name
13001	34.074 km (21.173 mi)	34.074 km (21.173 mi)	Ečka – Kovačica (JNA)
13002	25.543 km (15.872 mi)	59.617 km (37.044 mi)	Kovačica (JNA) – Jabučki Rit
13003	6.091 km (3.785 mi)	65.708 km (40.829 mi)	Jabučki Rit – Pančevo (Kovačica)

== See also ==
- Roads in Serbia
