= Srpski Miletić =

Srpski Miletić Српски Милетић (Serbian)
- Village (Selo)
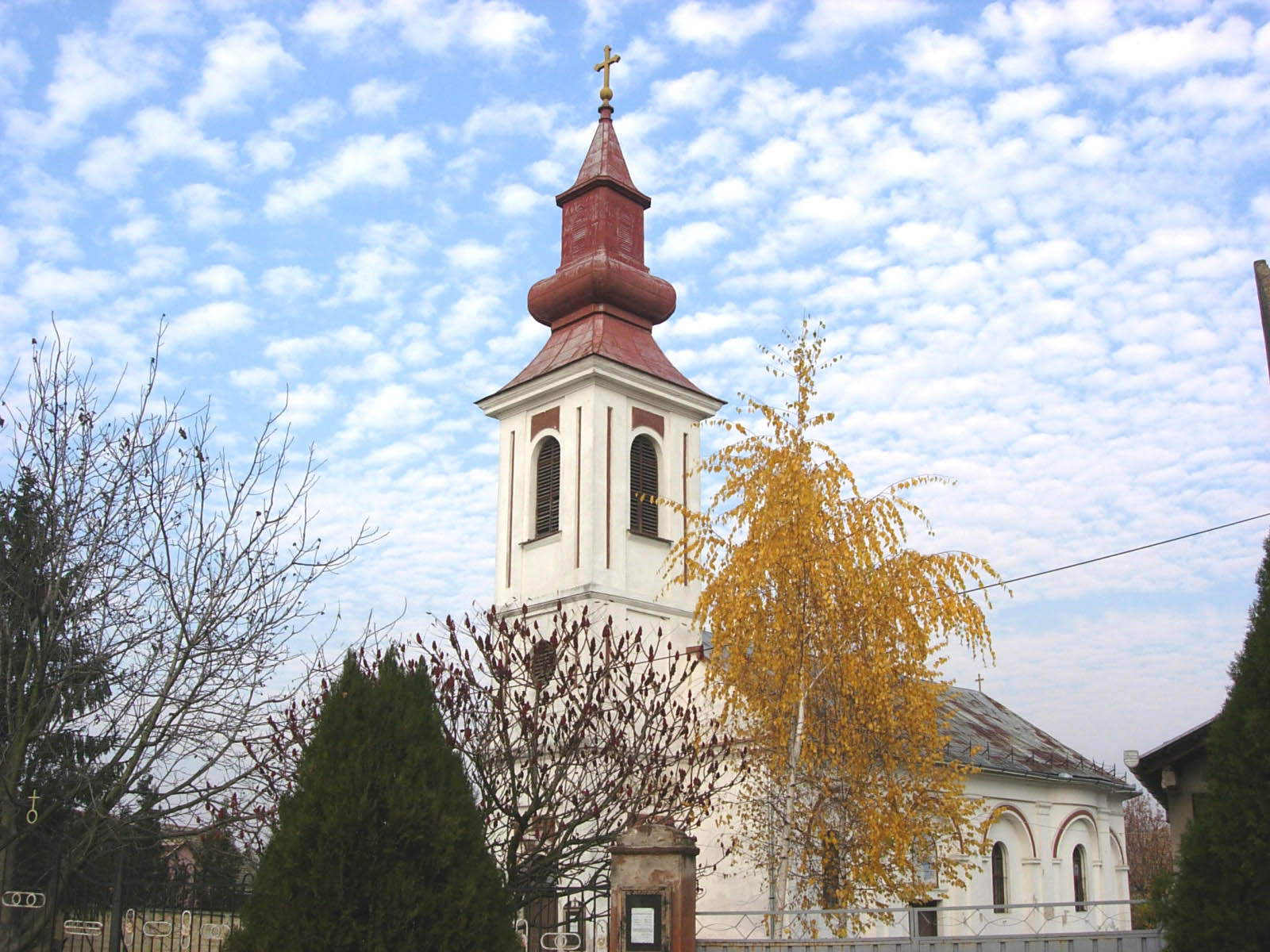
- The Orthodox church.

- Location within Vojvodina Location within Serbia Location within Europe
- Coordinates: 45°34′N 19°12′E
- Country: Serbia
- Province: Vojvodina
- Region: Bačka
- District: West Bačka
- Municipality: Odžaci
- Elevation: 300 ft (90 m)

Population (2011)
  - Total: 3,038
- Time zone: UTC+1 (CET)
  - Summer (DST): UTC+2 (CEST)

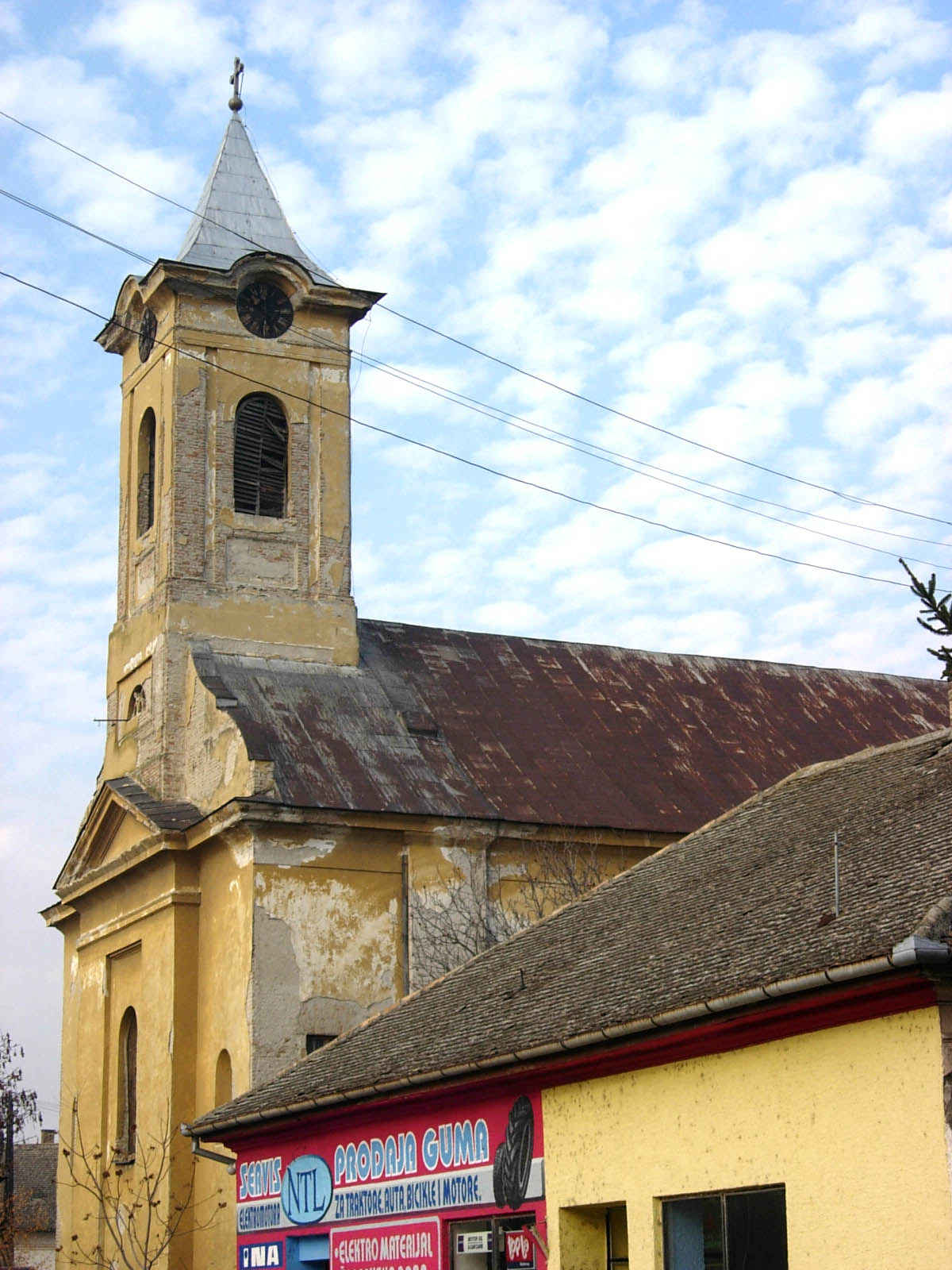
Raising of the Holy Cross Catholic Church.

Srpski Miletić (Serbian Cyrillic: Српски Милетић) is a village located in the Odžaci municipality, West Bačka District, Vojvodina, Serbia. As of 2011, the village has 3,038 people inhabitants.

== Name ==
In Serbian the village is known as Srpski Miletić (Српски Милетић), in Croatian as Srpski Miletić, in Hungarian as Rácmilitics, and in German as Berauersheim.

== Demographics ==
Historical population
Year	Pop.	±% p.a.
1948	4,089	—
1953	4,000	−0.44%
1961	4,453	+1.35%
1971	3,839	−1.47%
1981	3,764	−0.20%
1991	3,663	−0.27%
2002	3,538	−0.32%
2011	3,038	−1.68%

According to the last official census done in 2011, the village of Srpski Miletić has 3,038 inhabitants.

== See also ==
- List of places in Serbia
- List of cities, towns and villages in Vojvodina
- Oficijalne novine Novosti Srpski Miletic
