= State Road 131 (Serbia) =

Road in Serbia

State Road 131
- Serbian: Državni put II reda 131; Serbian Cyrillic: Државни пут II реда 131
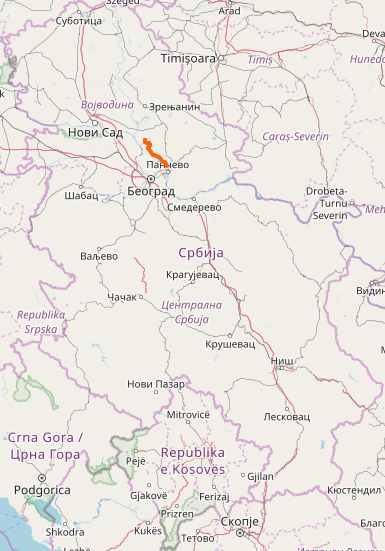

Route information
- Maintained by JP "Putevi Srbije"
- Length: 36.667 km (22.784 mi)

Major junctions
- From: Čenta
- To: Jabučki Rit

Location
- Country: Serbia
- Districts: South Banat

Highway system
- Roads in Serbia; Motorways
← 130	→ 132

State Road 131, is an IIA-class road in northern Serbia, connecting Čenta with Jabučki Rit. It is located in Vojvodina.

Before the new road categorization regulation was given in 2013, the route was known by the following name: P 124 (before 2012).

The existing route is a regional road with two traffic lanes. By the valid Space Plan of Republic of Serbia the road is not planned for upgrading to main road, and is expected to be conditioned in its current state.

== Sections ==
Section number	Length	Distance	Section name
13001	36.667 km (22.784 mi)	36.667 km (22.784 mi)	Čenta – Jabučki Rit

== See also ==
- Roads in Serbia
