= State Road 11 (Serbia) =

Road in Serbia

State Road 11
- Serbian: Državni put IB reda 11; Serbian Cyrillic: Државни пут IБ реда 11

Route information
- Maintained by JP "Putevi Srbije"
- Length: 23.677 km (14.712 mi)

Major junctions
- From: Hungary – Serbia border at Kelebija 53
- 12 near Subotica; 100 near Subotica
- To: A1 / E75 at Subotica

Location
- Country: Serbia
- Districts: North Bačka

Highway system
- Roads in Serbia; Motorways
← 10	→ 12

State Road 11, is an IB-class road in northern Serbia, connecting Hungary at Kelebija with Subotica. It is located in Vojvodina.

The route is an expressway with two lanes (one in each direction). Construction of the road finished in 2022 and is in operation in full length from the connection with A1 to the Kelebija border crossing. According to the Space Plan of Republic of Serbia, there are no plans to upgrade the road to a four-lane motorway.

== Sections ==
Section number	Length	Distance	Section name
01101	13.200 km (8.202 mi)	13.200 km (8.202 mi)	Hungary – Serbia border (Kelebija) – Subotica (Sombor)
01102	4.920 km (3.057 mi)	18.120 km (11.259 mi)	Subotica (Sombor) – Subotica (Bačka Topola)
01103	5.940 km (3.691 mi)	24.060 km (14.950 mi)	Subotica (Bačka Topola) – Subotica-south interchange

== See also ==
- Roads in Serbia
