= State Road 119 (Serbia) =

Road in Serbia

State Road 119
- Serbian: Državni put II reda 119; Serbian Cyrillic: Државни пут II реда 119
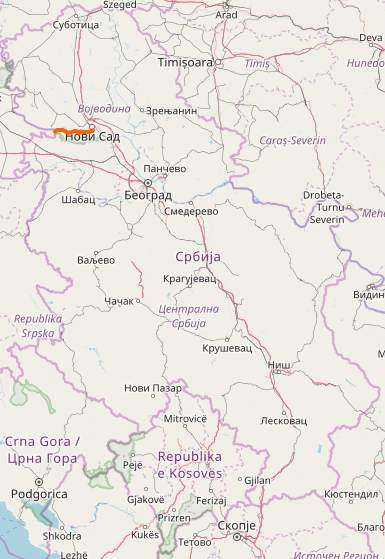

Route information
- Maintained by JP "Putevi Srbije"
- Length: 38.985 km (24.224 mi)

Major junctions
- From: Croatia – Serbia border at Neštin, Road 46039
- To: Sremska Kamenica

Location
- Country: Serbia
- Districts: South Bačka

Highway system
- Roads in Serbia; Motorways
← 118	→ 120

State Road 119, is an IIA-class road in northern Serbia, connecting Croatia at Neštin with Sremska Kamenica. It is located in Vojvodina.

Before the new road categorization regulation given in 2013, the route wore the following names: P 107 (before 2012) / 116 (after 2012).

The existing route is a regional road with two traffic lanes. By the valid Space Plan of Republic of Serbia the road is not planned for upgrading to main road, and is expected to be conditioned in its current state.

== Sections ==
Section number	Length	Distance	Section name
11901	0.766 km (0.476 mi)	0.766 km (0.476 mi)	Croatia – Serbia border at Neštin – Neštin
11902	12.511 km (7.774 mi)	13.277 km (8.250 mi)	Neštin – Sviloš (Danube)
11903	17.929 km (11.141 mi)	31.206 km (19.391 mi)	Sviloš (Danube) – Rakovac
11904	7.779 km (4.834 mi)	38.985 km (24.224 mi)	Rakovac – Sremska Kamenica

== See also ==
- Roads in Serbia
