= Southern and Eastern Serbia =

Southern and Eastern Serbia Јужна и источна Србија
- Statistical region of Serbia
- Location of Southern and Eastern Serbia
- Country: Serbia
- Founded: 2010
- Largest city: Niš

Area
  - Total: 26,245 km^{2} (10,133 sq mi)
  - Rank: 2nd

Population
  - Total: 1,406,050
  - Rank: 4th
  - Density: 53.574/km^{2} (138.76/sq mi)

GDP
  - Total: RSD 1,077.359 billion €9.172 billion (2022)
  - Per capita: RSD 763,000 €6,496 (2022)
- HDI: 0.757 (2023) high · 4th in Serbia

The Southern and Eastern Serbia (Serbian: Јужна и источна Србија, romanized: Južna i istočna Srbija) is one of five statistical regions of Serbia. It is also a Level-2 statistical region according to the Nomenclature of Territorial Units for Statistics (NUTS).

== History ==
In 2009, the National Assembly adopted a law which divided Serbia into seven statistical regions. At first, it was decided that in the territory of current statistical region of Southern and Eastern Serbia there would be two statistical regions – Eastern Region (Serbian: Источни регион, romanized: Istočni region) and Southern Region (Serbian: Јужни регион, romanized: Južni region). However, in 2010, the law was changed, thus the Eastern and Southern regions were merged into a single statistical region named Southern and Eastern Serbia.

== Administrative districts ==
The statistical region of Southern and Eastern Serbia encompasses 9 administrative districts:

District	Area (km^{2})	Population (2022)	Seat
Podunavlje	1,250	175,573	Smederevo
Braničevo	3,865	156,367	Požarevac
Bor	3,510	101,100	Bor
Zaječar	3,623	96,715	Zaječar
Nišava	2,727	343,950	Niš
Pirot	2,761	76,700	Pirot
Toplica	2,229	77,341	Prokuplje
Jablanica	2,770	184,502	Leskovac
Pčinja	3,520	193,802	Vranje

== Demographics ==
The region is heavily affected by depopulation. Most critical situation is in municipalities of Gadžin Han, Crna Trava, Ražanj, Trgovište, Dimitrovgrad, and Bosilegrad. A stark example of depopulation is Crna Trava, which used to have 13,614 inhabitants in 1948, while in 2022 only 1,063 people were registered.

=== Cities and towns ===
The following list include cities and towns with over 20,000 inhabitants.

City or town	Population (2022)
Niš	182,797
Smederevo	59,261
Leskovac	58,338
Vranje	50,954
Požarevac	42,530
Pirot	34,942
Zaječar	32,448
Bor	28,822
Prokuplje	24,627
Smederevska Palanka	20,345

=== Ethnic structure ===
Ethnicity	Population (2022)	Share
Serbs	1,173,092	83.4%
Albanians	58,145	4.1%
Roma	50,671	3.6%
Vlachs	19,569	1.4%
Bulgarians	10,554	0.7%
Undeclared	20,495	1.4%
Unknown	59,725	4.2%

== See also ==
- Statistical regions of Serbia
- Šumadija and Western Serbia
