= State Road 118 (Serbia) =

Road in Serbia

State Road 118
- Serbian: Državni put II reda 118; Serbian Cyrillic: Државни пут II реда 118
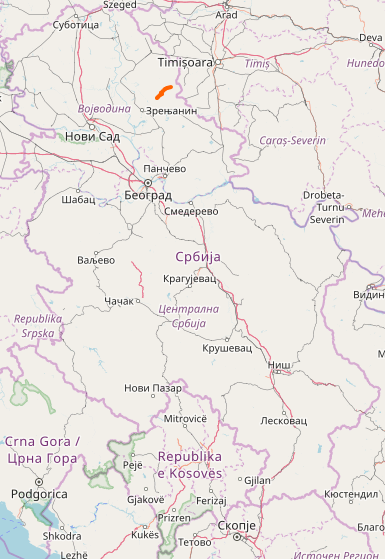

Route information
- Maintained by JP "Putevi Srbije"
- Length: 18.387 km (11.425 mi)

Major junctions
- From: Žitište
- To: Srpski Itebej

Location
- Country: Serbia
- Districts: Central Banat

Highway system
- Roads in Serbia; Motorways
← 117	→ 119

State Road 118, is an IIA-class road in northern Serbia, connecting Žitište with Srpski Itebej. It is located in Vojvodina.

Before the new road categorization regulation given in 2013, the route wore the following names: P 123.1 and P 123 (before 2012) / 113 and 109 (after 2012).

The existing route is a regional road with two traffic lanes. By the valid Space Plan of Republic of Serbia the road is not planned for upgrading to main road, and is expected to be conditioned in its current state.

== Sections ==
Section number	Length	Distance	Section name
11801	6.132 km (3.810 mi)	6.132 km (3.810 mi)	Žitište – Torak
11802	12.255 km (7.615 mi)	18.387 km (11.425 mi)	Torak – Srpski Itebej

== See also ==
- Roads in Serbia
