= Šumadija and Western Serbia =

Statistical region of Serbia

Šumadija and Western Serbia Шумадија и западна Србија
- Statistical region of Serbia
- Location of Šumadija and Western Serbia (yellow green)
- Country: Serbia
- Founded: 2010
- Largest city: Kragujevac

Area
  - Total: 26,493 km^{2} (10,229 sq mi)
  - Rank: 1st

Population
  - Total: 1,819,318
  - Rank: 1st
  - Density: 68.672/km^{2} (177.86/sq mi)

GDP
  - Total: RSD 1,306.248 billion €11.121 billion (2022)
  - Per capita: RSD 716,000 €6,096 (2022)
- ISO 3166 code: RS-12
- HDI (2022): 0.765 high · 3rd in Serbia

The Šumadija and Western Serbia (Serbian: Шумадија и западна Србија, romanized: Šumadija i zapadna Srbija) is one of the five statistical regions of Serbia. It is also a Level-2 statistical region according to the Nomenclature of Territorial Units for Statistics (NUTS).

== History ==
In 2009, the National Assembly adopted a law in which Serbia was divided into seven statistical regions. According to the law, territory of present-day Šumadija and Western Serbia was divided into two statistical regions – Western Region (Serbian: Западни регион, romanized: Zapadni region) and Central Region (Serbian: Централни регион, romanized: Centralni region).

However, in 2010, the law was modified and Western and Central regions were merged into a single statistical region named Šumadija and Western Serbia.

== Administrative districts ==
The statistical region of Šumadija and Western Serbia encompasses the territories of 8 administrative districts:

District	Area (km^{2})	Population (2022)	Seat
Mačva	3,264	265,377	Šabac
Kolubara	2,474	154,497	Valjevo
Moravica	3,016	189,281	Čačak
Zlatibor	6,142	254,659	Užice
Šumadija	2,387	269,728	Kragujevac
Pomoravlje	2,614	182,047	Jagodina
Raška	3,922	296,532	Kraljevo
Rasina	2,664	207,197	Kruševac

== Demographics ==
=== Cities and towns ===
The following list include cities and towns with over 20,000 inhabitants.

City or town	Population (2022)
Kragujevac	146,315
Novi Pazar	71,462
Čačak	69,598
Kraljevo	57,432
Valjevo	56,059
Kruševac	53,746
Šabac	51,163
Užice	48,539
Jagodina	34,892
Gornji Milanovac	23,109
Aranđelovac	22,881
Paraćin	22,349

=== Ethnic structure ===
Ethnicity	Population (2022)	Share
Serbs	1,547,121	85%
Bosniaks	151,374	8.3%
Roma	17,167	0.9%
ethnic Muslims	7,559	0.4%
Undeclared	15,234	0.8%
Unknown	66,955	3.7%

== See also ==
- Southern and Eastern Serbia
- Statistical regions of Serbia
