= Čenta =

Čenta Чента
- Village (Selo)
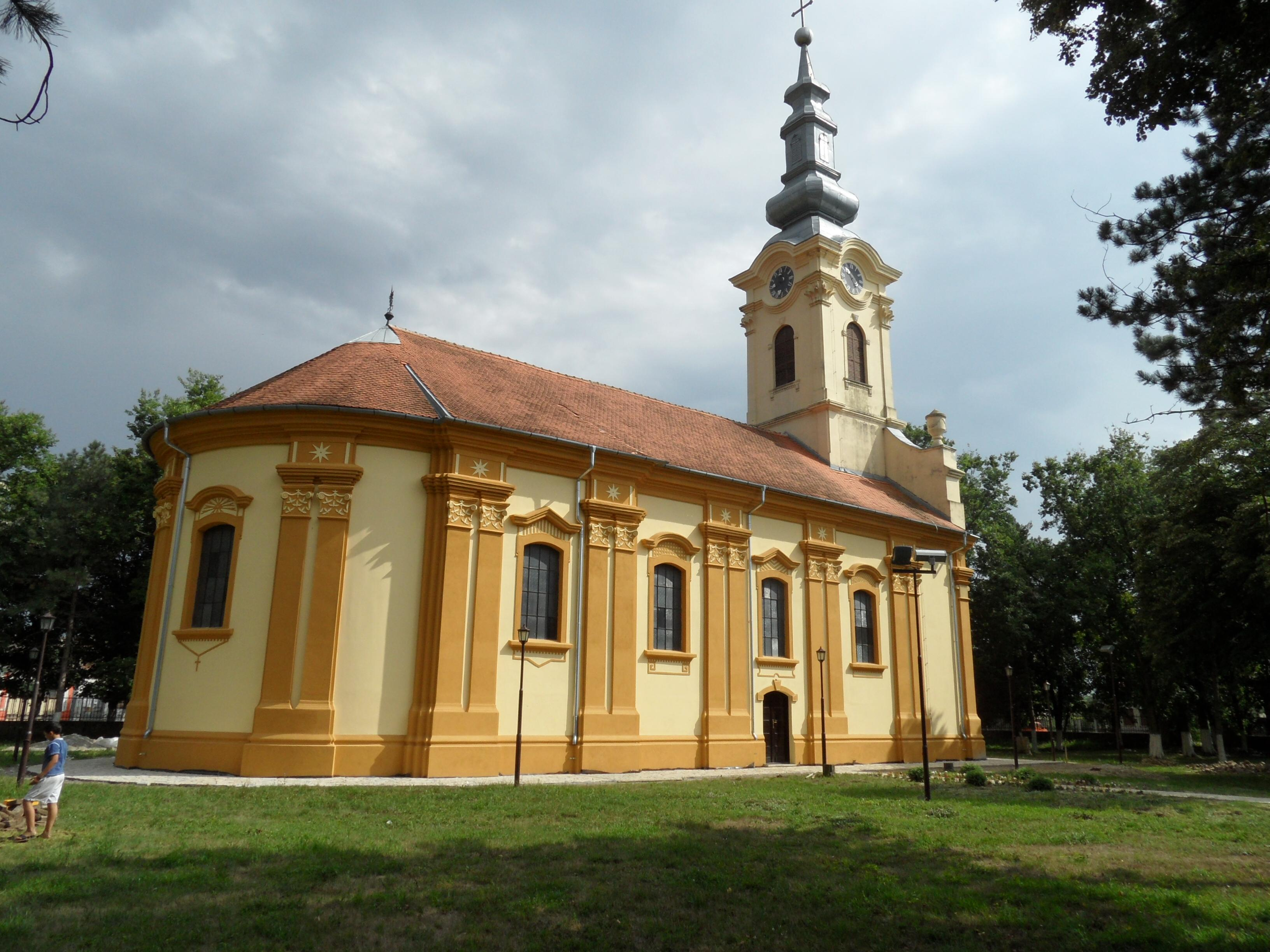
- The Orthodox church

- Location within Serbia Čenta (Serbia) Čenta (Europe)
- Coordinates: 45°06′18″N 20°23′10″E
- Country: Serbia
- Province: Vojvodina
- District: Central Banat
- Municipalities: Zrenjanin
- Elevation: 76 m (249 ft)

Population (2002)
  - Čenta: 3,119
- Time zone: UTC+1 (CET)
  - Summer (DST): UTC+2 (CEST)
- Postal code: 23266
- Area code: +381(0)23
- Car plates: ZR

Čenta (Serbian Cyrillic: Чента; Hungarian: Csenta) is a village located in the Zrenjanin municipality, in the Central Banat District of Serbia. It is situated in the Autonomous Province of Vojvodina. The village has a Serb ethnic majority (95.19%) and the population is 3,119 (2002 census).

== Name ==
In Serbian, the village is known as Čenta (Чента), in Hungarian as Csenta, and in German as Tschenta.

== Historical population ==
- 1961: 3,182
- 1971: 3,224
- 1981: 3,192
- 1991: 3,001
- 2002: 3,119

== See also ==
- List of places in Serbia
- List of cities, towns and villages in Vojvodina
