= State Road 129 (Serbia) =

Road in Serbia

State Road 129
- Serbian: Državni put II reda 129; Serbian Cyrillic: Државни пут II реда 129
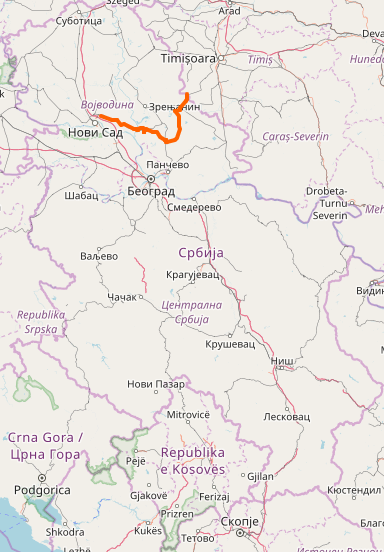

Route information
- Maintained by JP "Putevi Srbije"
- Length: 128.805 km (80.036 mi)

Major junctions
- From: Kać
- To: Serbia – Romania border at Jaša Tomić, Road DN59D

Location
- Country: Serbia
- Districts: South Bačka, Central Banat, South Banat

Highway system
- Roads in Serbia; Motorways
← 128	→ 130

State Road 129, is an IIA-class road in northern Serbia, connecting Kać with Romania at Jaša Tomić. It is located in Vojvodina.

Before the new road categorization regulation given in 2013, the route wore the following names: P 110, M 24.1, P 110.1, P 123, P 123.3, M 7.1, O 7 and P 123.2 (before 2012) / 110, 11 and 20 (after 2012).

The existing route is a regional road with two traffic lanes. By the valid Space Plan of Republic of Serbia the road is not planned for upgrading to main road, and is expected to be conditioned in its current state.

== Sections ==
Section number	Length	Distance	Section name
12901	15.027 km (9.337 mi)	15.027 km (9.337 mi)	Kać – Šajkaš
12902	31.813 km (19.768 mi)	46.840 km (29.105 mi)	Šajkaš – Perlez (Titel)
01314	2.487 km (1.545 mi)	49.327 km (30.650 mi)	Perlez (Titel) – Perlez (Kovačica) (overlap with)
12903	21.349 km (13.266 mi)	70.676 km (43.916 mi)	Perlez (Kovačica) – Kovačica (JNA)
12904	9.641 km (5.991 mi)	80.317 km (49.907 mi)	Kovačica (JNA) – Padina (centre)
12905	14.007 km (8.704 mi)	94.324 km (58.610 mi)	Padina (centre) – Samoš
12906	13.928 km (8.654 mi)	108.252 km (67.265 mi)	Samoš – Neuzina (Sečanj)
12907	4.571 km (2.840 mi)	112.823 km (70.105 mi)	Neuzina (Sečanj) – Sečanj (Neuzina)
01803	1.374 km (0.854 mi)	114.197 km (70.959 mi)	Sečanj (Neuzina) – Sečanj (Jaša Tomić) (overlap with)
12908	11.908 km (7.399 mi)	126.105 km (78.358 mi)	Sečanj (Jaša Tomić) – Jaša Tomić
12909	2.700 km (1.678 mi)	128.805 km (80.036 mi)	Jaša Tomić – Serbia – Romania border at Jaša Tomić

== See also ==
- Roads in Serbia
