= Bački Vinogradi =

Bački Vinogradi Бачки Виногради (Serbian) Királyhalom (Hungarian) Kraljev Brig
- Village (Selo)
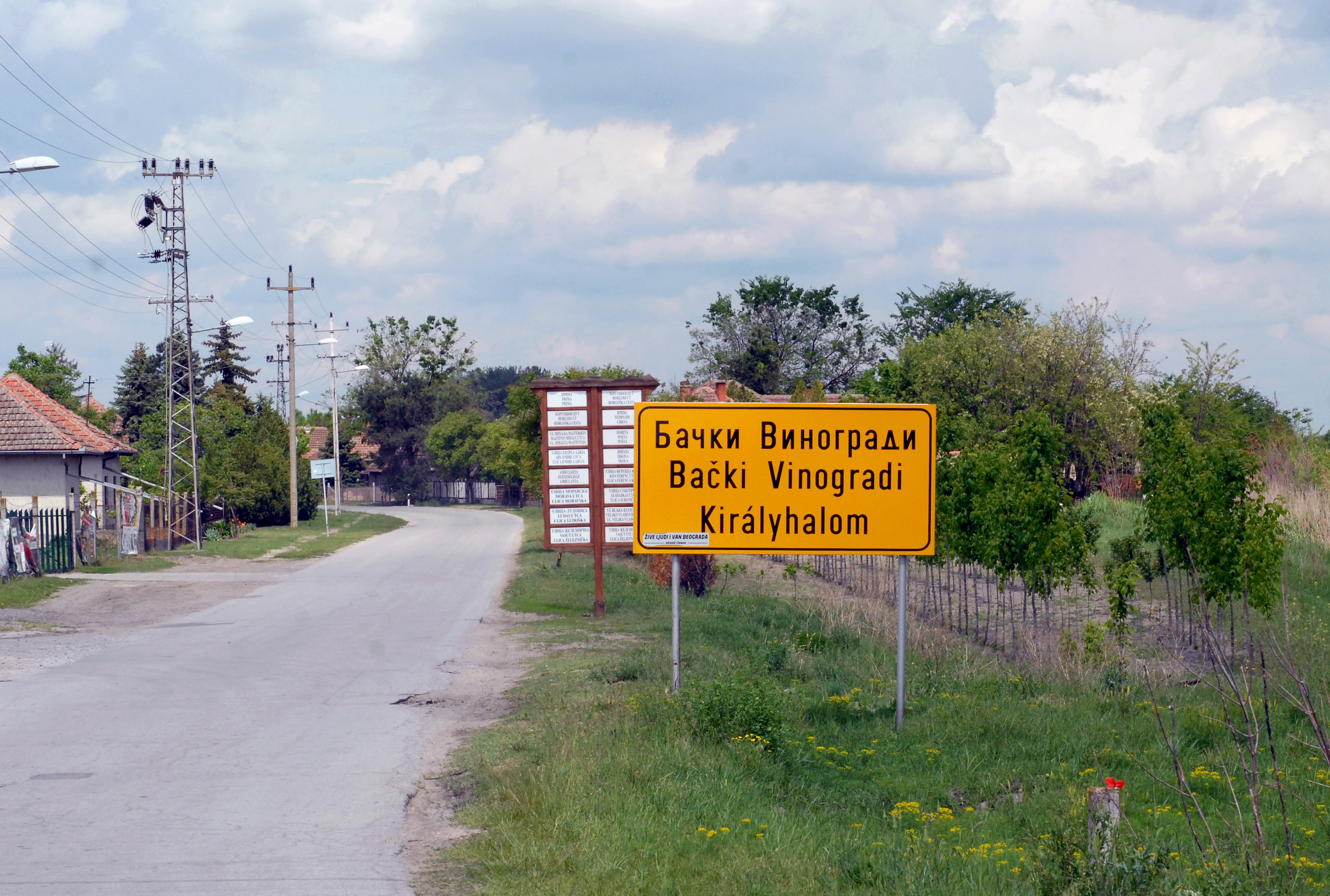

- Location within Vojvodina Location within Serbia Location within Europe
- Coordinates: 46°08′N 19°52′E
- Country: Serbia
- Province: Vojvodina

Population (2002)
  - Total: 2,039
- Time zone: UTC+1 (CET)
  - Summer (DST): UTC+2 (CEST)

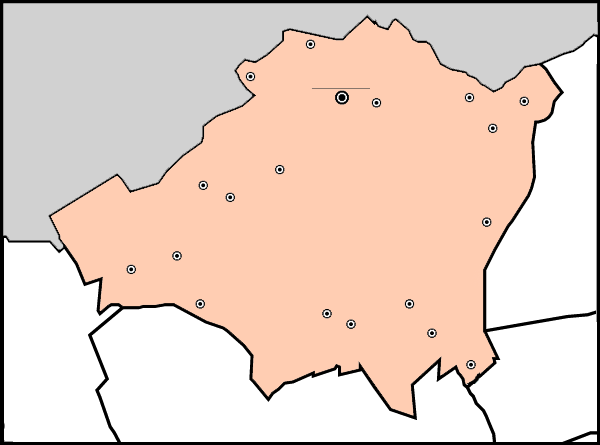

Bački Vinogradi (Serbian Cyrillic: Бачки Виногради; Hungarian: Királyhalom or Bácsszőlős) is a village located in the administrative area of the City of Subotica, in the North Bačka District, Vojvodina, Serbia. The village has a population of 1,448 people (2022 census).

== Demographics ==
=== Historical population ===
- 1961: 3,590
- 1971: 3,744
- 1981: 2,345
- 1991: 2,242
- 2002: 2,039
- 2011: 1,922
- 2022: 1,448

=== Ethnic groups ===
According to data from the 2022 census, ethnic groups in the village include:

- 1,315 (90.8%) Hungarians
- 37 (2.5%) Serbs
- Others/Undeclared/Unknown

== See also ==
- List of places in Serbia
- List of cities, towns and villages in Vojvodina
