= Svetozar Miletić (village) =

Svetozar Miletić Светозар Милетић (Serbian) Nemesmilitics (Hungarian) Lemeš (Croatian)
- Village (Selo)
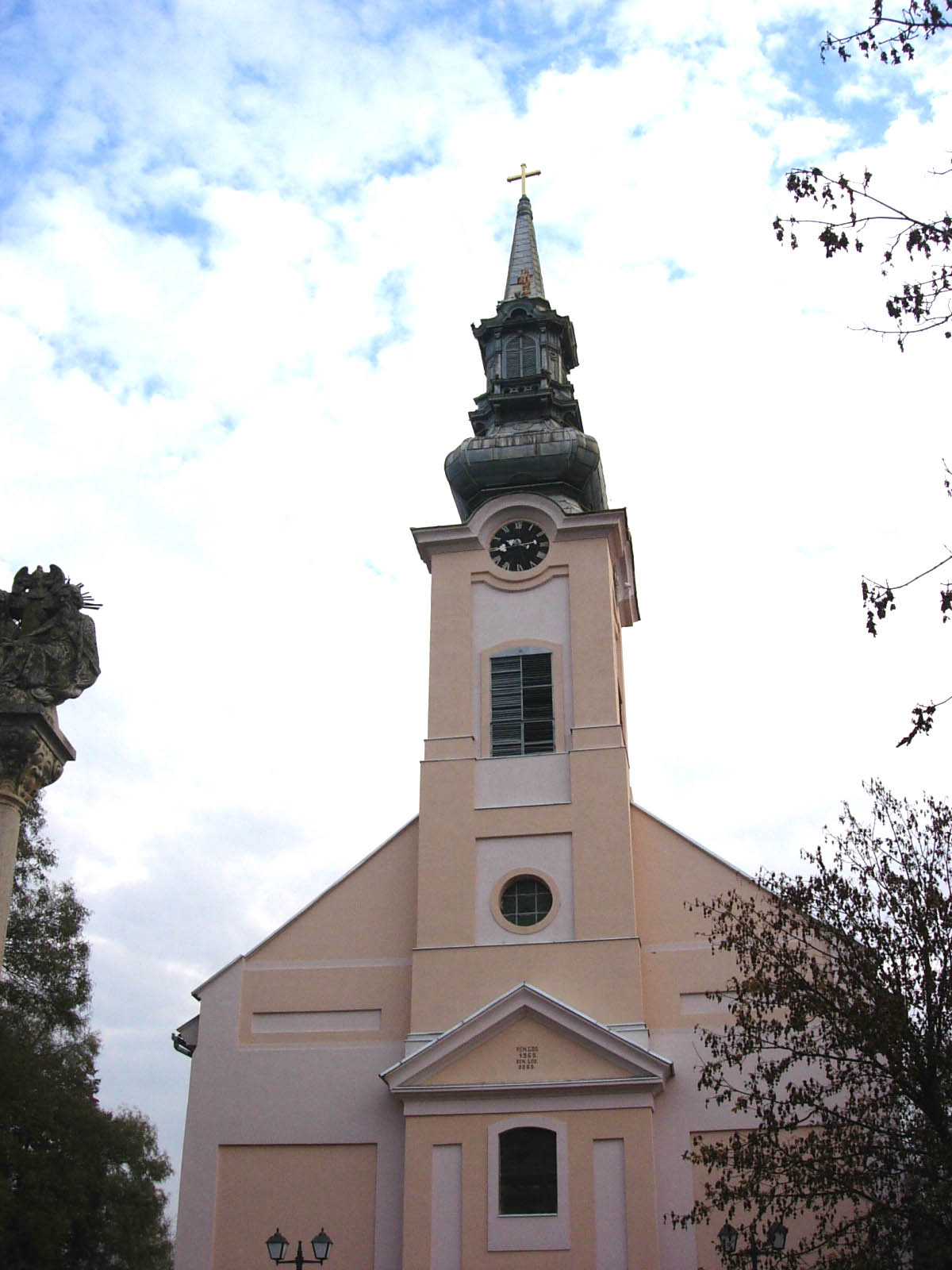
- The Birth of Blessed Virgin Mary Catholic Church.

- Location within Vojvodina Location within Serbia Location within Europe
- Coordinates: 45°51′01″N 19°12′24″E
- Country: Serbia
- Province: Vojvodina
- Region: Bačka
- District: West Bačka
- Municipality: Sombor

Population (2011)
  - Total: 2,746
- Time zone: UTC+1 (CET)
  - Summer (DST): UTC+2 (CEST)
- Postal code: 25211
- Area code: +381 25
- Vehicle registration: SO

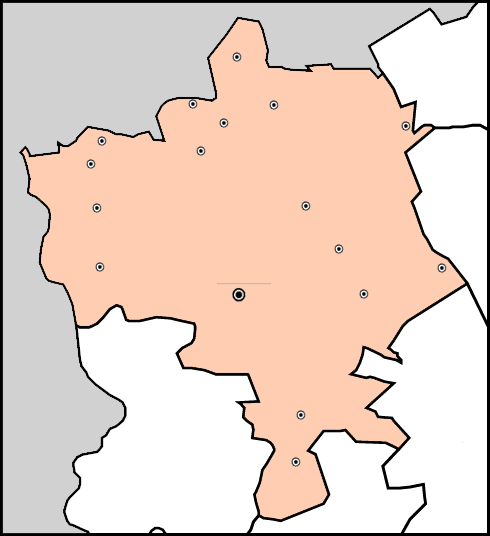

Svetozar Miletić (Serbian Cyrillic: Светозар Милетић, Hungarian: Nemesmilitics, Croatian: Lemeš / Svetozar Miletić, German: Milititsch) is a village located in Sombor municipality in the West Bačka District of Vojvodina, Serbia. It is situated in Bačka geographical region. The village is ethnically mixed between Hungarians and Serbs and its population numbering 2,746 inhabitants.

== Name ==
The village was named after Svetozar Miletić, a political leader of Serbs in Vojvodina from second half of 19th century.

In Serbian, the village is known as Svetozar Miletić (Светозар Милетић), in Croatian as Lemeš (since 2009) or Svetozar Miletić (before 2009), in Bunjevac as Svetozar Miletić or Lemeš, in German as Milititsch, and in Hungarian as Nemesmillitics. Before 1925, in Serbian, Croatian and Bunjevac the name Lemeš (Лемеш) was used for the village.

The origin of the village name in Hungarian comes from the Hungarian word nemes (a noble), while for the word militics it is believed that it comes from Latin militis (a soldier). Local Bunjevci people have shortened and transformed the name Nemesmilitics into Lemeš. During the administration of the Kingdom of Serbs, Croats and Slovenes the village name was changed into Svetozar Miletić (in 1925).

== Demographics ==
Historical population
Year	Pop.	±% p.a.
1948	4,105	—
1953	4,036	−0.34%
1961	3,990	−0.14%
1971	3,860	−0.33%
1981	3,685	−0.46%
1991	3,292	−1.12%
2002	3,169	−0.35%
2011	2,746	−1.58%

According to the last official census done in 2011, the village of Svetozar Miletić has 2,746 inhabitants.

=== Ethnic groups ===
According to the 2002 census, ethnic groups in the village included:

- Hungarians = 1,455 (45.91%)
- Croats = 581 (18.33%) (*)
- Serbs = 549 (17.32%) (*)
- Bunjevci = 217 (6.85%) (*)
- Yugoslavs = 149 (4.70%) (*)
- others.

(*) Total number of South Slavs (Croats, Serbs, Bunjevci, Yugoslavs) that live in the village is 1,496 (47.21%).

== Famous persons ==
- Arányi Jenö (1883-1944), journalist, writer, author of books for children, novelist
- Gaja Alaga (1924–1988), theoretical physicist
- Stevan Horvat (1932–2018), Greco-Roman style wrestler, Olympics silver medalist in 1968
- Đuro Kanjurski (1853–1920), professor of Aramaic and Arabic at Royal University in Budapest
- Grgo Knezi (1892–1944), priest, biologist
- Petar Knezi (1859–1929), priest and writer
- Tereza Kočiš (1932), gymnast that participated on several Olympics
- Mirko Vidaković (1924–2002), botanist
- dr Pajo Vidaković (1879–1942), priest, ethnologist, author of textbooks, writer

== See also ==
- List of places in Serbia
- List of cities, towns and villages in Vojvodina
