= Bezdan =

Bezdan Бездан (Serbian) Bezdán (Hungarian)
- Village (Selo)
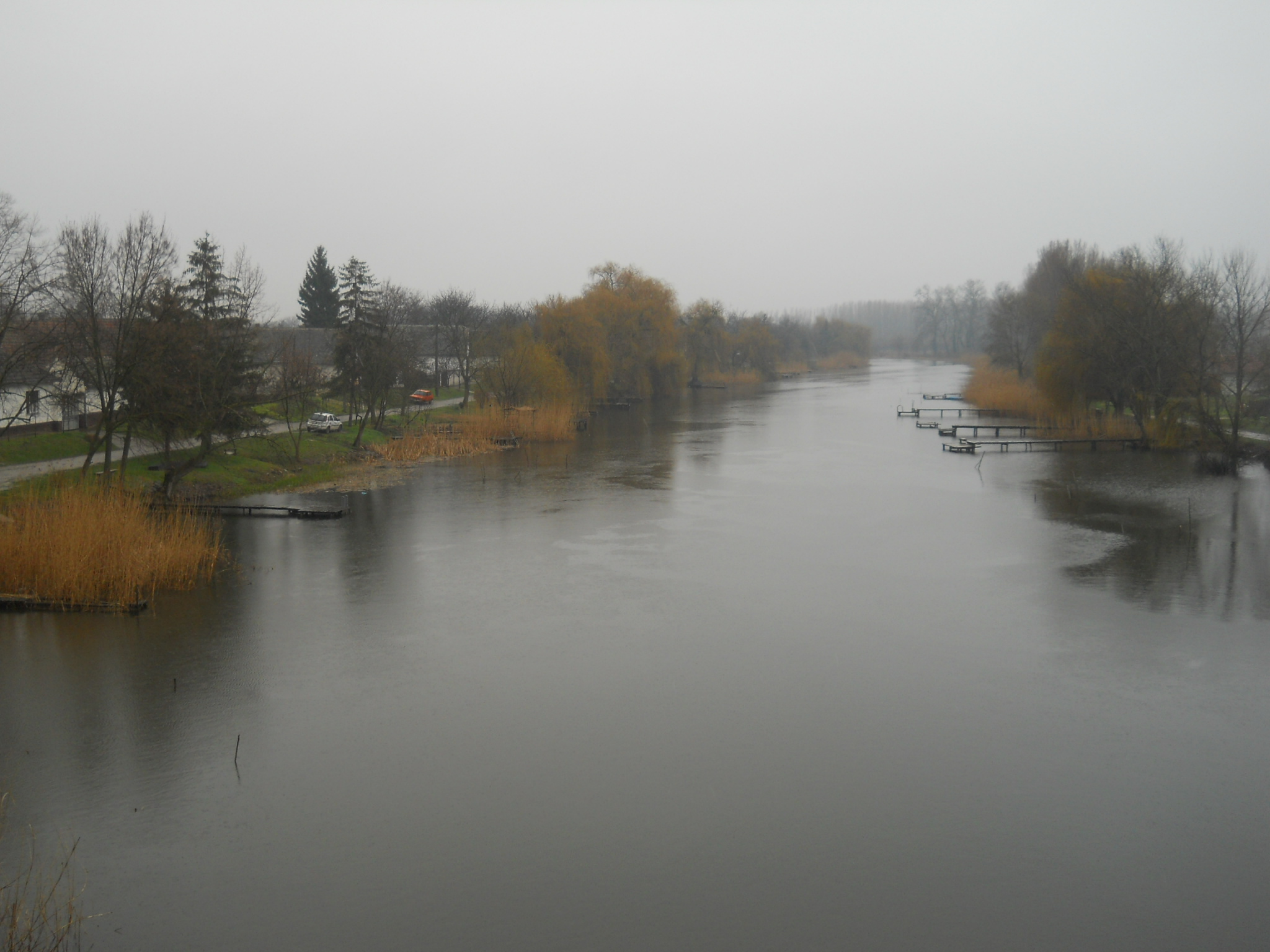
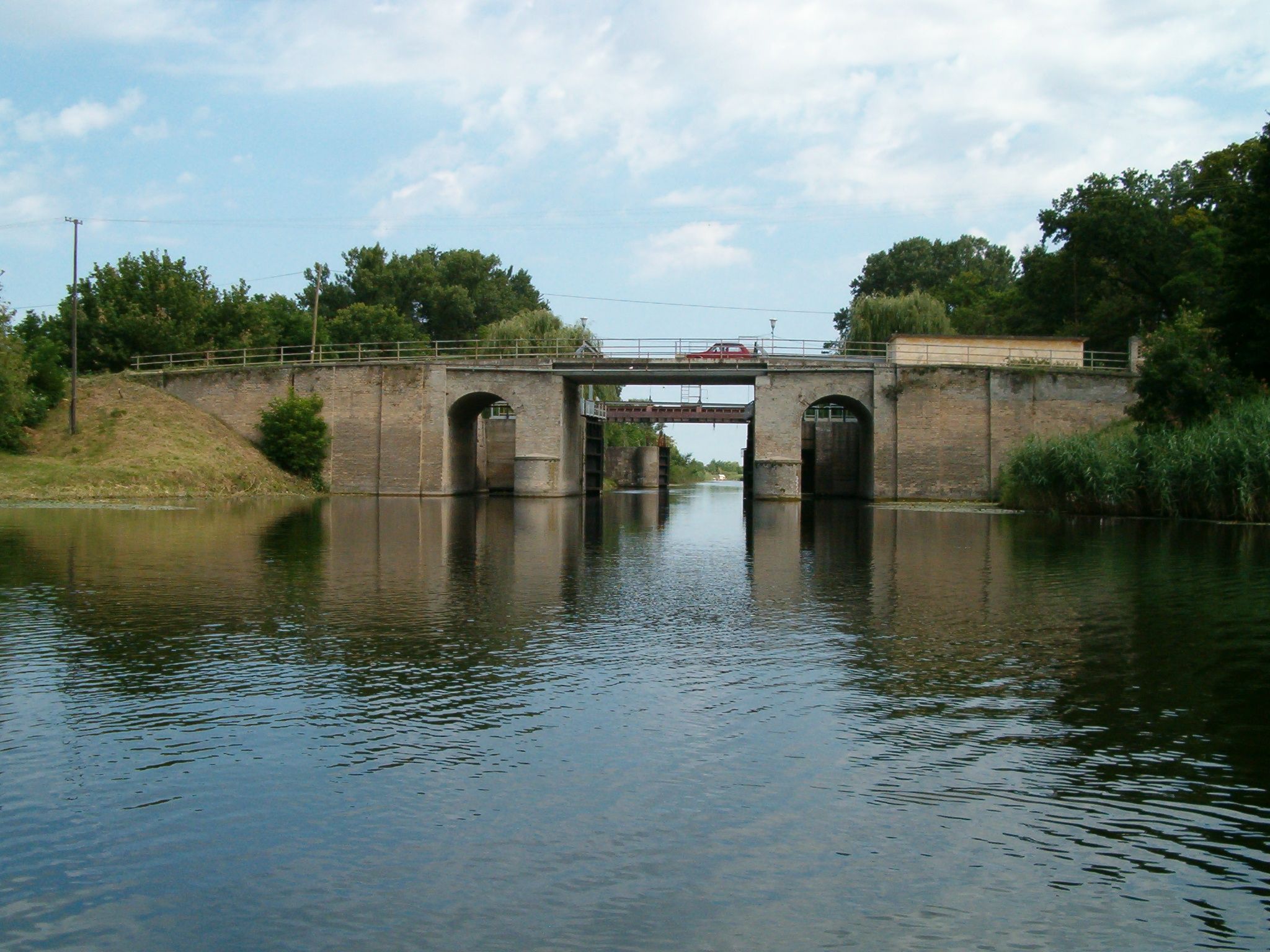
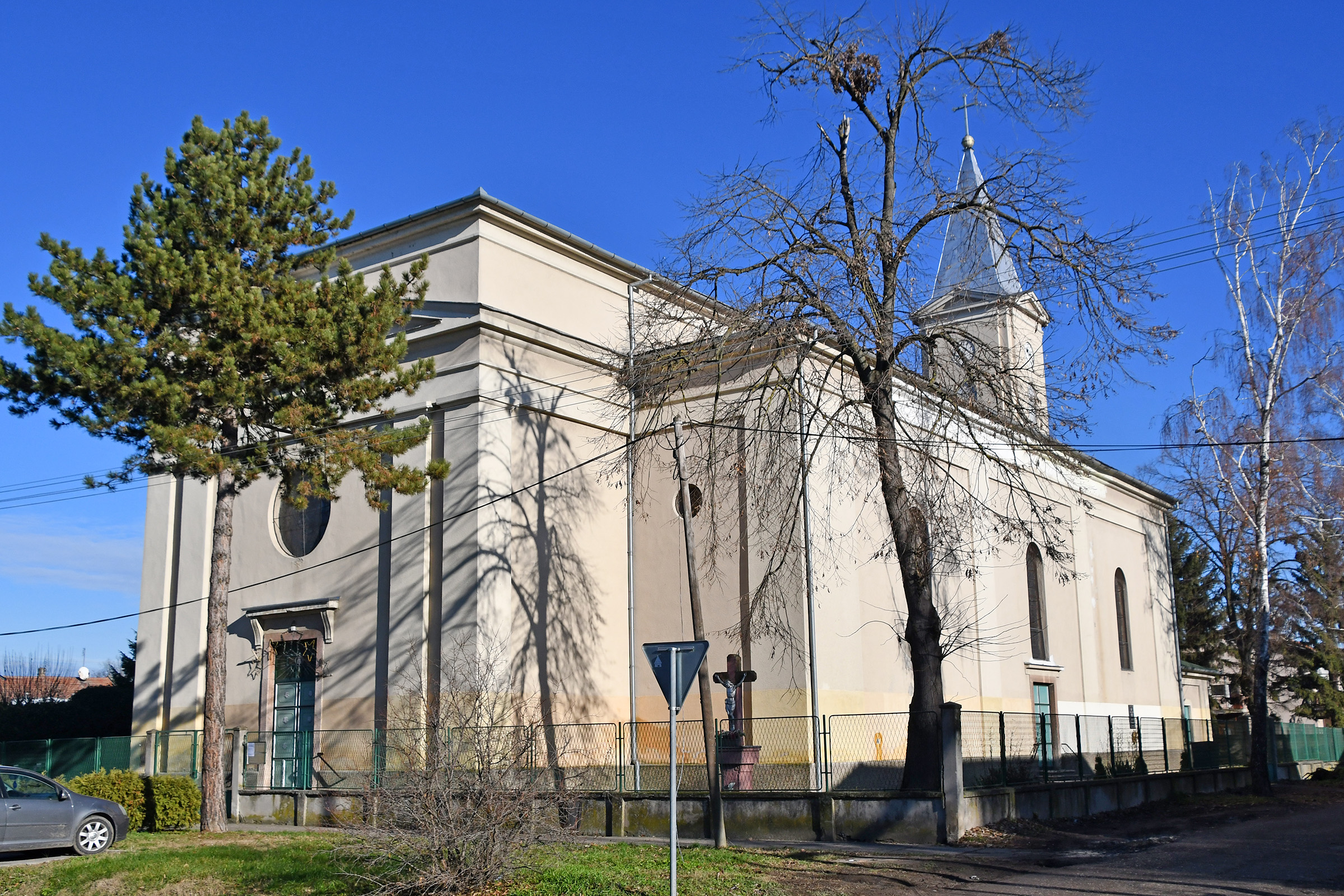
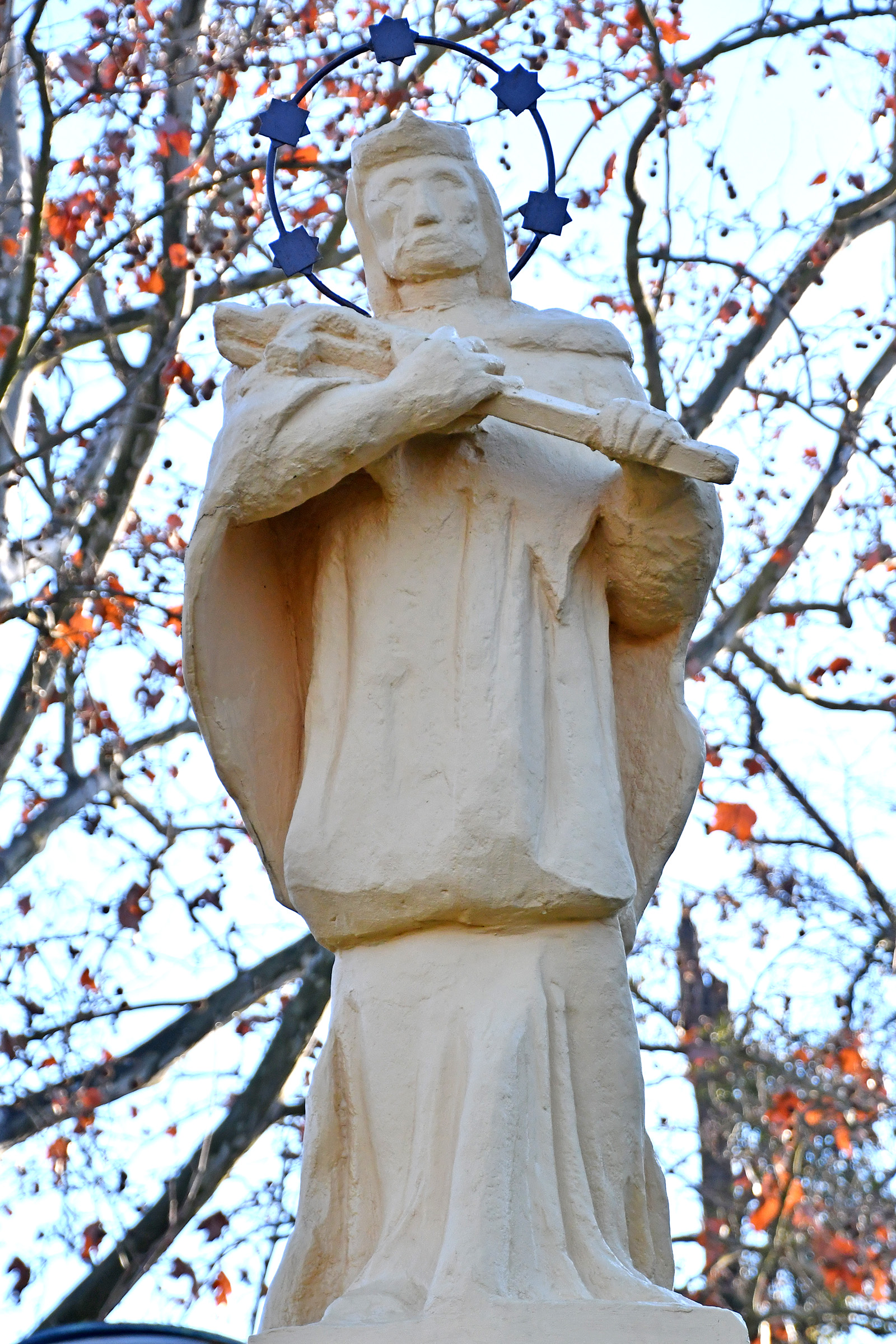
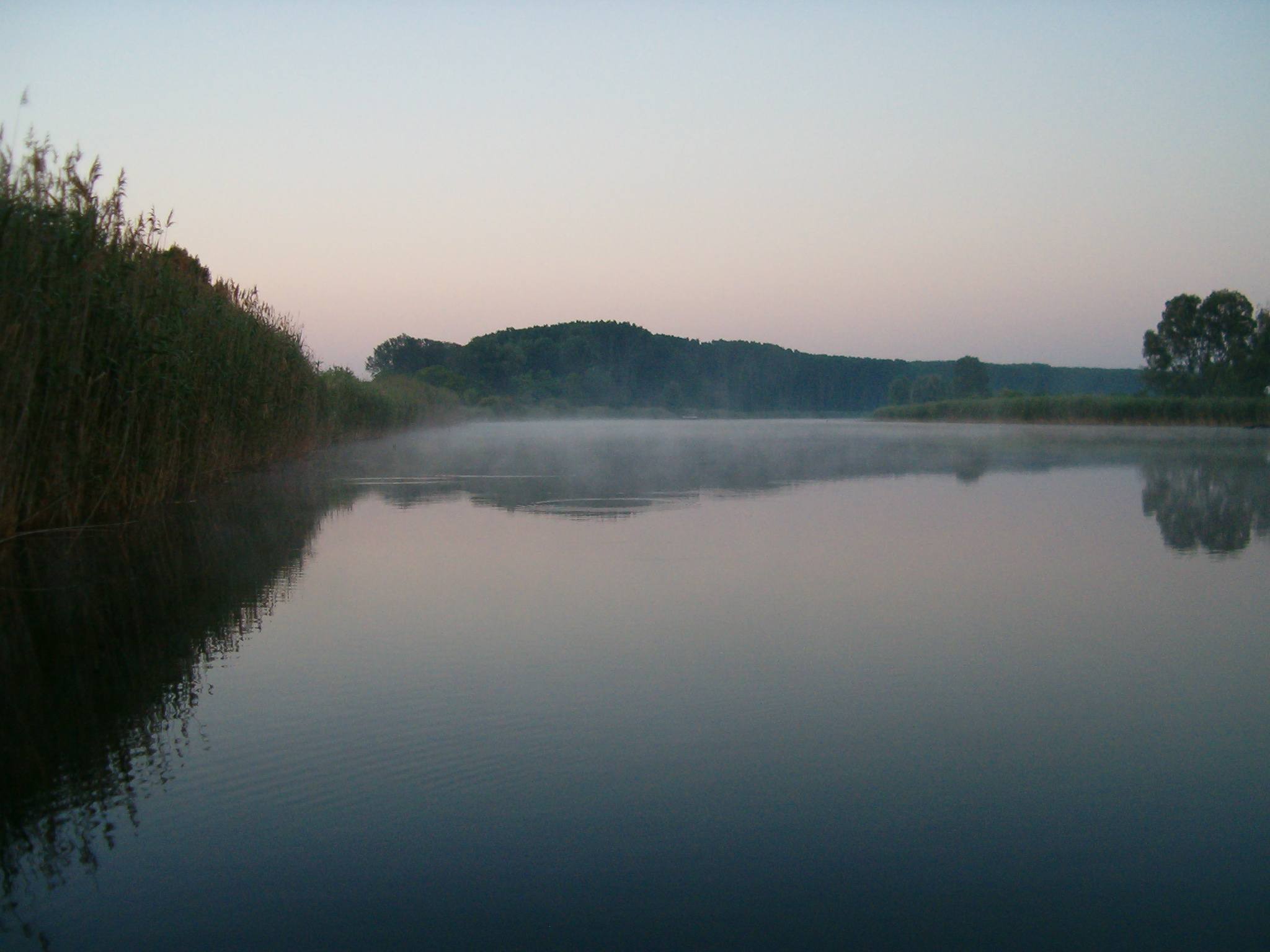
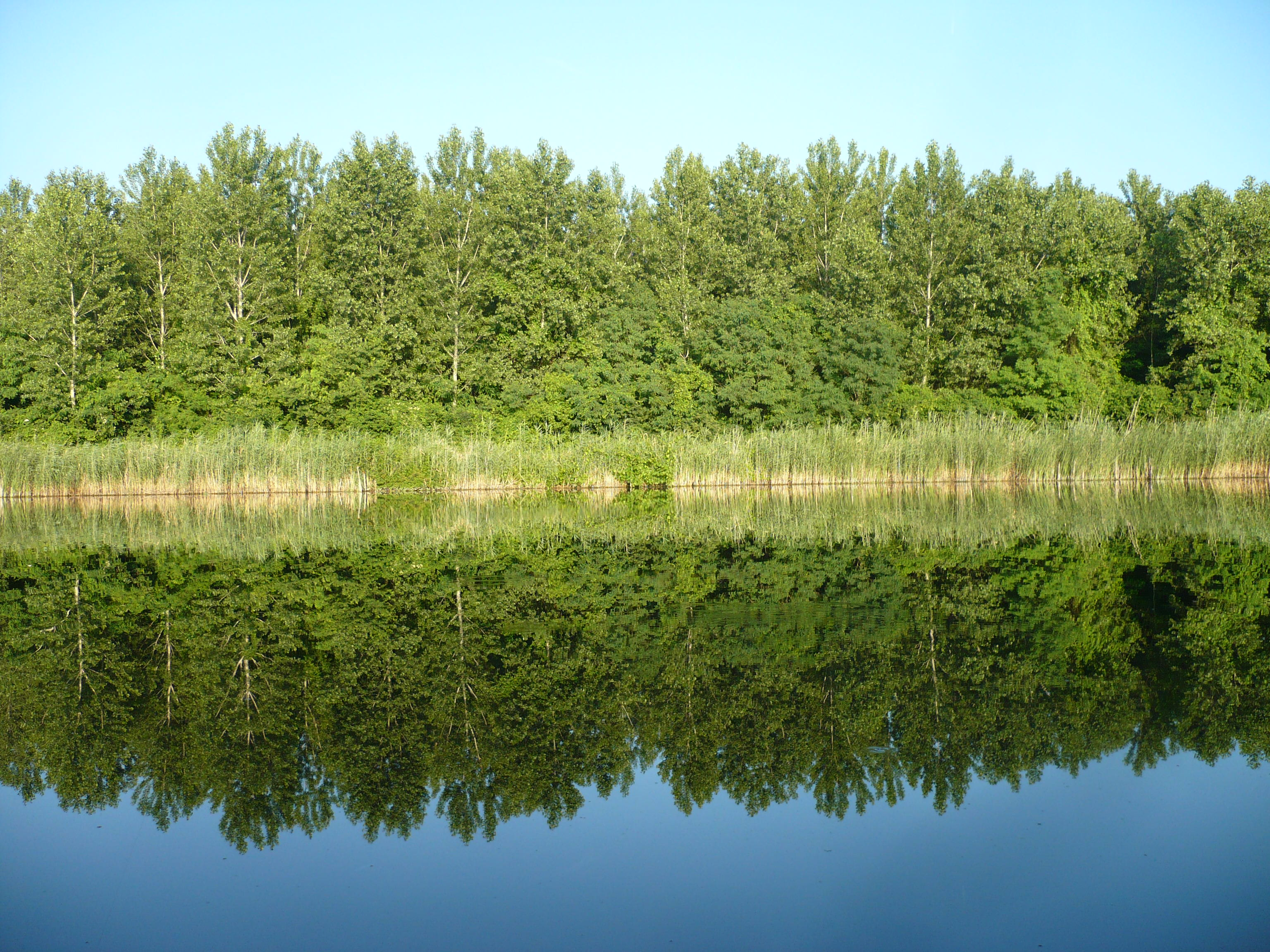
- Danube–Tisa–Danube Canal Canal bridge Roman Catholic Church John Nepomuk statue Danube–Tisa–Danube Canal Danube–Tisa–Danube Canal

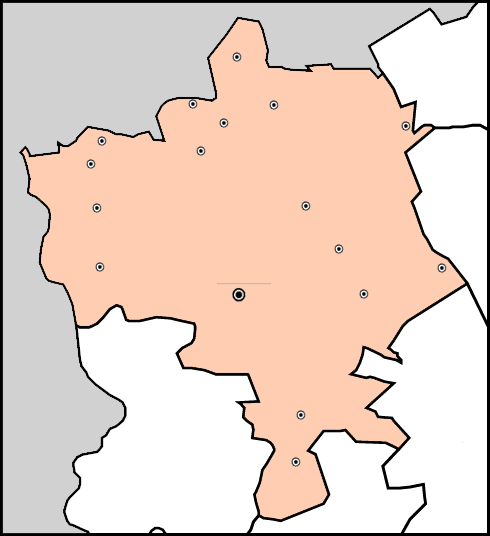

- Location within Vojvodina Location within Serbia Location within Europe
- Coordinates: 45°51′N 18°56′E
- Country: Serbia
- Province: Vojvodina
- Region: Bačka (Podunavlje)
- District: West Bačka
- Municipality: Sombor

Area
  - Total: 79.90 km^{2} (30.85 sq mi)
- Elevation: 98 m (322 ft)

Population (2011)
  - Total: 4,623
  - Density: 57.86/km^{2} (149.9/sq mi)
- Time zone: UTC+1 (CET)
  - Summer (DST): UTC+2 (CEST)
- Website: www.bezdan.info

Bezdan (Serbian Cyrillic: Бездан; Hungarian: Bezdán, Croatian: Bezdan, German: Besdan) is a village located in Bačka, Vojvodina, Serbia. It is situated in the Sombor municipality, West Bačka District. The village has a Hungarian ethnic majority and its population numbers at 5,263 people (2002 census).

== History ==
It was first mentioned in 1305 under the name of Battyan, while in 1341 it was mentioned as Betsan. The village was destroyed during an Ottoman invasion in the 16th century. With the establishment of Habsburg rule, the village was settled by Hungarians, Poles, Czechs and Germans. The first church in the village was built in 1755, and the current one was constructed in 1846.

== Demographics ==
=== Historical population ===
- 1961: 6,813
- 1971: 6,427
- 1981: 6,085
- 1991: 5,472
- 2002: 5,263
- 2011: 4,623

=== Ethnic groups ===
The ethnic groups in the village as of 2002 census:

- Hungarians = 2,983 (56.68%)
- Serbs = 1,256 (23.87%)
- Croats = 424 (8.06%)
- Yugoslavs = 141 (2.68%)
- others.

== See also ==
- List of places in Serbia
- List of cities, towns and villages in Vojvodina
