= State Road 100 (Serbia) =

Road in northern Serbia

State Road 100
- Serbian: Državni put II reda 100; Serbian Cyrillic: Државни пут II реда 100
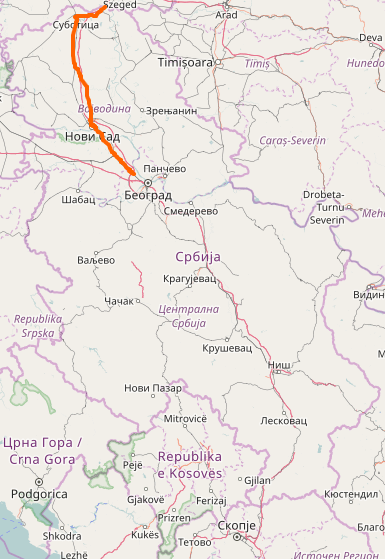

Route information
- Maintained by JP "Putevi Srbije"
- Length: 185.834 km (115.472 mi)

Major junctions
- From: Hungary – Serbia border at Horgoš
- To: Batajnica E75

Location
- Country: Serbia
- Districts: North Banat, North Bačka, South Bačka, Srem, City of Belgrade

Highway system
- Roads in Serbia; Motorways
← 259	→ 101

State Road 100, is an IIA-class road in northern Serbia, connecting Horgoš with Batajnica. It is located in Vojvodina and City of Belgrade.

Before the new road categorization regulation given in 2013, the route wore the following names: M 22.1, M 24 and P 120 (before 2012) / 102, 101 and 13 (after 2012).

The existing route is a regional road with two traffic lanes. By the valid Space Plan of Republic of Serbia the road is not planned for upgrading to main road, and is expected to be conditioned in its current state.

== Sections ==
Section number	Length	Distance	Section name
10001	4.679 km (2.907 mi)	4.679 km (2.907 mi)	Hungary – Serbia border (Horgoš 2) – Horgoš
01302	0.230 km (0.143 mi)	4.909 km (3.050 mi)	Horgoš – Horgoš (Kanjiža) (overlap with)
10002	10.439 km (6.486 mi)	15.348 km (9.537 mi)	Horgoš (Kanjiža) – Bački Vinogradi
10003	3.500 km (2.175 mi)	18.848 km (11.712 mi)	Bački Vinogradi – Subotica-north interchange
10004	11.614 km (7.217 mi)	30.462 km (18.928 mi)	Subotica-north interchange – Subotica (center)
10005	6.311 km (3.921 mi)	36.773 km (22.850 mi)	Subotica (center) – Subotica (Bačka Topola)
10006	10.255 km (6.372 mi)	47.028 km (29.222 mi)	Subotica (Bačka Topola) – Stari Žednik
10007	15.566 km (9.672 mi)	62.594 km (38.894 mi)	Stari Žednik – Bačka Topola (Bački Sokolac)
10008	0.752 km (0.467 mi)	63.346 km (39.361 mi)	Bačka Topola (Bački Sokolac) – Bačka Topola (Tornjoš) (overlap with)
10009	18.063 km (11.224 mi)	81.409 km (50.585 mi)	Bačka Topola (Tornjoš) – Feketić (Vrbas)
10010	2.170 km (1.348 mi)	83.579 km (51.934 mi)	Feketić (Vrbas) – Feketić interchange
10011	12.074 km (7.502 mi)	95.653 km (59.436 mi)	Feketić interchange – Srbobran (Feketić)
10012	1.120 km (0.696 mi)	96.773 km (60.132 mi)	Srbobran (Feketić) – Srbobran (Turija)
10013	12.120 km (7.531 mi)	108.893 km (67.663 mi)	Srbobran (Turija) – Sirig (Zmajevo)
10014	0.065 km (0.040 mi)	108.958 km (67.703 mi)	Sirig (Zmajevo) – Sirig (Temerin) (overlap with)
10015	14.237 km (8.846 mi)	123.195 km (76.550 mi)	Sirig (Temerin) – Novi Sad (Temerin)
10016	0.436 km (0.271 mi)	123.631 km (76.821 mi)	Novi Sad (Temerin) – Novi Sad-center interchange
10017	4.232 km (2.630 mi)	127.863 km (79.450 mi)	Novi Sad-center interchange – Novi Sad (Sirig)
02101	4.820 km (2.995 mi)	132.683 km (82.445 mi)	Novi Sad (Sirig) – Petrovaradin (Račkog) (overlap with)
10018	20.136 km (12.512 mi)	152.819 km (94.957 mi)	Petrovaradin (Račkog) – Maradik (Beška)
10019	2.316 km (1.439 mi)	155.135 km (96.396 mi)	Maradik (Beška) – Maradik
10020	5.590 km (3.473 mi)	160.725 km (99.870 mi)	Maradik – Inđija (Novi Karlovci)
10021	0.421 km (0.262 mi)	161.146 km (100.131 mi)	Inđija (Novi Karlovci) – Inđija (Putinci) (overlap with)
10022	9.606 km (5.969 mi)	170.752 km (106.100 mi)	Inđija (Putinci) – Stara Pazova (center)
10023	9.614 km (5.974 mi)	180.366 km (112.074 mi)	Stara Pazova (center) – Vojvodina border (Nova Pazova)
10024	3.177 km (1.974 mi)	183.543 km (114.048 mi)	Vojvodina border (Nova Pazova) – Batajnica
10025	2.291 km (1.424 mi)	185.834 km (115.472 mi)	Batajnica – Batajnica interchange
Additional section until the construction of crossing between Regional Roads 100 and 102 in Novi Sad
10000	5.064 km (3.147 mi)		Sentandreja road – Sentandreja road

== See also ==
- Roads in Serbia
