= State Road 117 (Serbia) =

Road in Serbia

State Road 117
- Serbian: Državni put II reda 117; Serbian Cyrillic: Државни пут II реда 117
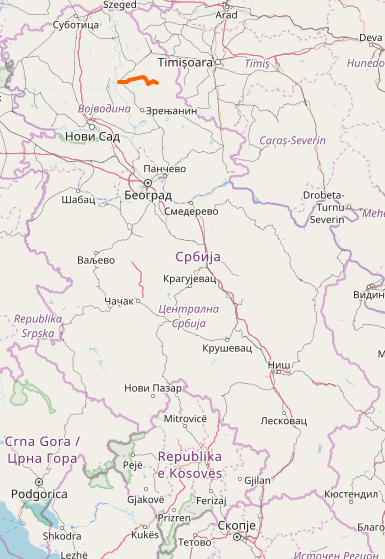

Route information
- Maintained by JP "Putevi Srbije"
- Length: 35.754 km (22.217 mi)

Major junctions
- From: Novi Bečej
- To: Banatsko Karađorđevo

Location
- Country: Serbia
- Districts: Central Banat, North Banat

Highway system
- Roads in Serbia; Motorways
← 116	→ 118

State Road 117, is an IIA-class road in northern Serbia, connecting Novi Bečej with Banatsko Karađorđevo. It is located in Vojvodina.

Before the new road categorization regulation given in 2013, the route wore the following names: P 114, O 4 (before 2012) / 19 (after 2012).

The existing route is a regional road with two traffic lanes. By the valid Space Plan of Republic of Serbia the road is not planned for upgrading to main road, and is expected to be conditioned in its current state.

== Sections ==
Section number	Length	Distance	Section name
11701	20.393 km (12.672 mi)	20.393 km (12.672 mi)	Novi Bečej (Bašaid) – Bašaid (Novi Bečej)
11702	2.014 km (1.251 mi)	22.407 km (13.923 mi)	Bašaid (Novi Bečej) – Bašaid (Torda)
11703	13.347 km (8.293 mi)	35.754 km (22.217 mi)	Bašaid (Torda) – Banatsko Karađorđevo

== See also ==
- Roads in Serbia
