= West Bačka District =

Administrative district of Serbia

West Bačka District Западнобачки округ
- Administrative district of Serbia
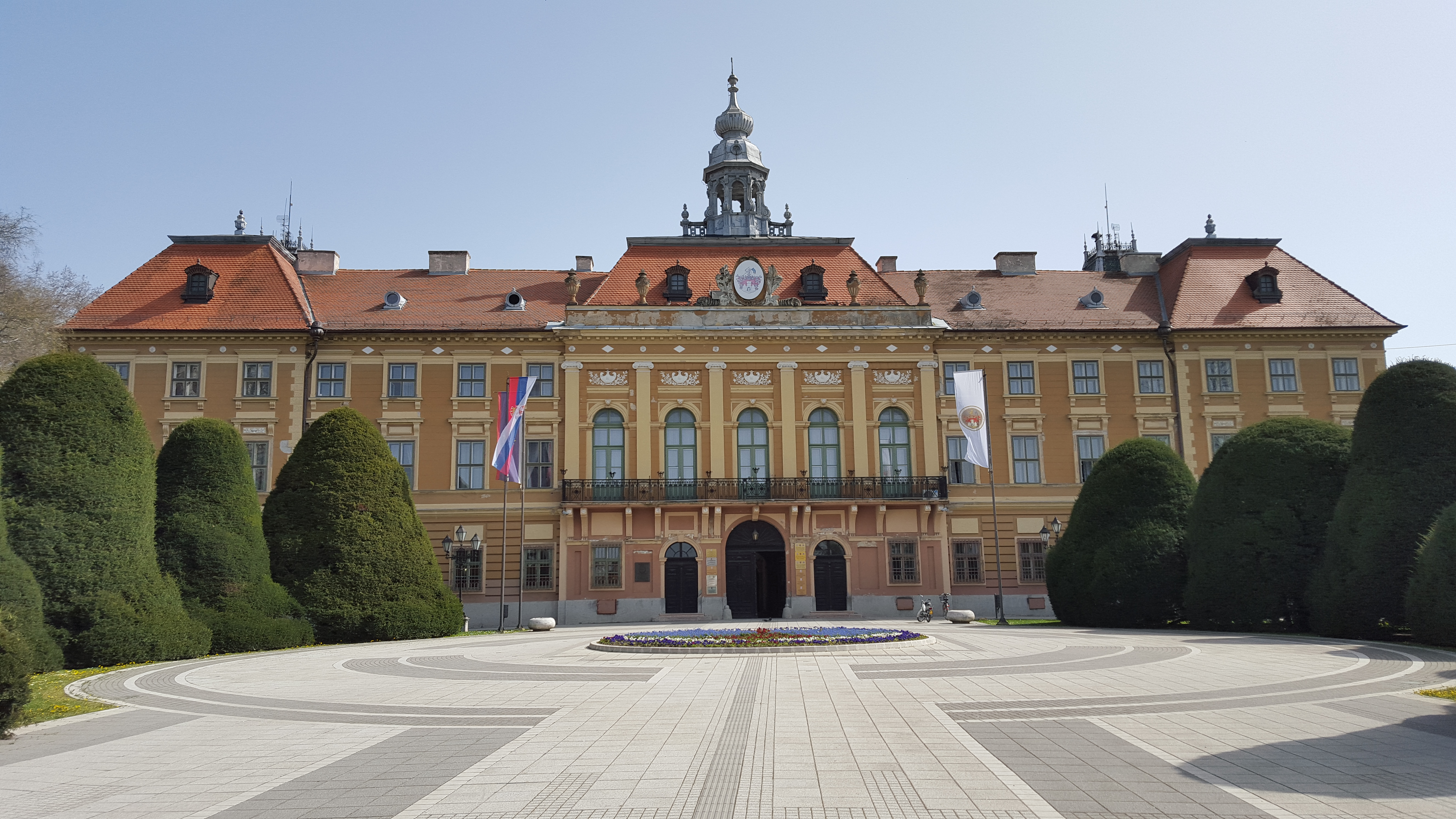
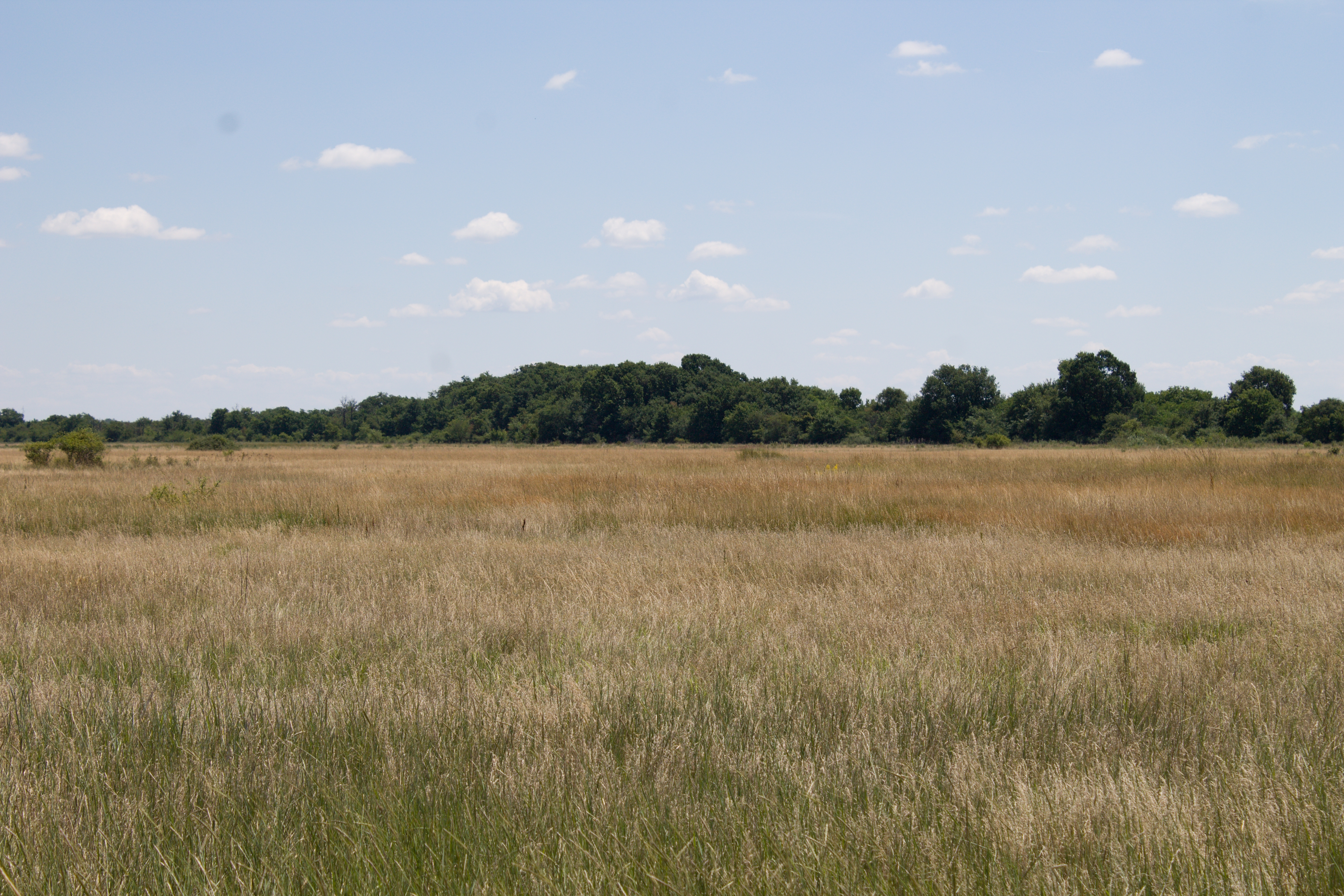
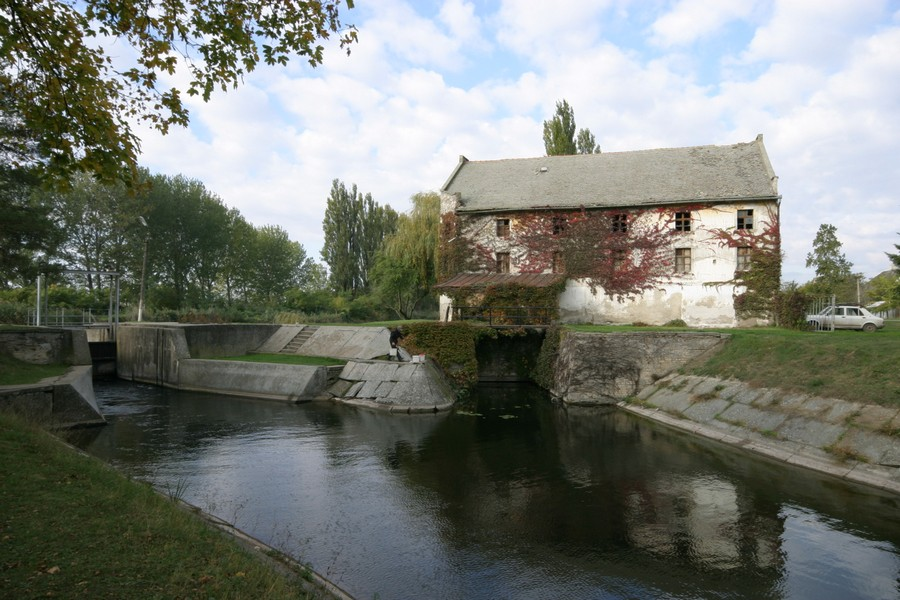
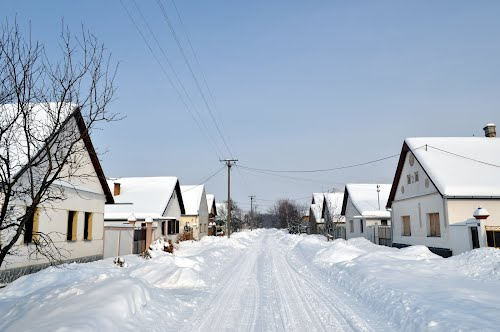
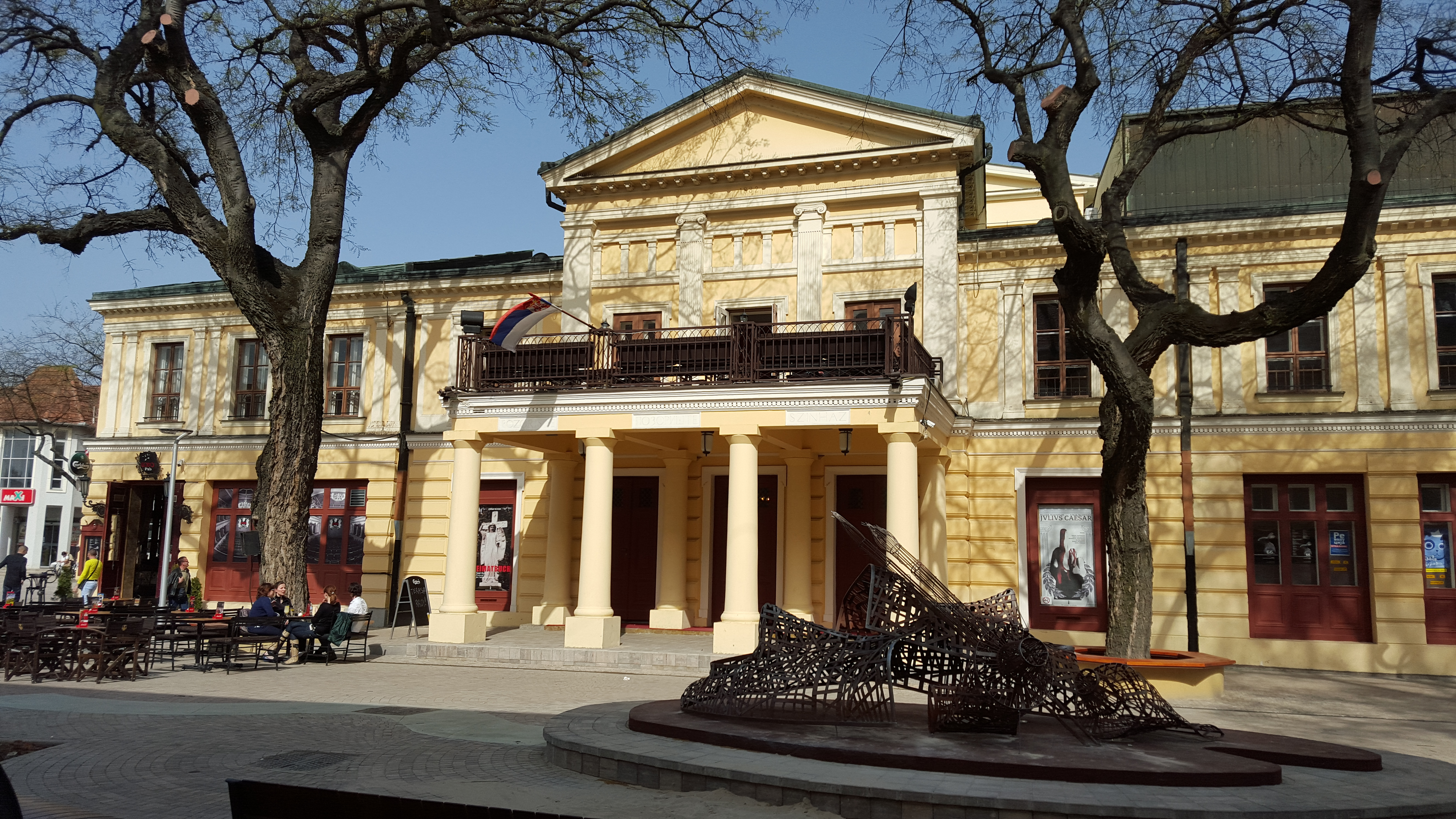
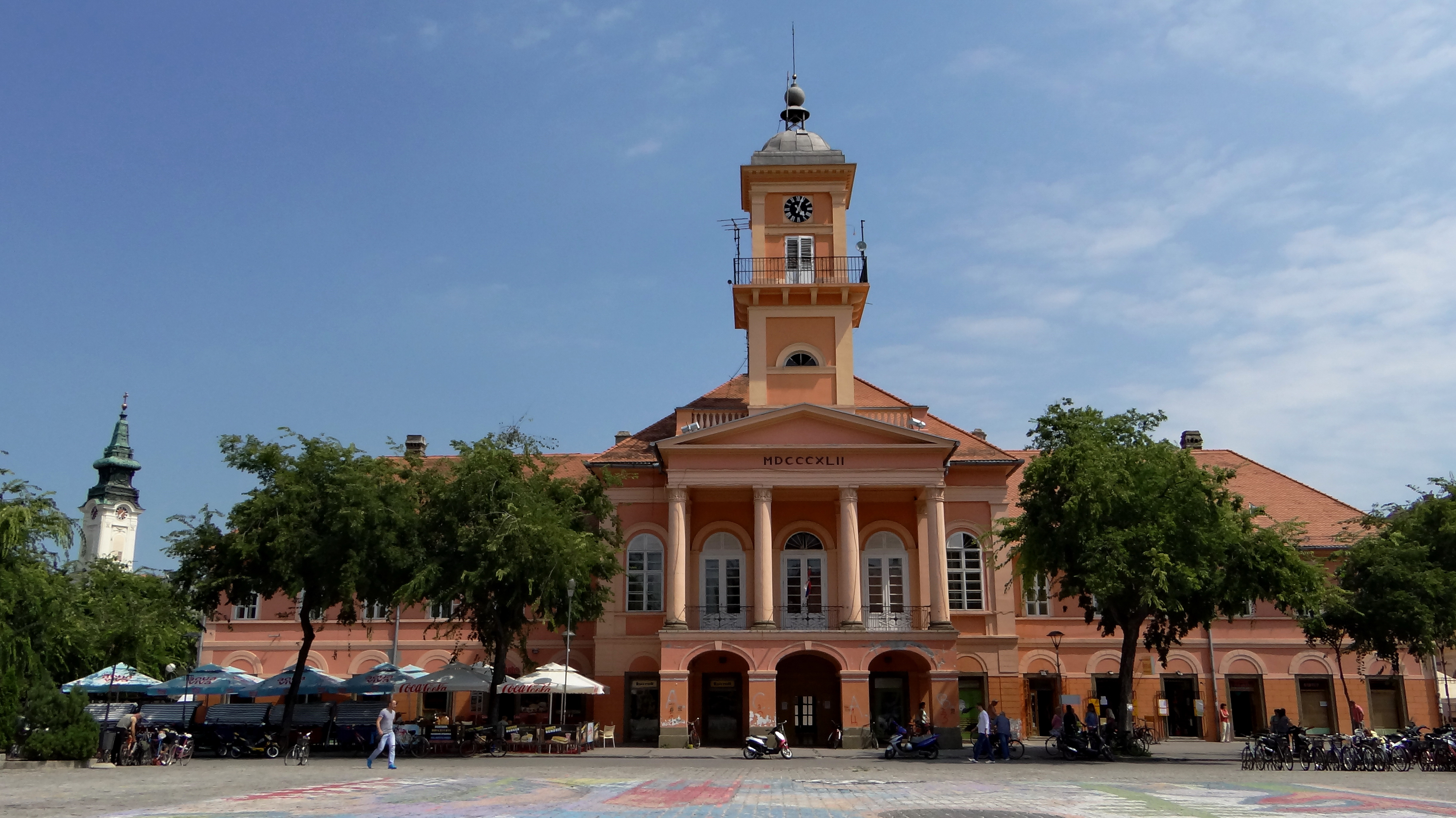
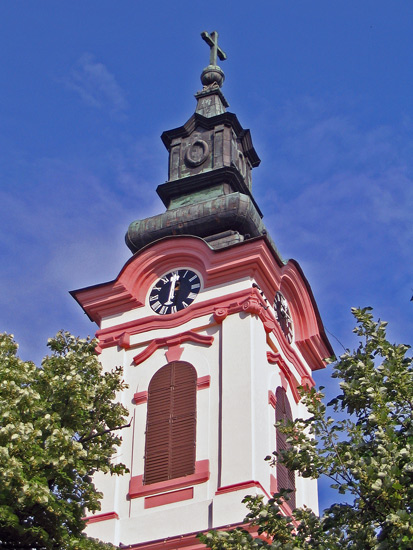
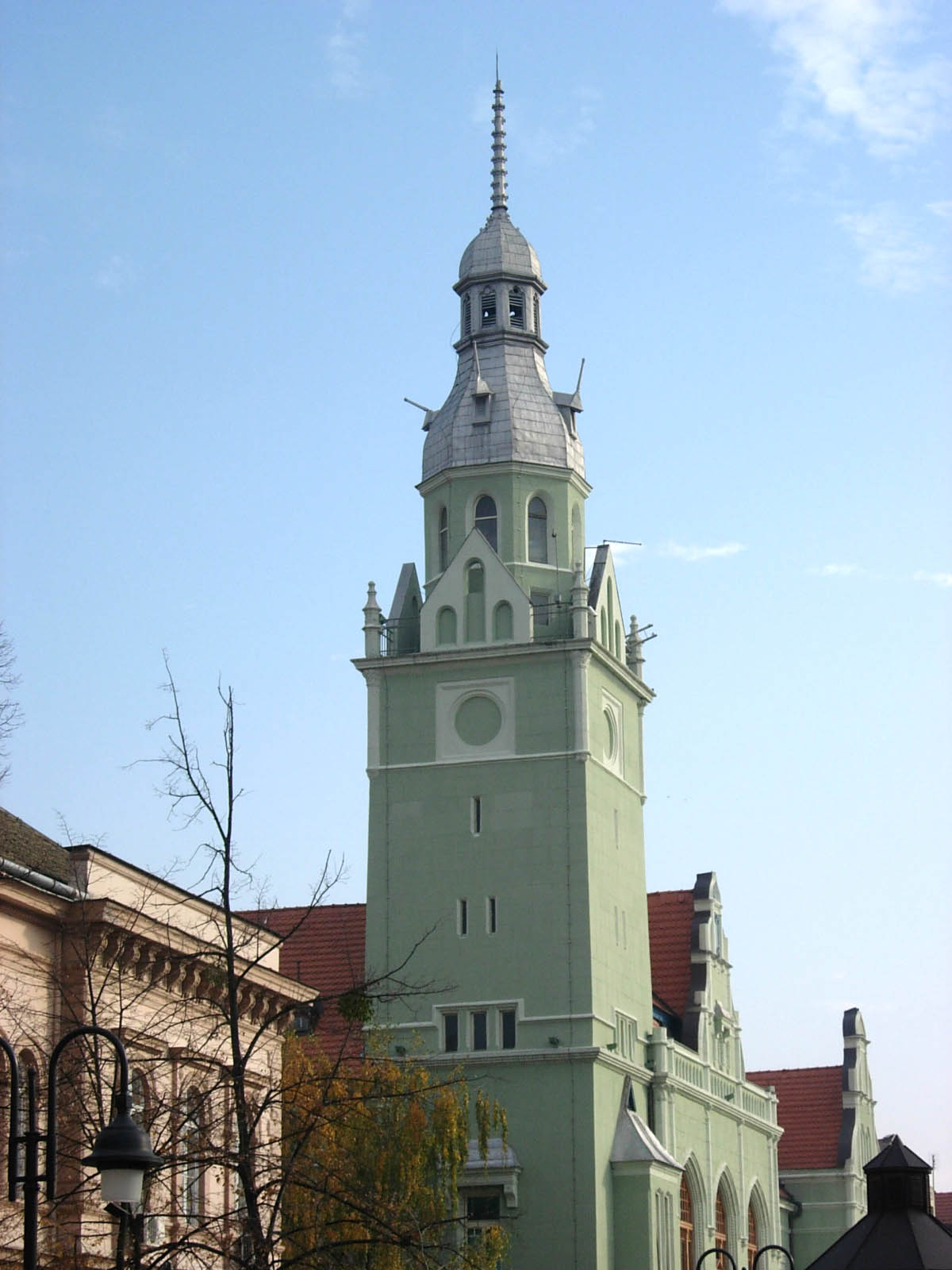
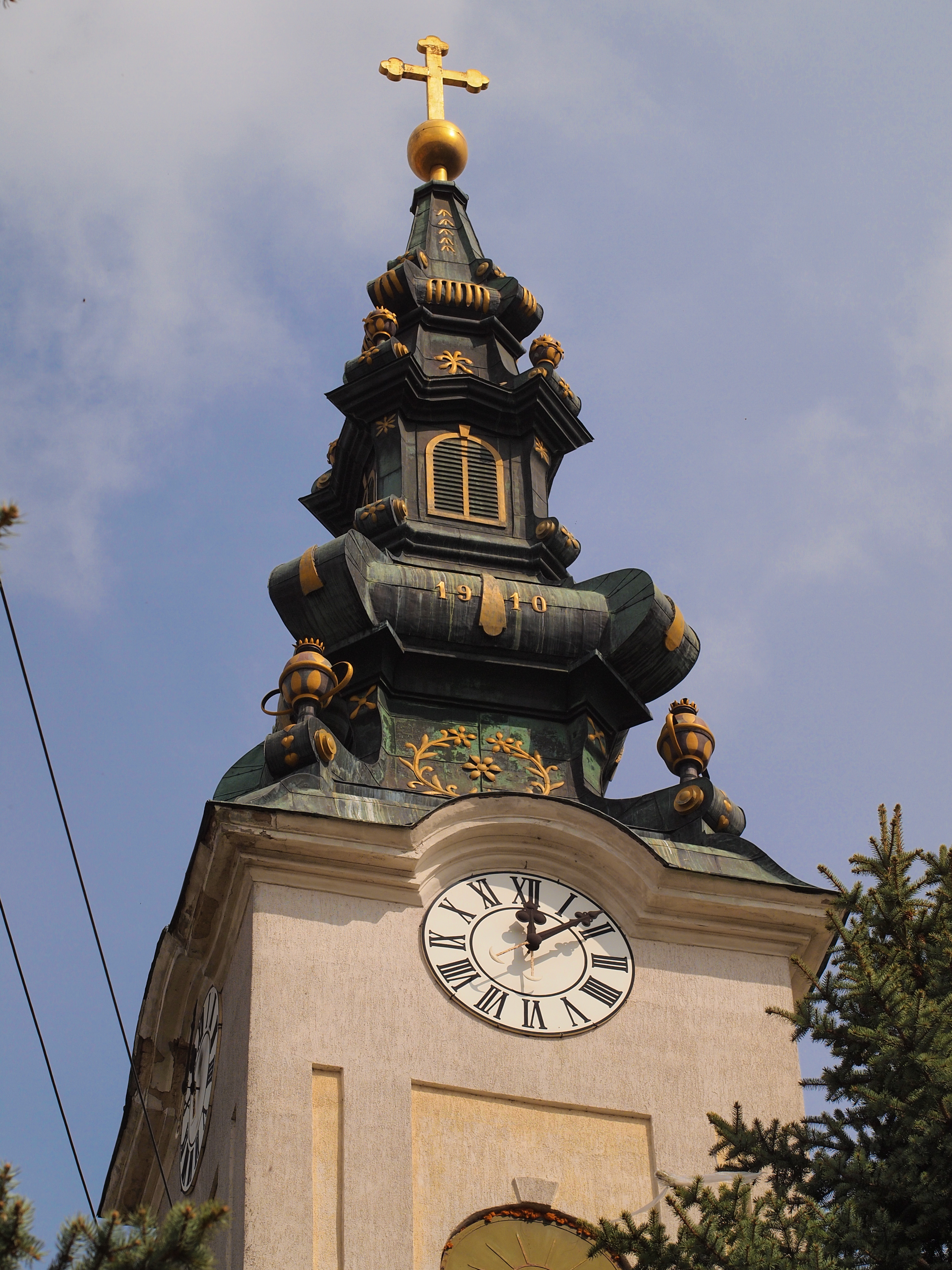
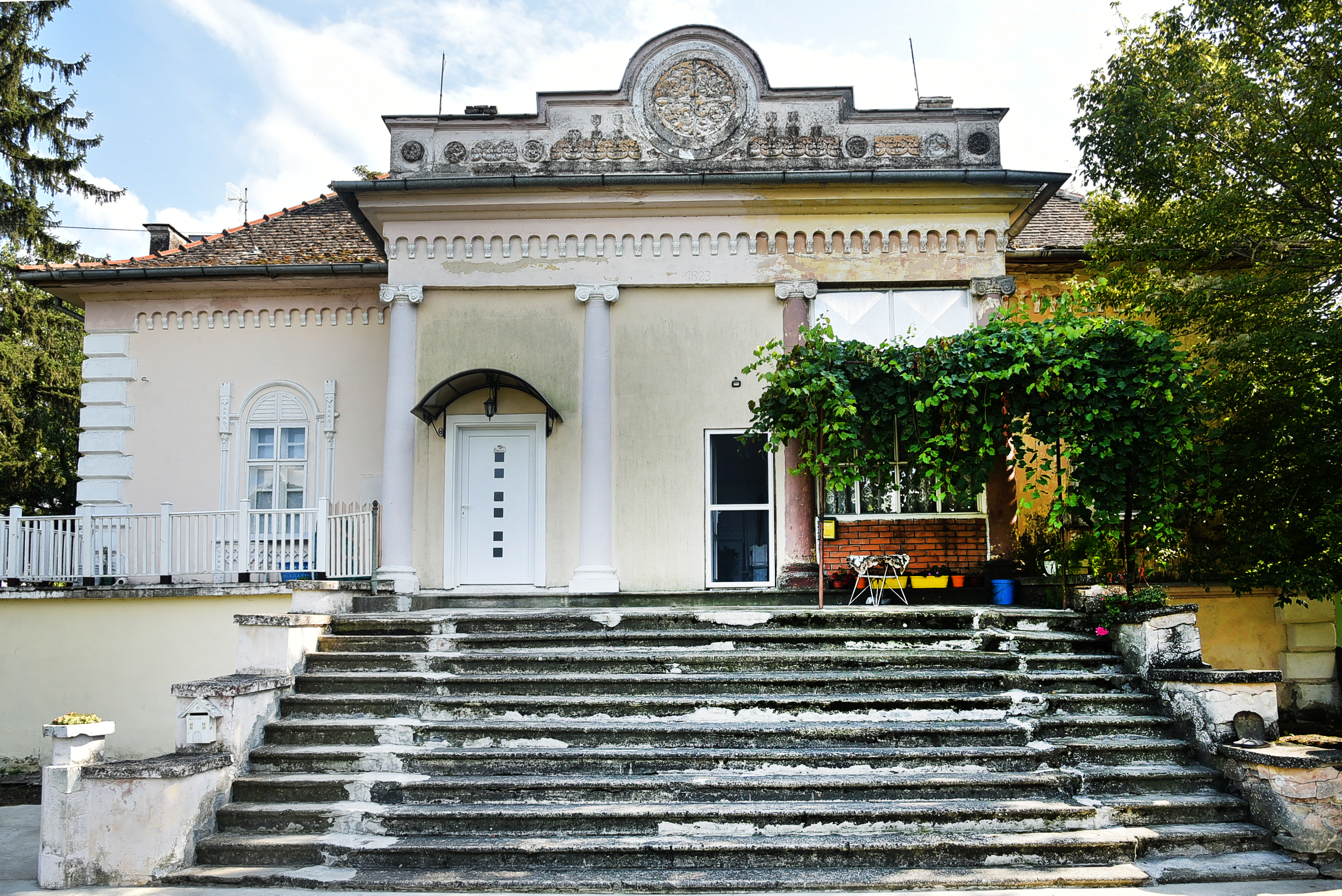
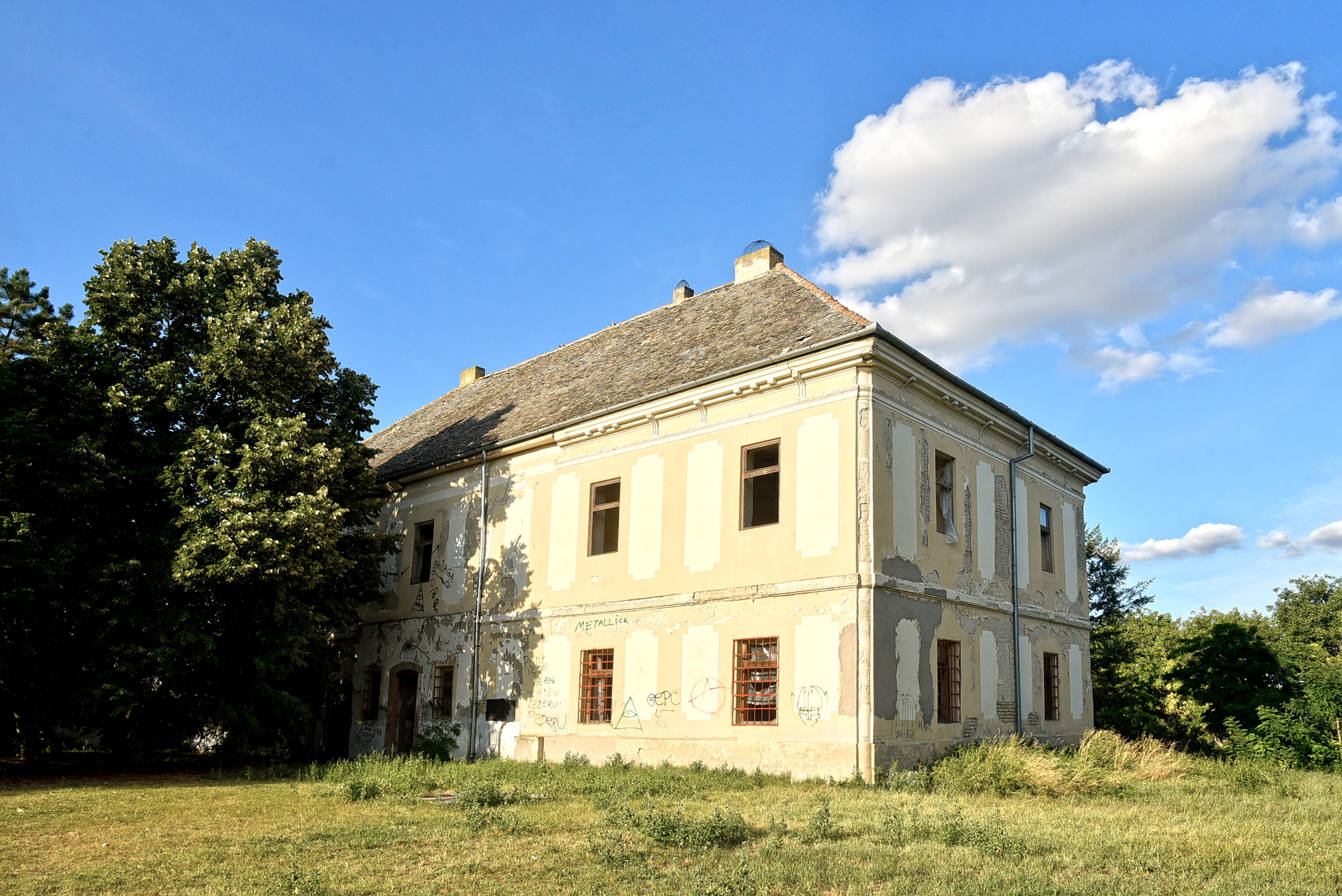
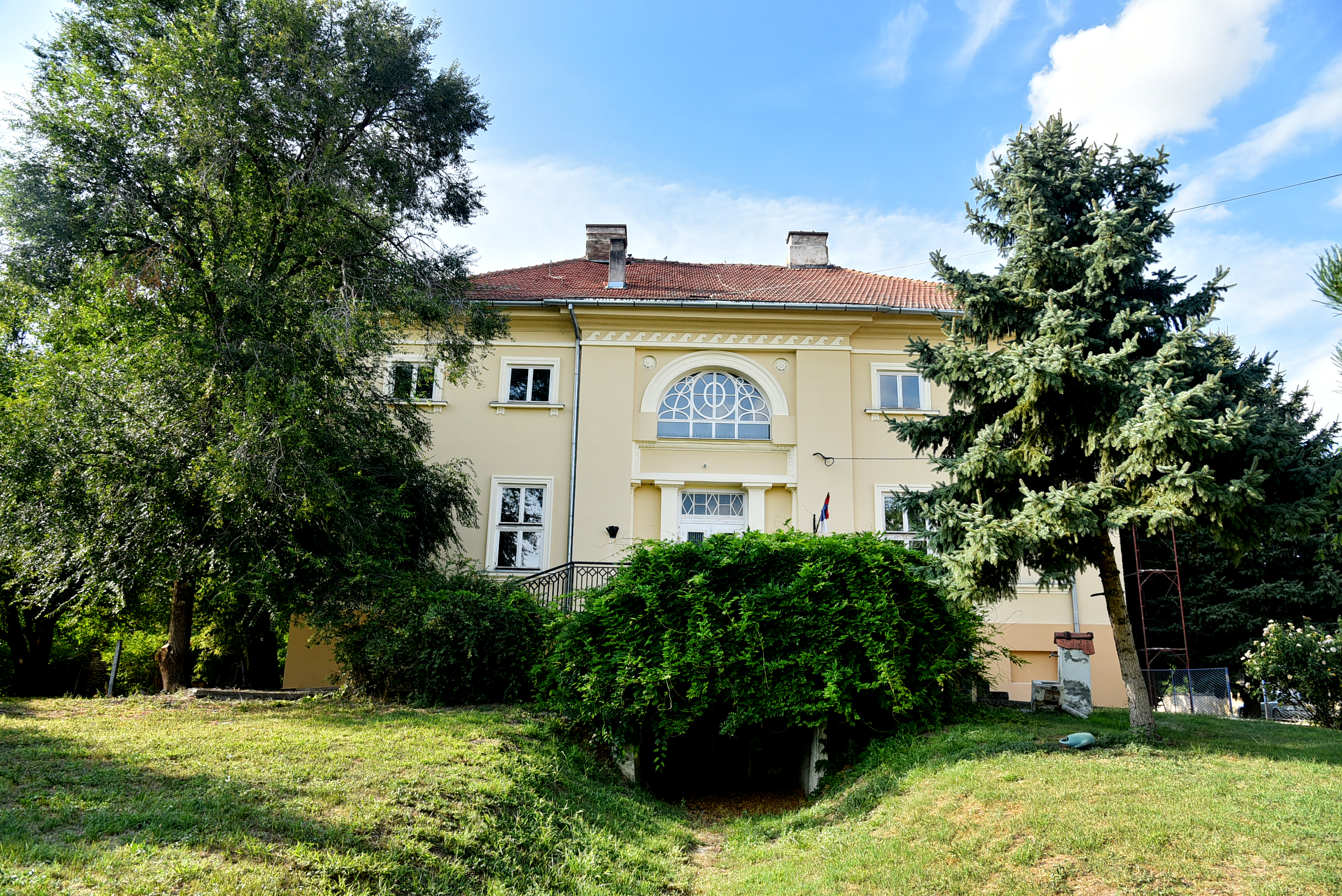
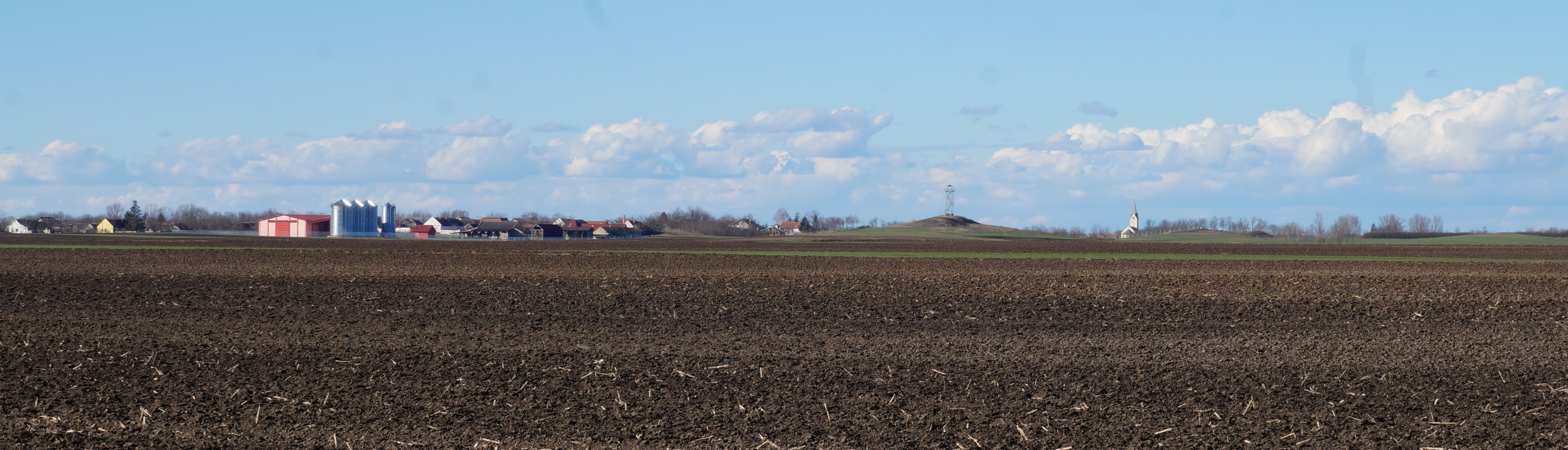
- Images from the West Bačka District

- Location of district in Serbia
- Country: Serbia
- Province: Vojvodina
- Administrative center: Sombor

Government
  - Commissioner: Goran Nonković

Area
  - Total: 2,420 km^{2} (930 sq mi)

Population (2022)
  - Total: 154,491
  - Density: 63.8/km^{2} (165/sq mi)
- ISO 3166 code: RS-05
- Municipalities: 3 and 1 city
- Settlements: 37
- Cities and towns: 5
- Villages: 32
- Website: zapadnobacki.okrug.gov.rs

The West Bačka District (Serbian: Западнобачки округ, romanized: Zapadnobački okrug, pronounced [zâːpadnobâːtʃkiː ôkruːɡ]) is one of administrative districts of Serbia. It lies in the geographical region of Bačka. According to the 2022 census, West Bačka District has a population of 154,491 inhabitants. The administrative center of the district is the city of Sombor.

== History ==
In the 9th century, the area was ruled by the Bulgarian-Slavic duke Salan. From 11th to 16th century, during the administration of the medieval Kingdom of Hungary, the area was divided between the Bodrogiensis County, Bacsensis County, and Csongradiensis County. In 1526–1527, the area was ruled by the independent Serb ruler, emperor Jovan Nenad, while during Ottoman administration (16th-17th century), it was part of the Sanjak of Segedin.

During Habsburg administration (18th century), the area was divided between the Batsch County, Bodrog County and the Military Frontier. The two counties were joined into single Batsch-Bodrog County in the 18th century. Since the abolishment of the Theiß-Marosch section of the Military Frontier in 1751, part of that territory was also included into Batsch-Bodrog County. In the 1850s, the area was mostly part of the Sombor District, with some parts in the Novi Sad District. After 1860, the area was again included into Batsch-Bodrog County.

During the royal Serb-Croat-Slovene (Yugoslav) administration (1918–1941), the area was part of the Novi Sad County (1918–1922), Bačka Oblast (1922–1929), and Danube Banovina (1929–1941).

During the Hungarian-German Axis occupation (1941–1944), the area was included into Bács-Bodrog County. Since 1944, the area was part of autonomous Yugoslav Vojvodina (which was part of newly established Socialist Republic of Serbia since 1945). The present-day administrative districts of Serbia (including West Bačka District) were established in 1992 by the decree of the Government of Serbia.

== Cities and municipalities ==
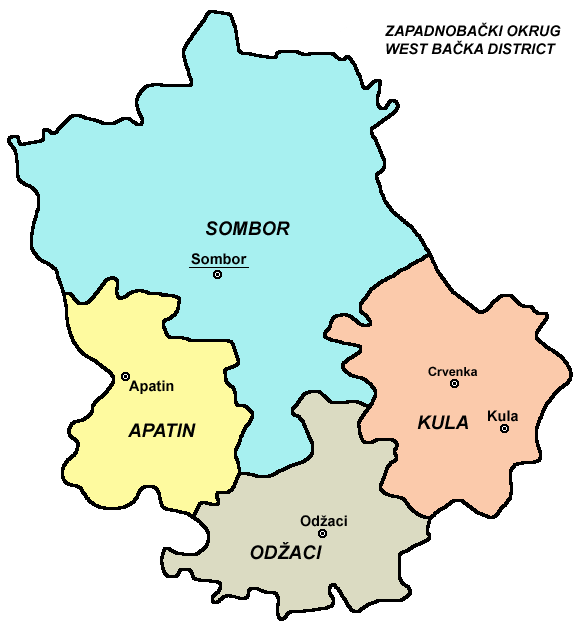
Map of the West Bačka District

West Bačka District encompasses the territories of one city and three municipalities:

- Sombor (city)
- Apatin (municipality)
- Kula (municipality)
- Odžaci (municipality)

== Demographics ==
Historical population
| Year | Pop. | ±% |
|---|---|---|
| 1948 | 200,465 | — |
| 1953 | 207,941 | +3.7% |
| 1961 | 219,331 | +5.5% |
| 1971 | 220,671 | +0.6% |
| 1981 | 220,876 | +0.1% |
| 1991 | 215,916 | −2.2% |
| 2002 | 214,011 | −0.9% |
| 2011 | 188,087 | −12.1% |
| 2022 | 154,491 | −17.9% |

=== Towns ===
There are three towns with over 10,000 inhabitants.

- Sombor: 41,814
- Kula: 14,873
- Apatin: 14,613

=== Ethnic structure ===
| Ethnicity | Population | Share |
|---|---|---|
| Serbs | 102,406 | 66.3% |
| Hungarians | 11,846 | 7.7% |
| Croats | 7,598 | 4.9% |
| Rusyns | 3,690 | 2.4% |
| Roma | 2,827 | 1.8% |
| Montenegrins | 2,382 | 1.5% |
| Others | 8,425 | 5.4% |
| Undeclared/Unknown | 15,317 | 9.9% |

== See also ==
- Administrative districts of Serbia
- Administrative divisions of Serbia
