= State Road 111 (Serbia) =

Road in northern Serbia

State Road 111
- Serbian: Državni put II reda 111; Serbian Cyrillic: Државни пут II реда 111
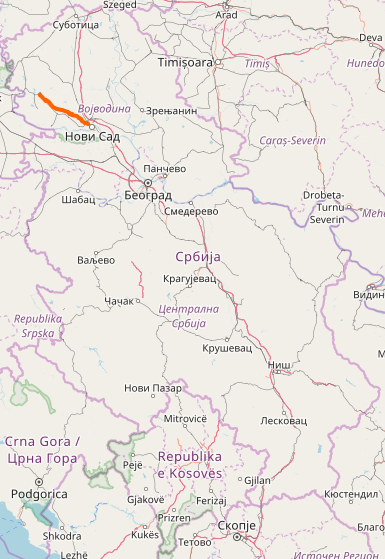

Route information
- Maintained by JP "Putevi Srbije"
- Length: 53.757 km (33.403 mi)

Major junctions
- From: Odžaci
- To: Novi Sad

Location
- Country: Serbia
- Districts: West Bačka, South Bačka

Highway system
- Roads in Serbia; Motorways
← 110	→ 112

State Road 111, is an IIA-class road in northern Serbia, connecting Odžaci with Novi Sad. It is located in Vojvodina.

Before the new road categorization regulation given in 2013, the route wore the following names: P 104, P 102 and P 119 (before 2012) / 107 and 105 (after 2012).

The existing route is a regional road with two traffic lanes. By the valid Space Plan of Republic of Serbia the road is not planned for upgrading to main road, and is expected to be conditioned in its current state.

== Sections ==
Section number	Length	Distance	Section name
11101	7.266 km (4.515 mi)	7.266 km (4.515 mi)	Odžaci (Ratkovo) – Ratkovo (Despotovo)
11102	0.665 km (0.413 mi)	7.931 km (4.928 mi)	Ratkovo (Despotovo) – Ratkovo (Bač) (overlap with)
11103	12.382 km (7.694 mi)	20.313 km (12.622 mi)	Ratkovo (Bač) – Silbaš (Ratkovo)
10807	0.595 km (0.370 mi)	20.908 km (12.992 mi)	Silbaš (Ratkovo) – Silbaš (Bački Petrovac) (overlap with)
11104	25.646 km (15.936 mi)	46.554 km (28.927 mi)	Silbaš (Bački Petrovac) – Rumenka
11105	7.203 km (4.476 mi)	53.757 km (33.403 mi)	Rumenka – Novi Sad (Rumenka)

== See also ==
- Roads in Serbia
