= State Road 108 (Serbia) =

IIA-class road in northern Serbia

State Road 108
- Serbian: Državni put II reda 108; Serbian Cyrillic: Државни пут II реда 108
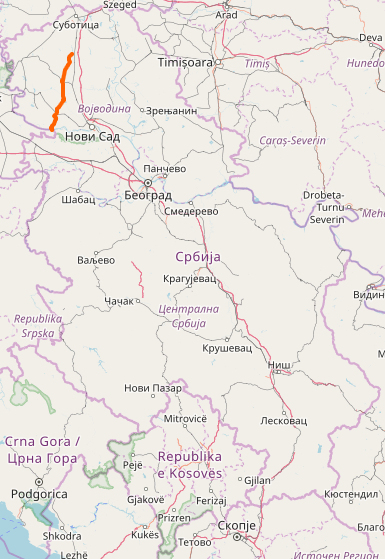

Route information
- Maintained by JP "Putevi Srbije"
- Length: 73.592 km (45.728 mi)

Major junctions
- From: Bačka Topola
- To: Serbia – Croatia border at Bačka Palanka

Location
- Country: Serbia
- Districts: North Bačka, West Bačka, South Bačka

Highway system
- Roads in Serbia; Motorways
← 107	→ 109

State Road 108, is an IIA-class road in northern Serbia, connecting Bačka Topola with Croatia at Bačka Palanka. It is located in Vojvodina.

Before the new road categorization regulation given in 2013, the route wore the following names: P 119, M 3, P 104, P 102 and M 18 (before 2012) / 105 (after 2012).

The existing route is a regional road with two traffic lanes. By the valid Space Plan of Republic of Serbia the road is not planned for upgrading to main road, and is expected to be conditioned in its current state.

== Sections ==
Section number	Length	Distance	Section name
10801	24.760 km (15.385 mi)	24.760 km (15.385 mi)	Bačka Topola (Kula) – Kula (Bačka Topola)
10802	1.564 km (0.972 mi)	26.324 km (16.357 mi)	Kula (Bačka Topola) – Kula (Odžaci)
10803	10.729 km (6.667 mi)	37.053 km (23.024 mi)	Kula (Odžaci) – Savino Selo
10804	5.991 km (3.723 mi)	43.044 km (26.746 mi)	Savino Selo – Despotovo (Zmajevo)
10805	1.015 km (0.631 mi)	44.059 km (27.377 mi)	Despotovo (Zmajevo) – Despotovo (Ratkovo) (overlap with)
10806	8.851 km (5.500 mi)	52.910 km (32.877 mi)	Despotovo (Ratkovo) – Silbaš (Ratkovo)
10807	0.595 km (0.370 mi)	53.505 km (33.246 mi)	Silbaš (Ratkovo) – Silbaš (Bački Petrovac) (overlap with)
10808	4.718 km (2.932 mi)	58.223 km (36.178 mi)	Silbaš (Bački Petrovac) – Gajdobra
10809	9.748 km (6.057 mi)	67.971 km (42.235 mi)	Gajdobra – Bačka Palanka (bypass)
10810	5.621 km (3.493 mi)	73.592 km (45.728 mi)	Bačka Palanka (bypass) – Serbia – Croatia border (Bačka Palanka)

== See also ==
- Roads in Serbia
