= State Road 112 (Serbia) =

Road in northern Serbia

State Road 112
- Serbian: Državni put II reda 112; Serbian Cyrillic: Државни пут II реда 112
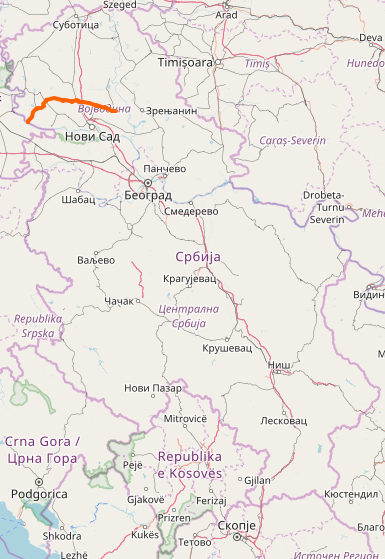

Route information
- Maintained by JP "Putevi Srbije"
- Length: 90.191 km (56.042 mi)

Major junctions
- From: Bačko Novo Selo
- To: Žabalj

Location
- Country: Serbia
- Districts: South Bačka

Highway system
- Roads in Serbia; Motorways
← 111	→ 113

State Road 112, is an IIA-class road in northern Serbia, connecting Bačko Novo Selo with Žabalj. It is located in Vojvodina.

Before the new road categorization regulation given in 2013, the route wore the following names: P 102, P 104 and M 22.1 (before 2012) / 107 and 105 (after 2012).

The existing route is a regional road with two traffic lanes. By the valid Space Plan of Republic of Serbia the road is not planned for upgrading to main road, and is expected to be conditioned in its current state.

== Sections ==
Section number	Length	Distance	Section name
11201	16.443 km (10.217 mi)	16.443 km (10.217 mi)	Bačko Novo Selo – Bač
11202	10.174 km (6.322 mi)	26.617 km (16.539 mi)	Bač – Ratkovo (Bač)
11102	0.665 km (0.413 mi)	27.282 km (16.952 mi)	Ratkovo (Bač) – Ratkovo (Despotovo) (overlap with)
11203	15.216 km (9.455 mi)	42.498 km (26.407 mi)	Ratkovo (Despotovo) – Despotovo (Ratkovo)
10805	1.015 km (0.631 mi)	43.513 km (27.038 mi)	Despotovo (Ratkovo) – Despotovo (Zmajevo) (overlap with)
11204	13.833 km (8.595 mi)	57.346 km (35.633 mi)	Despotovo (Zmajevo) – Zmajevo (Vrbas)
11205	0.937 km (0.582 mi)	58.283 km (36.215 mi)	Zmajevo (Vrbas) – Zmajevo (Rumenka) (overlap with)
11206	3.633 km (2.257 mi)	61.916 km (38.473 mi)	Zmajevo (Rumenka) – Sirig interchange
11207	5.947 km (3.695 mi)	67.863 km (42.168 mi)	Sirig interchange – Sirig (Zmajevo)
10014	0.065 km (0.040 mi)	67.928 km (42.209 mi)	Sirig (Zmajevo) – Sirig (Temerin) (overlap with)
11208	6.569 km (4.082 mi)	74.497 km (46.290 mi)	Sirig (Temerin) – Temerin
11209	15.694 km (9.752 mi)	90.191 km (56.042 mi)	Temerin – Žabalj (Čurug)

== See also ==
- Roads in Serbia
