= State Road 110 (Serbia) =

Road in northern Serbia

State Road 110
- Serbian: Državni put II reda 110; Serbian Cyrillic: Државни пут II реда 110
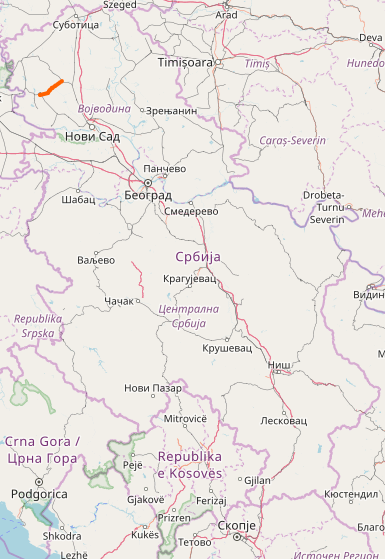

Route information
- Maintained by JP "Putevi Srbije"
- Length: 23.775 km (14.773 mi)

Major junctions
- From: Kula
- To: Odžaci

Location
- Country: Serbia
- Districts: West Bačka

Highway system
- Roads in Serbia; Motorways
| ← 109 | → 111 |

State Road 110, is an IIA-class road in northern Serbia, connecting Kula with Odžaci. It is located in Vojvodina.

Before the new road categorization regulation given in 2013, the route wore the following names: M 3 (before 2012) / 106 (after 2012).

The existing route is a regional road with two traffic lanes. By the valid Space Plan of Republic of Serbia the road is not planned for upgrading to main road, and is expected to be conditioned in its current state.

== Sections ==
| Section number | Length | Distance | Section name |
|---|---|---|---|
| 11001 | 23.473 km (14.585 mi) | 23.473 km (14.585 mi) | Kula (Odžaci) – Odžaci (Ratkovo) |
| 11002 | 0.302 km (0.188 mi) | 23.775 km (14.773 mi) | Odžaci (Ratkovo) – Odžaci (Kula) |

== See also ==
- Roads in Serbia
