= State Road 113 (Serbia) =

Road in Serbia

State Road 113
- Serbian: Državni put II reda 113; Serbian Cyrillic: Државни пут II реда 113
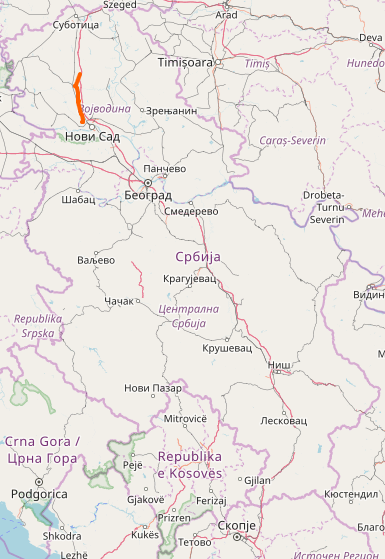

Route information
- Maintained by JP "Putevi Srbije"
- Length: 44.683 km (27.765 mi)

Major junctions
- From: Feketić
- To: Rumenka

Location
- Country: Serbia
- Districts: North Bačka, South Bačka

Highway system
- Roads in Serbia; Motorways
← 112	→ 114

State Road 113, is an IIA-class road in northern Serbia, connecting Feketić with Rumenka. It is located in Vojvodina.

Before the new road categorization regulation given in 2013, the route wore the following names: P 118, P 127, M 3 and P 104 (before 2012) / 19 (after 2012).

The existing route is a regional road with two traffic lanes. By the valid Space Plan of Republic of Serbia the road is not planned for upgrading to main road, and is expected to be conditioned in its current state.

== Sections ==
Section number	Length	Distance	Section name
11301	11.705 km (7.273 mi)	11.705 km (7.273 mi)	Feketić (Vrbas) – Vrbas (Feketić)
01508	1.385 km (0.861 mi)	13.090 km (8.134 mi)	Vrbas (Feketić) – Vrbas (Zmajevo) (overlap with)
11302	11.767 km (7.312 mi)	24.857 km (15.445 mi)	Vrbas (Zmajevo) – Zmajevo (Vrbas)
11205	0.937 km (0.582 mi)	25.794 km (16.028 mi)	Zmajevo (Vrbas) – Zmajevo (Rumenka) (overlap with)
11303	18.889 km (11.737 mi)	44.683 km (27.765 mi)	Zmajevo (Rumenka) – Rumenka

== See also ==
- Roads in Serbia
