= Celan =

Celan is a surname. Notable people with the surname include:

- Kaca Celan (born 1956), Eastern European actress
- Paul Celan (1920–1970), Eastern European poet and translator
- Gisèle Celan-Lestrange (1927–1991), French graphic artist
