= Tanović =

- Language: Bosnian

Other names
- Variant form: Tanković

Tanović is a surname. Notable people with the surname include:

- Danis Tanović (born 1969), Bosnian film director and screenwriter
- Lejla Tanović (born 1994), Bosnian mountain bike racing and road cyclist
- Tajna Tanović, German singer-songwriter, actress and photographer
