= Perošević =

Perošević is a Serbo-Croatian surname. Notable people with the surname include:

- Antonio Perošević (born 1992), Croatian footballer
- Boško Perošević (1956–2000), Serbian politician
