= State Road 109 (Serbia) =

Road in northern Serbia

State Road 109
- Serbian: Državni put II reda 109; Serbian Cyrillic: Државни пут II реда 109
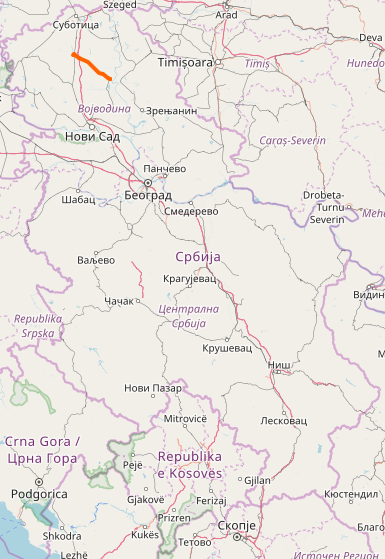

Route information
- Maintained by JP "Putevi Srbije"
- Length: 37.995 km (23.609 mi)

Major junctions
- From: Bačka Topola
- To: Bečej

Location
- Country: Serbia
- Districts: North Bačka, Central Banat

Highway system
- Roads in Serbia; Motorways
← 108	→ 110

State Road 109, is an IIA-class road in northern Serbia, connecting Bačka Topola with Bečej. It is located in Vojvodina.

Before the new road categorization regulation given in 2013, the route wore the following names: P 108 (before 2012) / 120 (after 2012).

The existing route is a regional road with two traffic lanes. By the valid Space Plan of Republic of Serbia the road is not planned for upgrading to main road, and is expected to be conditioned in its current state.

== Sections ==
Section number	Length	Distance	Section name
10901	37.995 km (23.609 mi)	37.995 km (23.609 mi)	Bačka Topola (Bečej) – Bečej (Bačka Topola)

== See also ==
- Roads in Serbia
