= Tarkovič =

Tarkovič is a Slovak surname. Notable people with the surname include:

- Gregor Tarkovič (1754–1841), Slovak Greek Catholic hierarch
- Štefan Tarkovič (born 1973), Slovak footballer and manager

== See also ==
- Tanković
- Turković
