= Boško Perošević =

Serbian politician

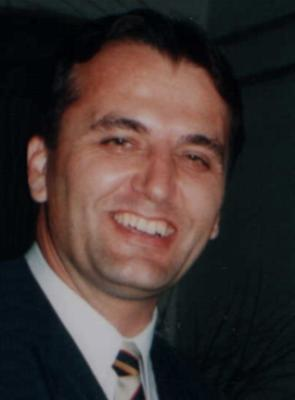
- Perošević in 1997

Chairman of the Executive Council of Vojvodina
- In office February 1993 – 13 May 2000
- Preceded by: Koviljko Lovre
- Succeeded by: Damnjan Radenković

Personal details
- Born: 17 September 1956 Odžaci, PR Serbia, FPR Yugoslavia
- Died: 13 May 2000 (aged 43) Novi Sad, Serbia, FR Yugoslavia
- Manner of death: Assassination
- Resting place: City Cemetery, Novi Sad, Serbia
- Party: Socialist Party of Serbia
- Spouse: Marina Perošević (1960–2019)
- Occupation: Politician

Boško Perošević (Serbian Cyrillic: Бошко Перошевић; 17 September 1956 – 13 May 2000) was a Serbian politician. He serves as a Chairman of the Executive Council of Vojvodina in 1993 until his assassination in 2000.

== Biography ==
Perošević was born in Odžaci and grew up in the near-by village of Ratkovo. He completed elementary and secondary school in Ratkovo and Odžaci, then Higher School of machine engineering and Economical Faculty in Subotica and received his master's degree at the Technological Faculty in Novi Sad. He visited the Soviet Union as a student and in addition to Serbian, he spoke Russian and English.

In the specialized magazines he released several professional papers, while as a designer of tools and devices he patented several innovations. He published a study Kalupi za injekciono presovanje plastomera and together with three co-authors was published a book Promenama do uspešnog preduzeća.

In the one time he was worked as an engineer in the industry Ivo Lola Ribar from Odžaci, then was in 1992 appointed as a president of the municipal assembly of Odžaci. In this function he spent only one year, and in 1993 he became the Chairman of the Executive Council of Vojvodina.

From that foundation, Perošević was a member of Slobodan Milošević's Socialist Party of Serbia and of the provincial committee of that party and between 1990 and 1995 he was a president of the committee.

== Death ==
Perošević was shot in the head on 13 May 2000 during the tour of Novi Sad Fair. He was pronounced dead at the scene. His assassin was Milivoje Gutović from Perošević's home village of Ratkovo, the doorman of the Fair.
