= Tajna Tanović =

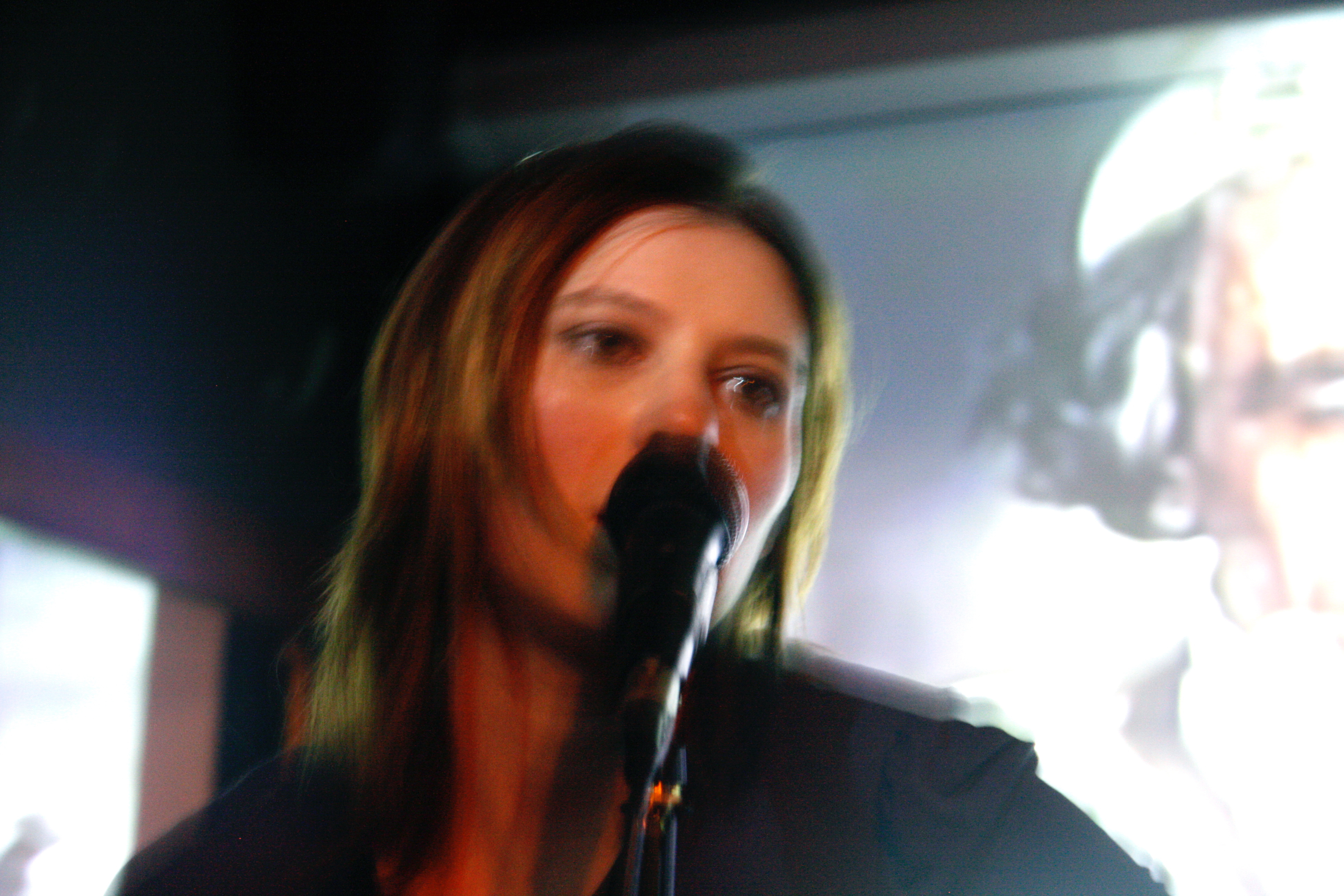
- Tajna Tanović performing in New York City in 2011

Background information
- Origin: Sarajevo, Bosnia-Herzegovina; Germany
- Genres: Alternative rock; indie folk; indie pop
- Occupations: Singer-songwriter; actress; photographer; producer
- Instruments: Vocals; guitar; piano
- Website: tajnatanovic.com

Tajna Tanović is a German singer-songwriter, actress, photographer and producer born in Sarajevo, Bosnia-Herzegovina. She has worked in the performing arts in Sarajevo, Ljubljana (Slovenia), throughout Germany, New York City and Los Angeles.

== Early work ==
Tanović starred as Liza Minnelli in Kids Cabaret for the National Television in Sarajevo. From 1993 to 2004 Tanović was the leading actress of Theater TAS in Germany and was featured in Project 3 by TAS touring theaters such the Munich Kammerspiele, Hamburg's Thalia Theater and Cankar Hall, the cultural and congress center in Ljubljana, Slovenia. In 1994 she was nominated for the Best Young Artist Award by the State of North Rhine-Westphalia (Germany) for the role of the Girl in "Project 3". Performances with Theater TAS included the UNESCO Children in Need gala in Düsseldorf in 1993 and a performance in the German Parliament on Human Rights Day, 1998.

== New York ==
Tanović was featured in the project "Canal Street Station" by 31 Down Radio Theater gaining much press coverage. She was the German voice for the PUMA SoundTrip for the 2006 FIFA World Cup produced by Soundwalk. In April 2009, she collaborated with Theater TAS and award-winning writer-director Kaća Čelan in New York City to produce the window performance and visual art installation "Yard Sale: New Footfalls..." presented by the arts organization chashama. Tanović also provided the translation of "New Footfalls". In 2010, Yard Sale: New Footfalls... was presented by the DUMBO Arts Festival. In 2010, she was featured in the Theater TAS production The Last Story, an award-winning drama by Kaća Čelan.

== Singer-songwriter ==
Tanović held two concerts (2001 and 2003) at Nobel Prize winner Heinrich Böll's summer festival in Langenbroich, Germany. Tanović was a singer in the band "Love in Shakespeare" performing Shakespeare's sonnets. She has also written the music for the short film Dolly Belle (2009). as well as the melody in the performance Yard Sale: New Footfalls…. Her songs "I Think of You" and "Hey! Hey!" were featured in the theater performance "Mirjana and those around her" by MGL Theater Ljubljana (Slovenia).

== I Think of You ==
On 30 September 2011, she self-released her debut EP I Think of You. It consists of five original songs: "Mount Everest", "75 Degrees Sunny Chances of Rain", "In the RaiNY City", "Burning House" and the title track "I Think of You". It was recorded at The Bunker Studio in Brooklyn, written and produced by Tajna Tanović, produced, mixed and engineered by John Davis, mastered by Randy Merrill at Masterdisk and executive produced by Jack Sharkey. Musicians on the EP include Tanović on lead and backing vocals, acoustic guitar, piano and percussion, John Davis on electric and double bass, keyboards, piano and percussion, Aaron Nevezie on electric guitar and glockenspiel, and Dave Burnett on drums and percussion. In September 2012, she released the music video for the title song "I Think of You", written by her and directed by Samuel Nozik (Bones). The two had previously collaborated on Tanović's short film Dolly Belle. Scenes from the short appear in the music video for "Burning House".

== Producing ==
Tanović has worked in film, television, theater and event production since 2006. She currently serves as Creative Executive at Taylor Lane Productions, an independent film and TV production company in Los Angeles. Earlier in her career, Tanović co-founded Theater TAS with Kaća Čelan, a theater and multimedia production company operating in New York City and Los Angeles, and worked at Dalzell Productions in New York City, producing special events including the Tribeca Film Festival.

== Personal life ==
Tanović speaks English, German, French and Bosnian.
