= State Road 115 (Serbia) =

Road in Serbia

State Road 115
- Serbian: Državni put II reda 115; Serbian Cyrillic: Државни пут II реда 115
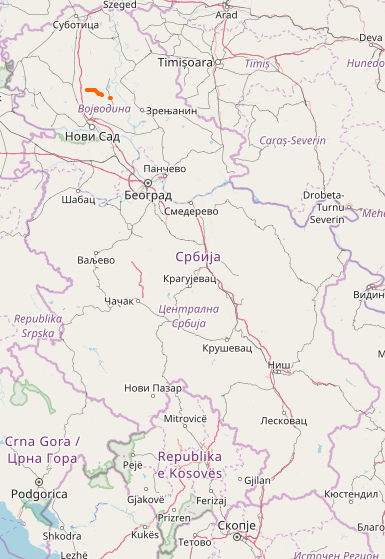

Route information
- Maintained by JP "Putevi Srbije"
- Length: 14.895 km (9.255 mi) 7.900 km (4.909 mi) unconstructed 22.795 km (14.164 mi) planned

Major junctions
- From: Srbobran
- To: Čurug

Location
- Country: Serbia
- Districts: South Bačka

Highway system
- Roads in Serbia; Motorways
← 114	→ 116

State Road 115, is an IIA-class road in northern Serbia, connecting Srbobran with Čurug. It is located in Vojvodina.

Before the new road categorization regulation given in 2013, the route wore the following name: P 129.

The existing route is a regional road with two traffic lanes. By the valid Space Plan of Republic of Serbia the road is not planned for upgrading to main road, and is expected to be conditioned in its current state. The construction phase of section between Nadalj and Čurug hasn't been commenced yet.

== Sections ==
Section number	Length	Distance	Section name
11501	14.895 km (9.255 mi)	14.895 km (9.255 mi)	Srbobran (Turija) – Nadalj
Unconstructed section
11502	7.900 km (4.909 mi)	22.795 km (14.164 mi)	Nadalj – Čurug

== See also ==
- Roads in Serbia
