= Tanković =

Tanković is a surname. Notable people with the surname include:

- Armin Tanković (born 1990), Swedish footballer
- Ivica Tanković, Croatian footballer
- Muamer Tanković (born 1995), Swedish footballer

== See also ==
- Janković
- Tanović
- Tarkovič
