= State Road 116 (Serbia) =

Road in Serbia

State Road 116
- Serbian: Državni put II reda 116; Serbian Cyrillic: Државни пут II реда 116
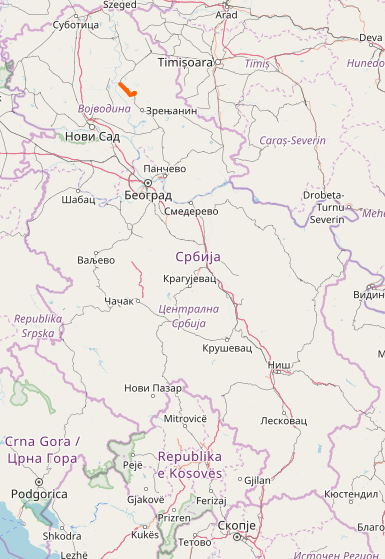

Route information
- Maintained by JP "Putevi Srbije"
- Length: 20.357 km (12.649 mi)

Major junctions
- From: Novi Bečej
- To: Melenci

Location
- Country: Serbia
- Districts: Central Banat

Highway system
- Roads in Serbia; Motorways
← 115	→ 117

State Road 116, is an IIA-class road in northern Serbia, connecting Novi Bečej with Melenci. It is located in Vojvodina.

Before the new road categorization regulation given in 2013, the route wore the following names: P 113 (before 2012) / 121 (after 2012).

The existing route is a regional road with two traffic lanes. By the valid Space Plan of Republic of Serbia the road is not planned for upgrading to main road, and is expected to be conditioned in its current state.

== Sections ==
Section number	Length	Distance	Section name
11601	20.357 km (12.649 mi)	20.357 km (12.649 mi)	Novi Bečej (Melenci) – Melenci

== See also ==
- Roads in Serbia
