= Goran Nikolić (politician) =

Serbian politician

Goran Nikolić (Serbian Cyrillic: Горан Николић; born 1967) is a народни посланик in Serbia. He has served in the National Assembly of Serbia from 2016 to 2020, at which time he became the mayor of Odžaci. Nikolić is a member of Serbian Progressive Party.

== Private career ==
Nikolić is a customs officer in Odžaci in the autonomous province of Vojvodina.

== Politician ==
Nikolić received the twenty-fifth position on the Progressive Party's Let's Get Vojvodina Moving electoral list in the 2012 Vojvodina provincial election. (At this time, half the seats in the Assembly of Vojvodina were determined by proportional representation and half by single-member constituency elections.) The list won fourteen seats and Nikolić did not serve in his party's assembly delegation. He was subsequently a member of the Odžaci municipal council (i.e., the executive branch of the municipal government) from 2014 to 2016, with responsibility for agriculture and rural development.

He received the sixty-fifth position on the Progressive Party's Aleksandar Vučić – Serbia Is Winning list in the 2016 Serbian parliamentary election and was elected when the list won a majority with 131 out of 250 mandates. In parliament, he was a member of the committee on the diaspora and Serbs in the region, a deputy member of the committee on administrative, budgetary, mandate, and immunity issues, and a member of the parliamentary friendship groups with Norway, Russia, and Switzerland. He was not a candidate for re-election to parliament in 2020.

Nikolić led the Progressive Party to a majority victory for Odžaci in the 2020 Serbian local elections and was chosen as mayor when the new assembly convened.
