= State Road 114 (Serbia) =

Road in Serbia

State Road 114
- Serbian: Državni put II reda 114; Serbian Cyrillic: Државни пут II реда 114
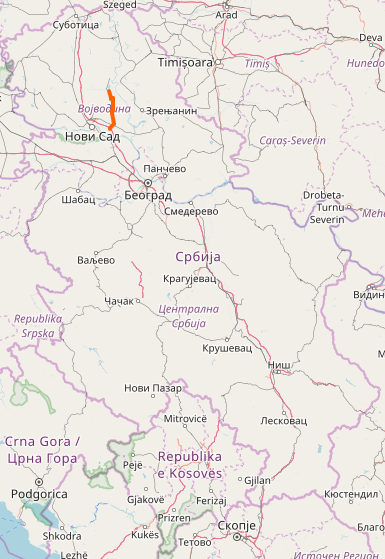

Route information
- Maintained by JP "Putevi Srbije"
- Length: 44.683 km (27.765 mi)

Major junctions
- From: 102 at Bačko Gradište
- To: A1 / E75 at Kovilj

Location
- Country: Serbia
- Districts: South Bačka

Highway system
- Roads in Serbia; Motorways
← 113	→ 115

State Road 114, is an IIA-class road in northern Serbia, connecting Bačko Gradište with Kovilj. It is located in Vojvodina.

Before the new road categorization regulation given in 2013, the route wore the following name: P 112.

The existing route is a regional road with two traffic lanes. By the valid Space Plan of Republic of Serbia the road is not planned for upgrading to main road, and is expected to be conditioned in its current state.

== Sections ==
Section number	Length	Distance	Section name
11401	6.654 km (4.135 mi)	6.654 km (4.135 mi)	Bačko Gradište – Čurug
11402	13.809 km (8.581 mi)	20.463 km (12.715 mi)	Čurug – Žabalj (Čurug)
11403	2.028 km (1.260 mi)	22.491 km (13.975 mi)	Žabalj (Čurug) – Žabalj (Šajkaš)
11404	9.490 km (5.897 mi)	31.981 km (19.872 mi)	Žabalj (Šajkaš) – Šajkaš
11405	5.666 km (3.521 mi)	37.647 km (23.393 mi)	Šajkaš – Kovilj (link with A1)

== See also ==
- Roads in Serbia
