= Silbaš =

Silbaš Силбаш (Serbian) Silbaš (Slovak)
- Village (Selo)
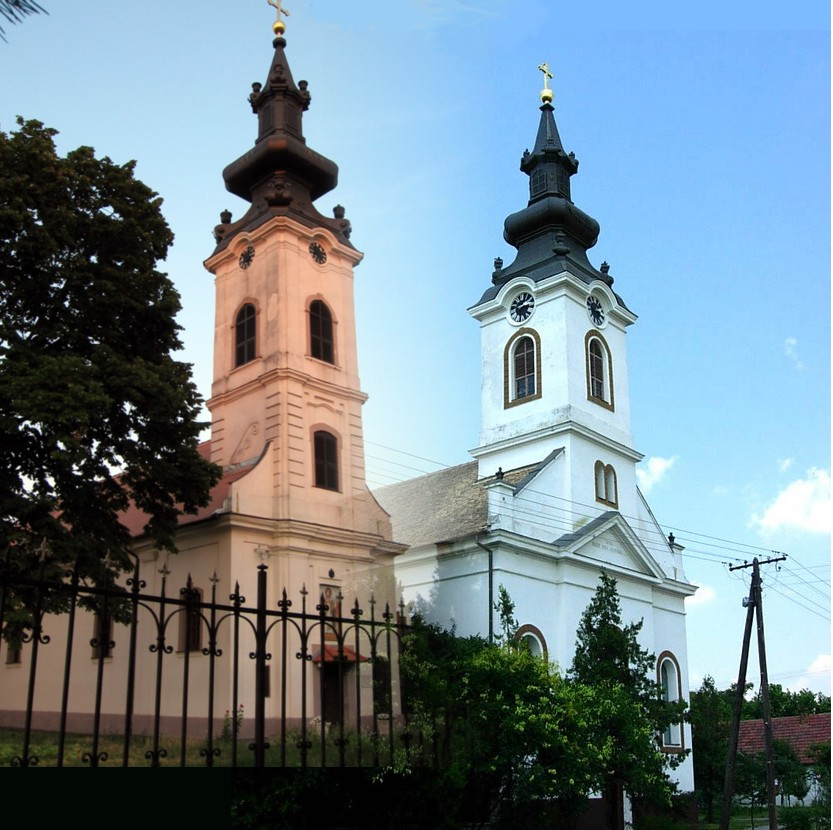
- Serbian Orthodox Church and Slovak Evangelical A.V. Church

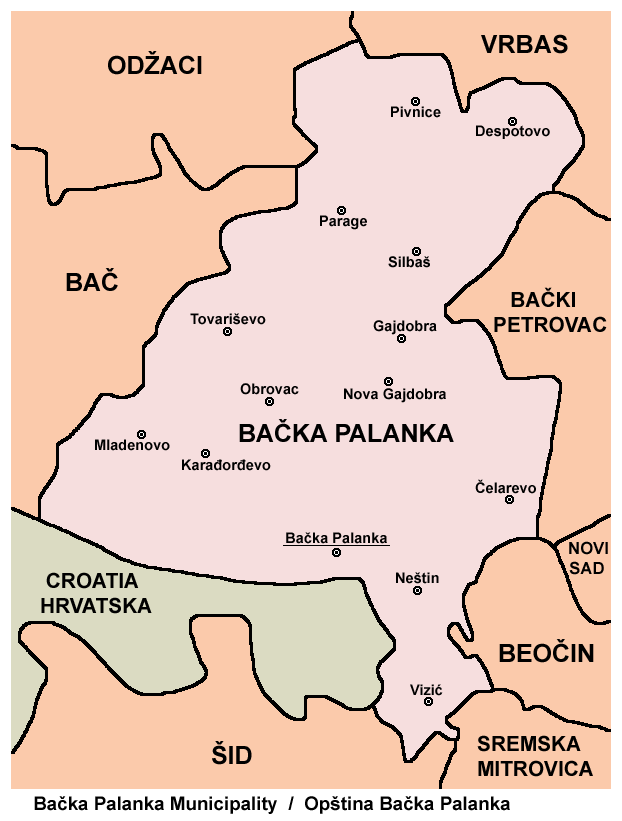
- Map of the Bačka Palanka municipality, showing the location of Silbaš

- Location within Serbia Silbaš (Serbia) Silbaš (Europe)
- Coordinates: 45°24′N 19°28′E
- Country: Serbia
- Province: Vojvodina
- Region: Bačka
- District: South Bačka
- Municipality: Bačka Palanka

Area
  - Total: 42.6 km^{2} (16.4 sq mi)

Population (2011)
  - Total: 2,467
  - Density: 57.9/km^{2} (150/sq mi)
- Time zone: UTC+1 (CET)
  - Summer (DST): UTC+2 (CEST)
- Postal code: 21433
- Area code: 021
- Vehicle registration: BP

Silbaš (Serbian Cyrillic: Силбаш) is a village located in the Bačka Palanka municipality, South Bačka District, Vojvodina, Serbia. As of 2011 census, it has a population of 2,467 inhabitants.

== Historical population ==
Historical population
| Year | Pop. | ±% p.a. |
|---|---|---|
| 1961 | 3,267 | — |
| 1971 | 3,144 | −0.38% |
| 1981 | 3,025 | −0.39% |
| 1991 | 2,806 | −0.75% |
| 2002 | 2,849 | +0.14% |
| 2011 | 2,467 | −1.59% |

== See also ==
- List of places in Serbia
- List of cities, towns and villages in Vojvodina
