= Kaća Čelan =

Serbian writer and theatre director

Kaća Čelan (born August 5, 1956 in Ratkovo, SR Serbia, FPR Yugoslavia) is a writer, director, theatre and acting expert, professor and actress. She is internationally known for being awarded the first prize for the best German-language play from the Bund der Theatergemeinden (Alliance of the German Theatre Community) for her play Heimatbuch among other awards.

== Biography ==
=== Early life ===
Kaća Čelan (Serbian Cyrillic: Каћа Челан) was born and grew up in Ratkovo (Odžaci), SR Serbia, FPR Yugoslavia; an area in the multicultural and multifaceted region of Vojvodina, dominated by five cultures and languages: Serbian, Hungarian, German, Ukrainian (Rusyn) and Czech, which influenced and shaped her early childhood. She graduated from the scientific high school in Odžaci and its rigorous classical curriculum with straight A's as best student of her generation.

=== Move to Sarajevo ===
After finishing her high school education, she chose the city of Sarajevo as her "home of choice". Her studies in the Olympic metropolis included comparative literature, theatre studies, and acting at the University of Sarajevo. Following her studies, she founded Teatar Amfiteatar Sarajevo (TAS) theatre, which she ran for seven years. Čelan has also worked as a directing professor at the Academy for Scenic Arts, Sarajevo. Her awards have included Best Young Actress in Socialist Republic of Bosnia and Herzegovina, the Yugoslavian award for avant-garde Arts, and Best Director award at the Avant-garde Theatre Festival in Socialist Republic of Montenegro. She has been the production director of the International Theatre Festival in Kotor, Montenegro. As a theatre academic she held fellowships in Moscow and Vienna.

=== Slovenia and Germany ===
Prior to the siege of Sarajevo, Čelan moved to Ljubljana, Slovenia, where she worked as a writer and director for a year. With a fellowship from the German cultural department and the Heinrich Böll Foundation in hand, she moved to Germany in 1993. In the Böll-House, she founded the TAS theatre in exile, and during its first project, Project 3, she toured well-known German theatres such as the Munich Kammerspiele and Hamburg's Thalia Theater. In 1999 she founded her acting school, the Čelan Theatre School at Burgau Castle, where her theatre was based as well. In 1995, Čelan won the first prize for the best German-language play from the Bund der Theatergemeinden (Alliance of the German Theatre Community) for her play Heimatbuch. That was followed by the International Award, Kristal Vilenice, for poetry in 1996. The next year the Cultural Minister of North Rhine-Westphalia awarded her the prize in theatre literature.

=== New York and Los Angeles ===
In 2008, Čelan re-established Theater TAS in New York City with the performance and installation Yard Sale: New Footfalls... as its first production, presented by the arts organization chashama. She is a member of PEN American Center.

The Theater TAS production of Rainer Werner Fassbinder's play "Blood on the Cat's Neck" directed by Čelan was presented in March 2014 by the Goethe-Institut LA as a multimedia theater and film performance. On June 28, 2014, the Max Kade Institute at the University of Southern California hosted the multimedia reading of Čelan's play "Woyzeck von Sarajevo" under her direction.

== Works ==
Čelan's plays have been performed on the German radio and in theatres. In addition to her own plays, such as The Last Story, Woyzeck from Sarajevo (both translated into English) and Struwwelpit & Co., she has directed twenty plays by classical authors, including Anton Chekhov, William Shakespeare, Edward Albee, Franz Kafka, Sophocles, and Samuel Beckett, in her theatre. Her works have been published in English, German and Serbo-Croatian. Čelan has translated texts written by Sylvia Plath, Leonid Andreyev and Isak Samokovlija among others.

=== Drama ===
- The Death of Omer & Merima
- The Royal Marine
- The King’s Murderers
- Heimatbuch (Homeland Book)
- Commedia Goldoniana
- The Last Story (translated into English)
- Chekhov
- Woyzeck from Sarajevo (translated into English)
- Felix
- Cabaret International
- The Struwwelpit & Co. (in collaboration with Maria Fuß)
- Picollo Fratello Francesco

=== Other ===
- Woyzeck from Sarajevo (radio play)
- Clean Hands (book)

== Awards ==
- Best Young Actress in SR Bosnia and Herzegovina
- Yugoslavian Award for Avant-garde Arts
- Best Director Award at the Avant-garde Theatre Festival in SR Montenegro
- Dramatist Award of the Bund der Theatergemeinden (Alliance of the German Theatre Community) for the best German-language play for her play Heimatbuch (Homeland Book), 1995
- Kristal Vilenice, International Literature Award for Poetry, for her book Me and You – Book of Love Poetry, 1996
- Artist Award of the Cultural Minister of the State of North Rhine-Westphalia (NRW) in the field of Theatre Literature, 1997
