= Zmajevo =

Zmajevo Змајево (Serbian) Ókér (Hungarian)
- Village (Selo)
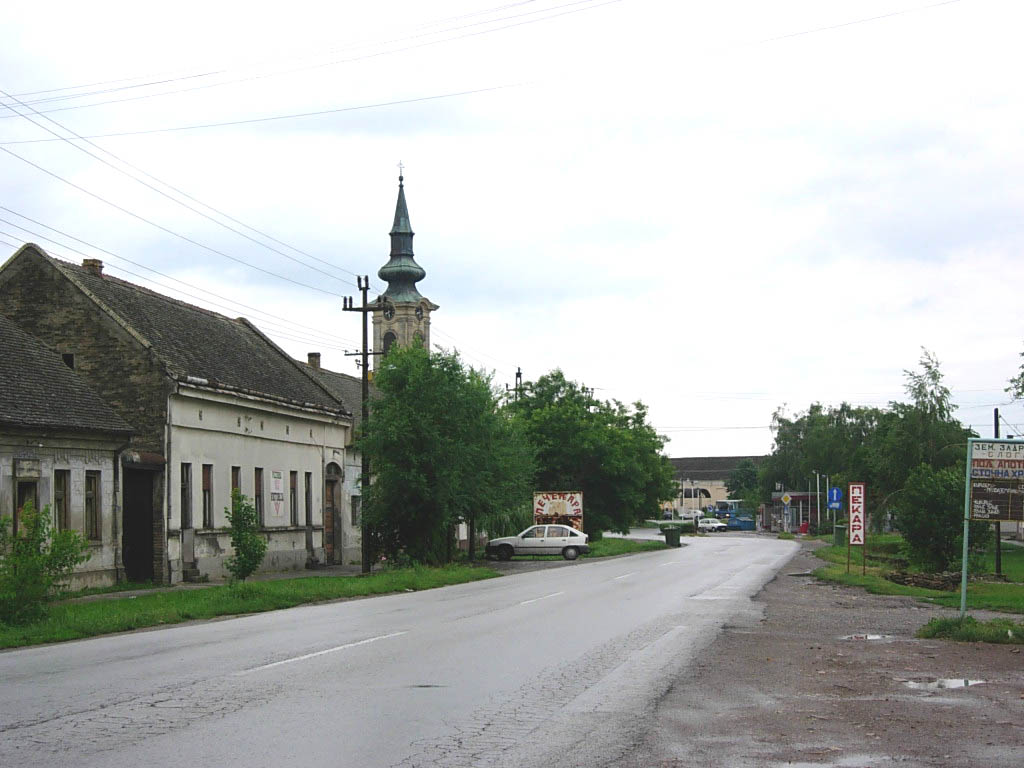
- The Orthodox church.

- Location within Vojvodina Location within Serbia Location within Europe
- Coordinates: 45°27′N 19°41′E
- Country: Serbia
- Province: Vojvodina
- Region: Bačka (Podunavlje)
- District: South Bačka
- Municipality: Vrbas

Population (2002)
  - Total: 4,361
- Time zone: UTC+1 (CET)
  - Summer (DST): UTC+2 (CEST)

Zmajevo (Serbian Cyrillic: Змајево; Hungarian: Ókér) is a village in Serbia. It is situated in the Vrbas municipality, in the South Bačka District, Vojvodina province. The village has a Serb ethnic majority and its population numbering 4,361 people (2002 census). It has lakes that are full of carp (Zmajevacka jezera) and a large hunting ground with many wild animals. Anglers from all over Serbia come to Zmajevo to fish the carp in Vojvodina.

== Name ==
In Serbian, the village is known as Zmajevo (Змајево), in German as Alt-Keer or Altker, and in Hungarian as Ókér (Kér was the name of one of the Hungarian tribes that occupied this territory). Older Serbian names (that were given to the village only after the end of the First World War) were: Pašićevo (Пашићево), Stari Ker (Стари Кер), Ker (Кер), and Bačka Dobra (Бачка Добра). The current name, Zmajevo, derived from nickname of Serbian poet Jovan Jovanović Zmaj.

== History ==
It was recorded first in 1267. During Ottoman rule (16th-17th century), the village of Kér was populated by Serbs. Germans settled in the village in 1787, but after World War II, as a consequence of the war events, the German population (approximately 2,500 people) was exiled from the village by the communist government. The German Evangelical church was torn down and the German cemetery turned into a pheasant-farm.

== Ethnic groups (2002 census) ==
- Serbs = 3,177 (72.85%)
- Montenegrins = 435 (9.98%)
- Hungarians = 306 (7.02%)
- others.

== Historical population ==
- 1961: 5,212
- 1971: 4,859
- 1981: 4,773
- 1991: 4,548
- 2002: 4,361

== See also ==
- List of places in Serbia
- List of cities, towns and villages in Vojvodina

== Gallery ==
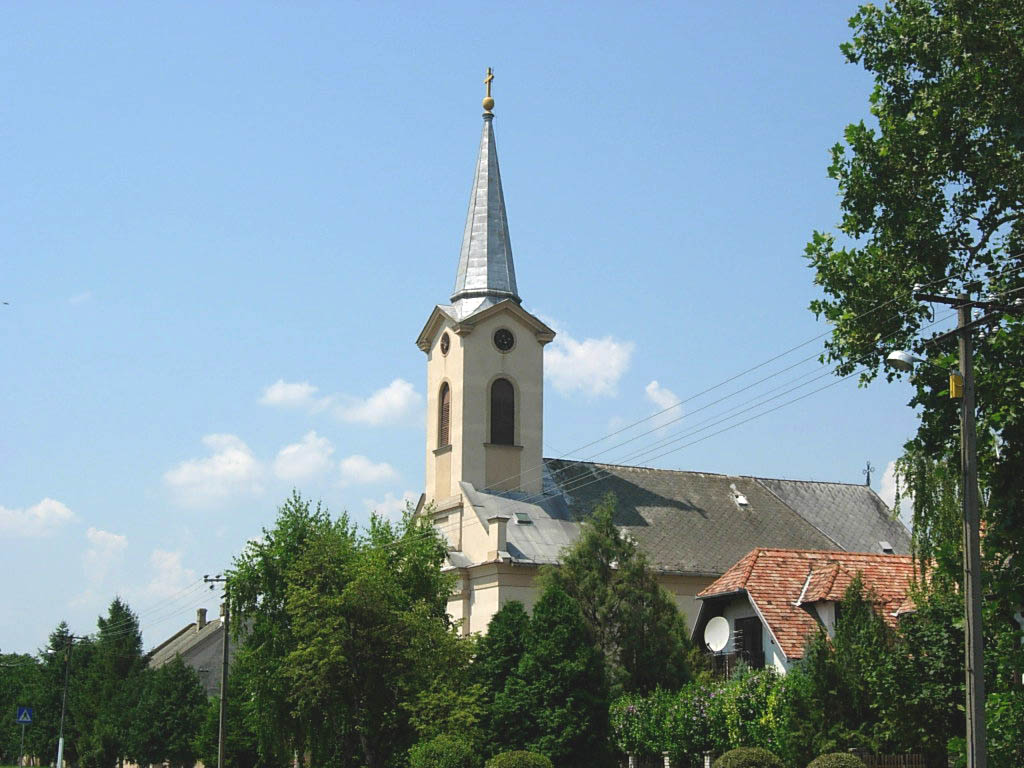
Saint Michael the Archangel Catholic Church.

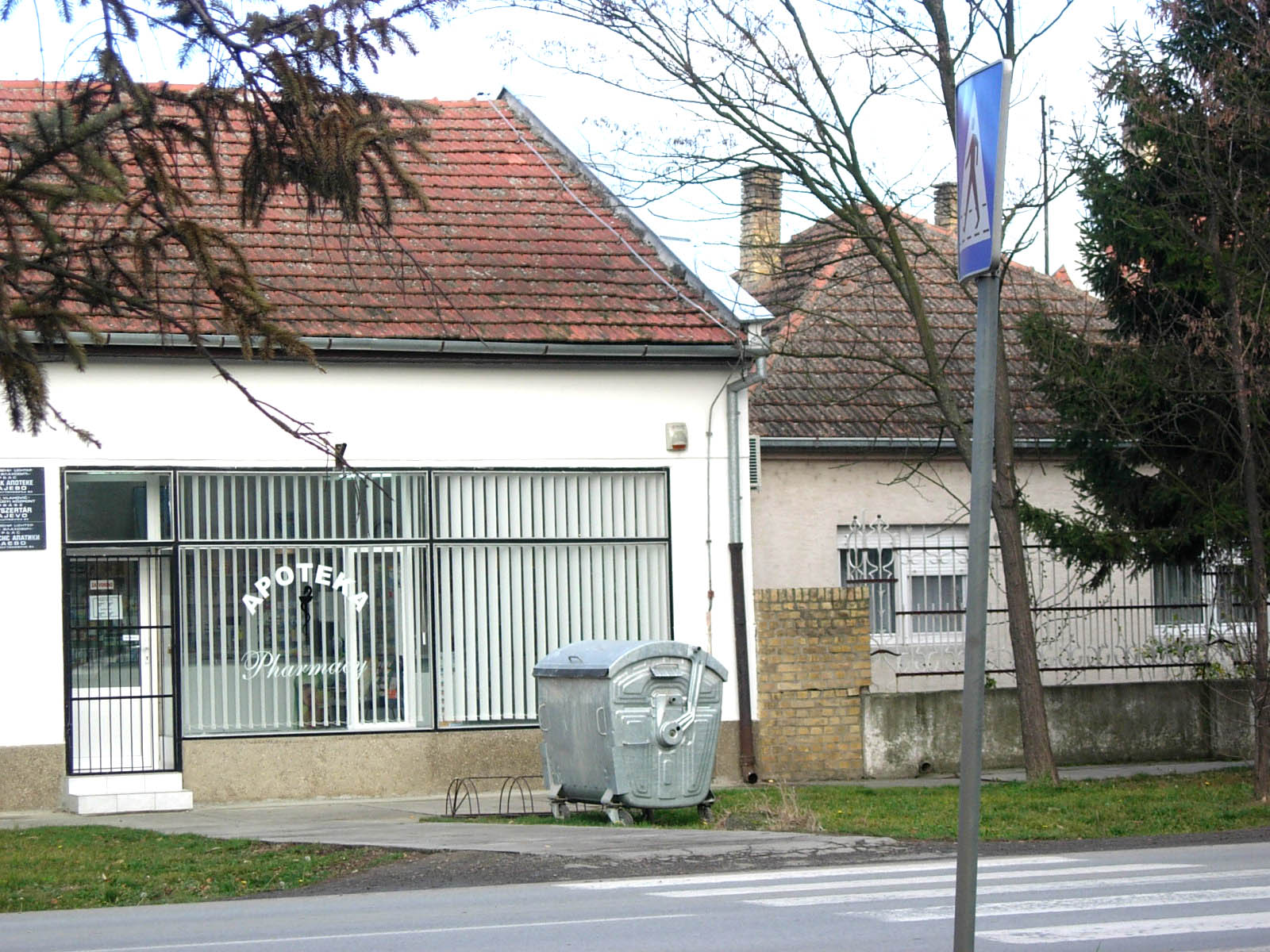
Pharmacy in the village.
