= Rumenka =

Rumenka Руменка (Serbian)
- Suburban settlement
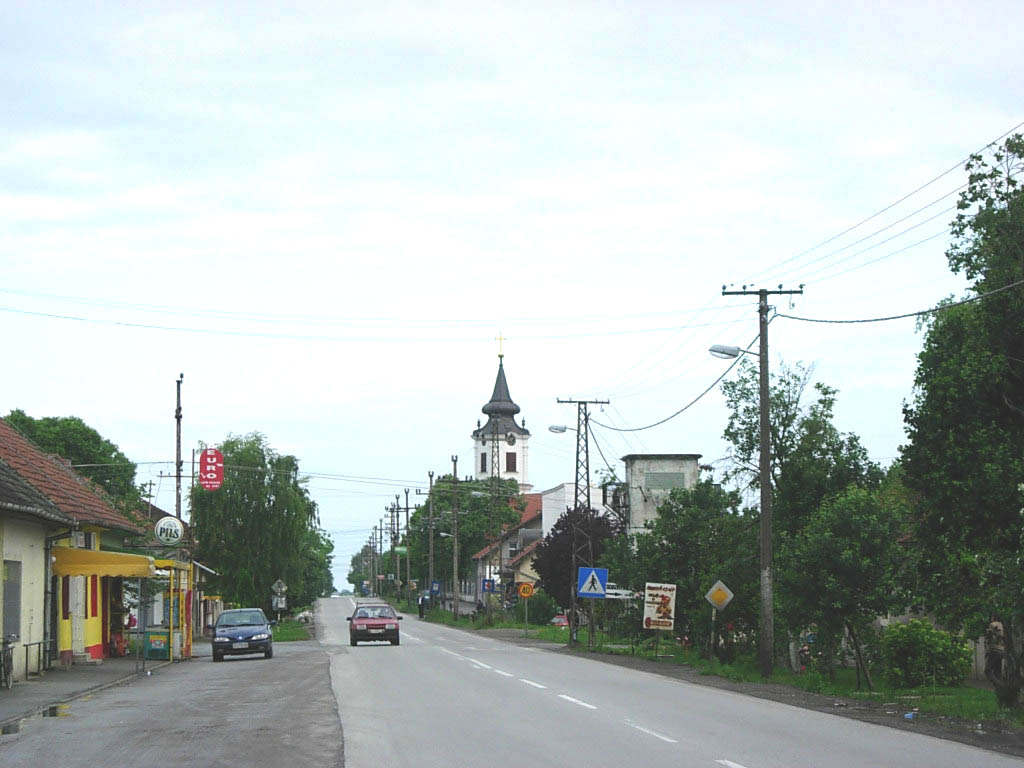
- Rumenka

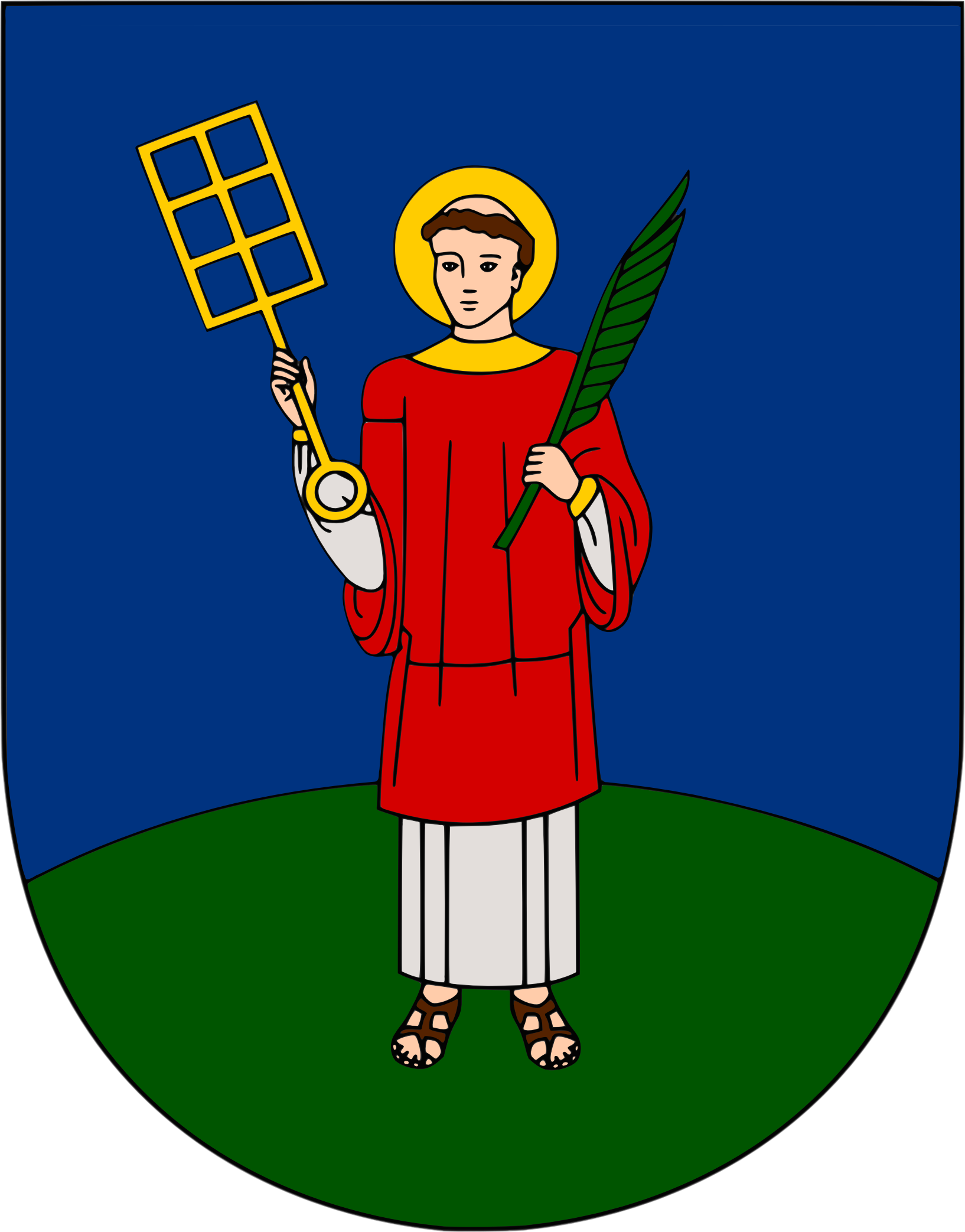
- Coat of arms

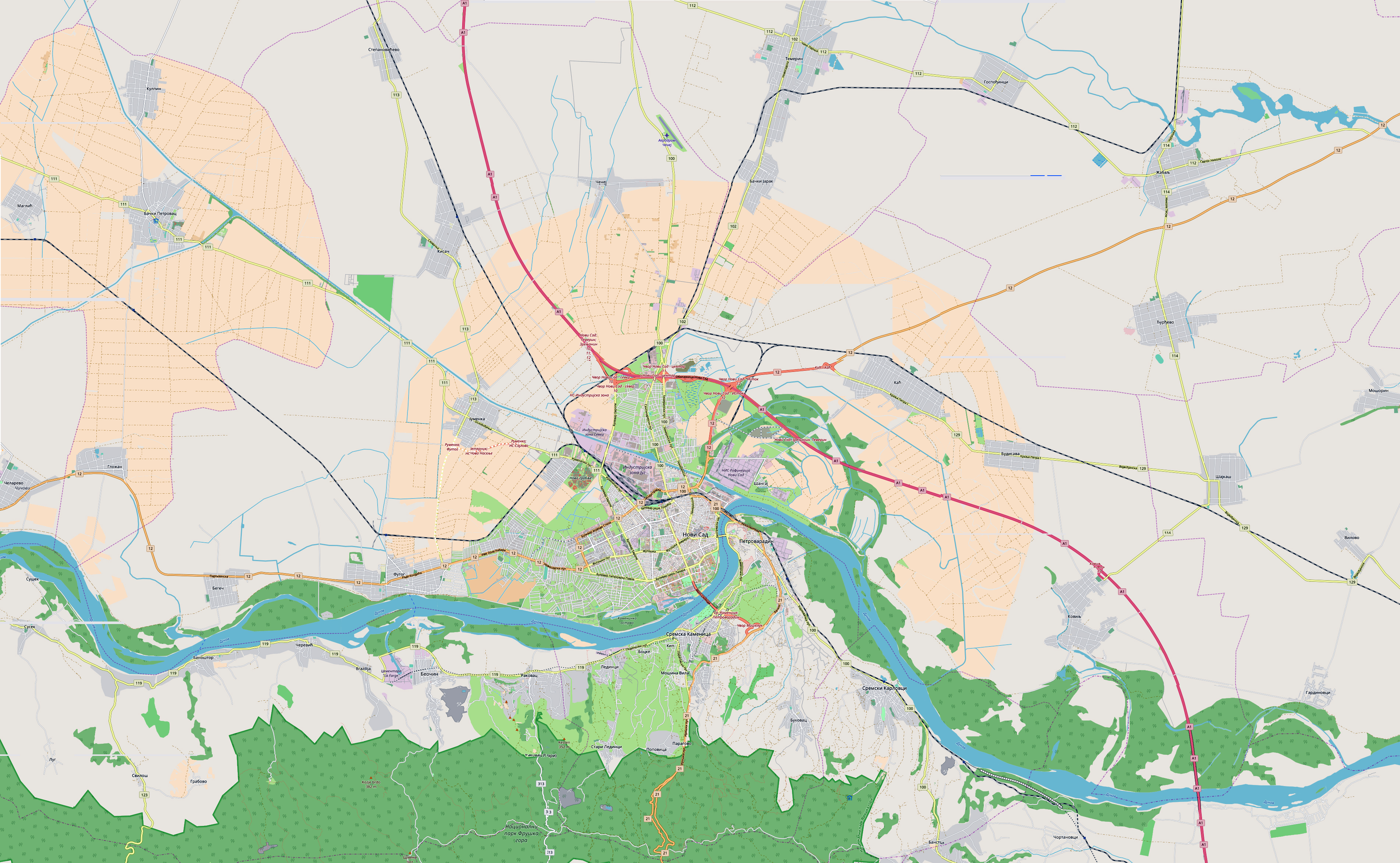
- Location within Novi Sad Rumenka (Vojvodina) Rumenka (Serbia)
- Coordinates: 45°18′N 19°45′E
- Country: Serbia
- Province: Vojvodina
- District: South Bačka
- Municipality: Novi Sad

Area
  - Total: 28.55 km^{2} (11.02 sq mi)

Population (2011)
  - Total: 6,495
  - Density: 227.5/km^{2} (589.2/sq mi)
- Time zone: UTC+1 (CET)
  - Summer (DST): UTC+2 (CEST)
- Area code: +381(0)21
- Car plates: NS

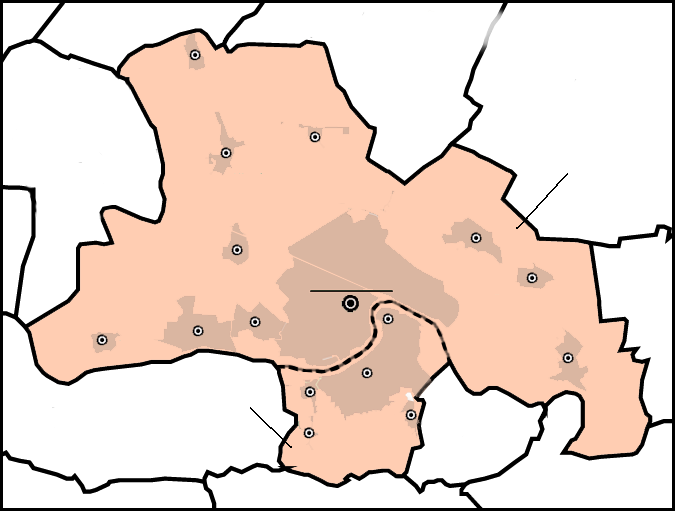

Rumenka (Serbian Cyrillic: Руменка) is a suburban settlement of the city of Novi Sad, Serbia. The village has a Serb ethnic majority and a population of 6,495 people (2011 census).

== Name ==
In Serbian and Croatian, the village is known as Rumenka (Руменка), and in Hungarian as Piros or Piross.

The story about origin of the name of Rumenka claim that in the early years of existence of the village, the land contained many red flowers and when looked upon from a distance Rumenka looked like a red field. Therefore, it was named "Rumenka" in Serbian (the name came from the word "rumen", meaning "red" in Serbian) or "Piros" in Hungarian (word that also meaning "red").

== History and culture ==
It was first mentioned in 1237. During the Ottoman rule, in 1590, the population of the village numbered 20 houses. In this time, Rumenka was populated by Serbs. There is a Serbian Orthodox Church of Saints Peter and Paul that was built after 1849 uprising, because the old one dating way back was destroyed, a Reformate Church was built in 1836( it is the third in the row) and a Parish house (built in 1780) in the village.

== Demographics ==
Historical population
Year	Pop.	±%
1948	1,951	—
1953	2,028	+3.9%
1961	2,546	+25.5%
1971	2,906	+14.1%
1981	3,629	+24.9%
1991	4,361	+20.2%
2001	5,729	+31.4%
2011	6,495	+13.4%
Source: Census

== Features ==
Rumenka is located near the Danube-Tisa-Danube channel. Although Rumenka is located near Novi Sad, the largest city in Vojvodina, the main branch of industry in the village is farming.

== Gallery ==
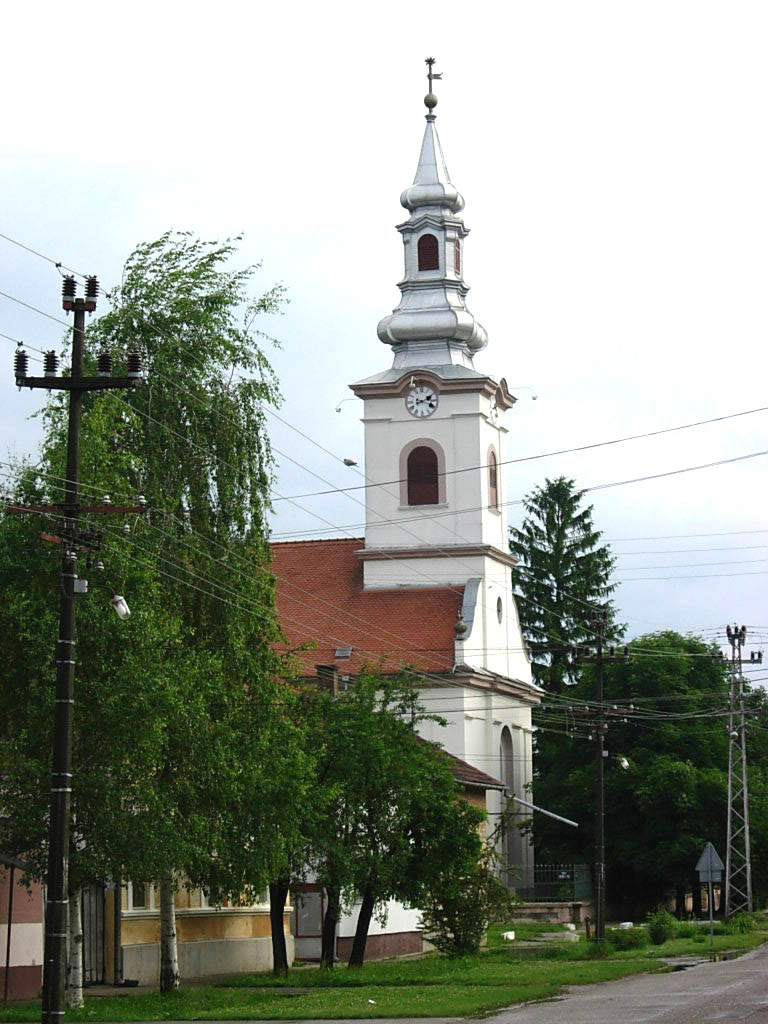
The Calvinist Church

== See also ==
- List of places in Serbia
- List of cities, towns and villages in Vojvodina
