= Despotovo =

Despotovo Деспотово (Serbian)
- Village (Selo)
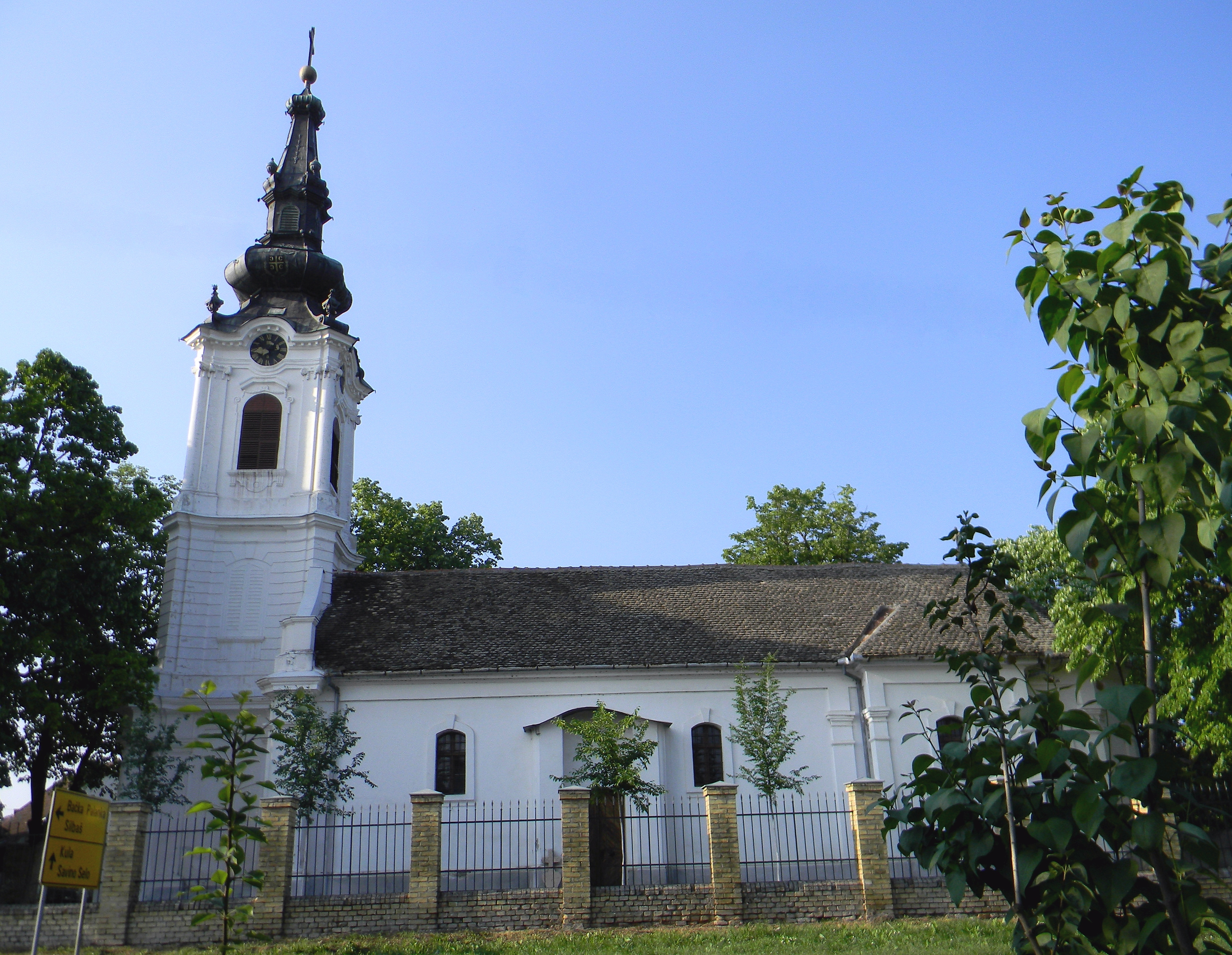
- The Orthodox Church

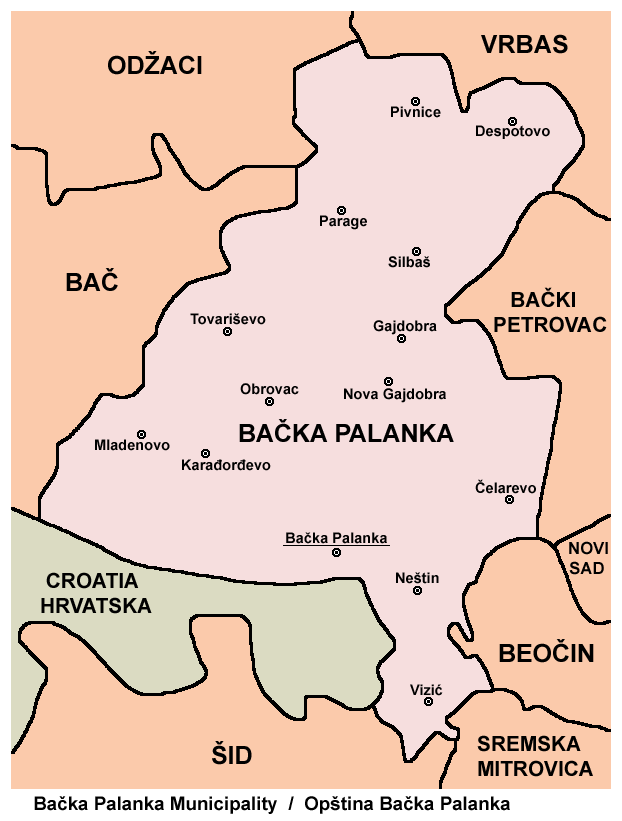
- Map of the Bačka Palanka municipality, showing the location of Despotovo.

- Location within Vojvodina Location within Serbia Location within Europe
- Coordinates: 45°27′N 19°13′E
- Country: Serbia
- Province: Vojvodina
- Region: Bačka
- District: South Bačka
- Municipality: Bačka Palanka
- Time zone: UTC+1 (CET)
  - Summer (DST): UTC+2 (CEST)

Despotovo (Serbian Cyrillic: Деспотово) is a village located in the Bačka Palanka municipality, in the South Bačka District of Serbia. It is situated in the autonomous province of Vojvodina. Despotovo had a total population of 2,081 inhabitants in 1991 and 2,096 in 2002. Most of the inhabitants of the village are ethnic Serbs.

== Name of the village ==
During its history, Despotovo has had several names in various languages. In the Middle Ages the village was called Sentivan (Сентиван) in Serbian. In the second half of the 13th century it was called Kesi-selo (Кеси-село). By 1418, the Serbs called it Despot Sentivan (Деспот Сентиван). It was named by Despot Jovan Branković. After World War I, when village became part of the Kingdom of Yugoslavia, it was named Despot Sveti Ivan (Деспот Свети Иван, English: Despot Saint John). After World War II it changed name to Vasiljevo (Васиљево), because of Soviet soldier Vasilj who was the first soldier who entered the village after the German army abandoned it. After a few years it became known as Novo Vasiljevo (Ново Васиљево), and then, finally, Despotovo (Деспотово).

In Hungarian, the village was called Szentivankeszi in the second half of the 13th century (presumably because the family who owned it were the Sentivanji). Hungarians later accepted Serbian name Despot Sentivan and they called it like that from the 16th century to the 18th. In the 15th and 16th centuries, Hungarians called it Edzasszentivan and Kisszentivan. In 1904 Hungarians called the village Ursentivan.

== History ==
Despotovo is one of the oldest villages in Bačka. When the Ottomans conquered Vojvodina many people left the village. Because of the many wars between the Habsburg monarchy and the Ottoman Empire, the village's population changed a lot from the 16th century to the 18th century, although it was mainly populated by Serbs during the Ottoman rule. After the Habsburgs defeated the Ottomans, Serbs started settling in Despotovo again. The village's first school opened in the 1770s and its church was built in 1786.

== Demographics ==
=== 1991 ===
According to the 1991 census, Despotovo had a total population of 2,081 inhabitants, comprising:

- Serbs = 1,793 (86.16%)
- Croats = 68 (3.27%)
- Yugoslavs = 63 (3.03%)
- Slovaks = 40 (1.92%)
- ethnic Muslims = 18 (0.86%)
- Romani = 17 (0.82%)
- Hungarians = 15 (0.72%)
- Rusyns = 14 (0.67%)
- Montenegrins = 11 (0.53%)
- Germans = 6 (0.23%)
- Others = 36 (1.73%)

=== 2002 ===
In 2002, the population of the village numbered 2,096 people, including:

- 1,863 Serbs
- 46 Slovaks
- 43 Croats
- 31 Yugoslavs
- 19 Hungarians
- 17 Romani
- 12 Rusyns
- 10 ethnic Muslims
- others.

== Historical population ==
- 1961: 2,396
- 1971: 2,402
- 1981: 2,150
- 1991: 2,081
- 2011: 1,844

== See also ==
- Bačka Palanka
- South Bačka District
- Bačka
- List of places in Serbia
- List of cities, towns and villages in Vojvodina
