= Odžaci =

Odžaci Оџаци (Serbian) Hódság (Hungarian) Odžaci (Slovak)
- Town and municipality
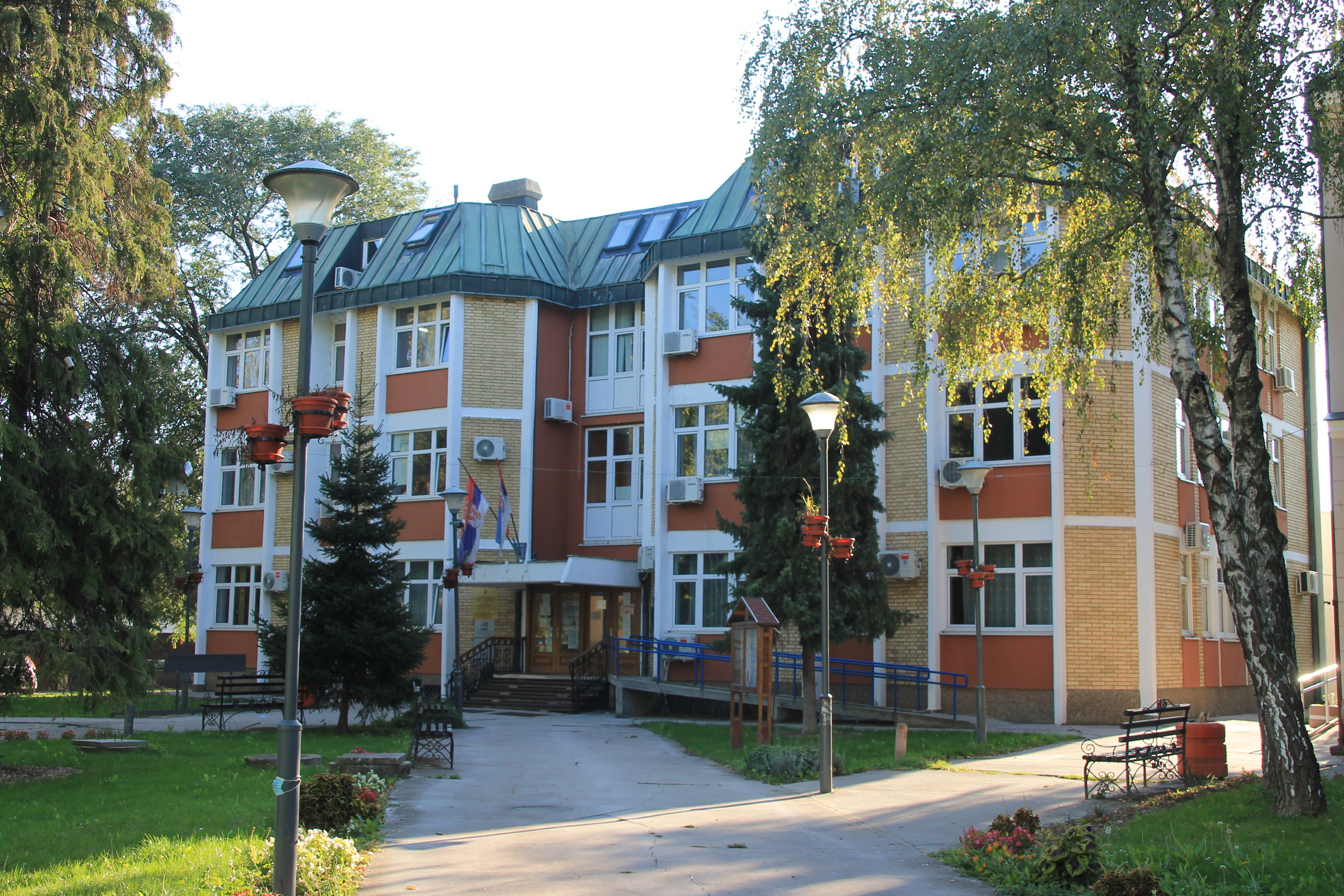
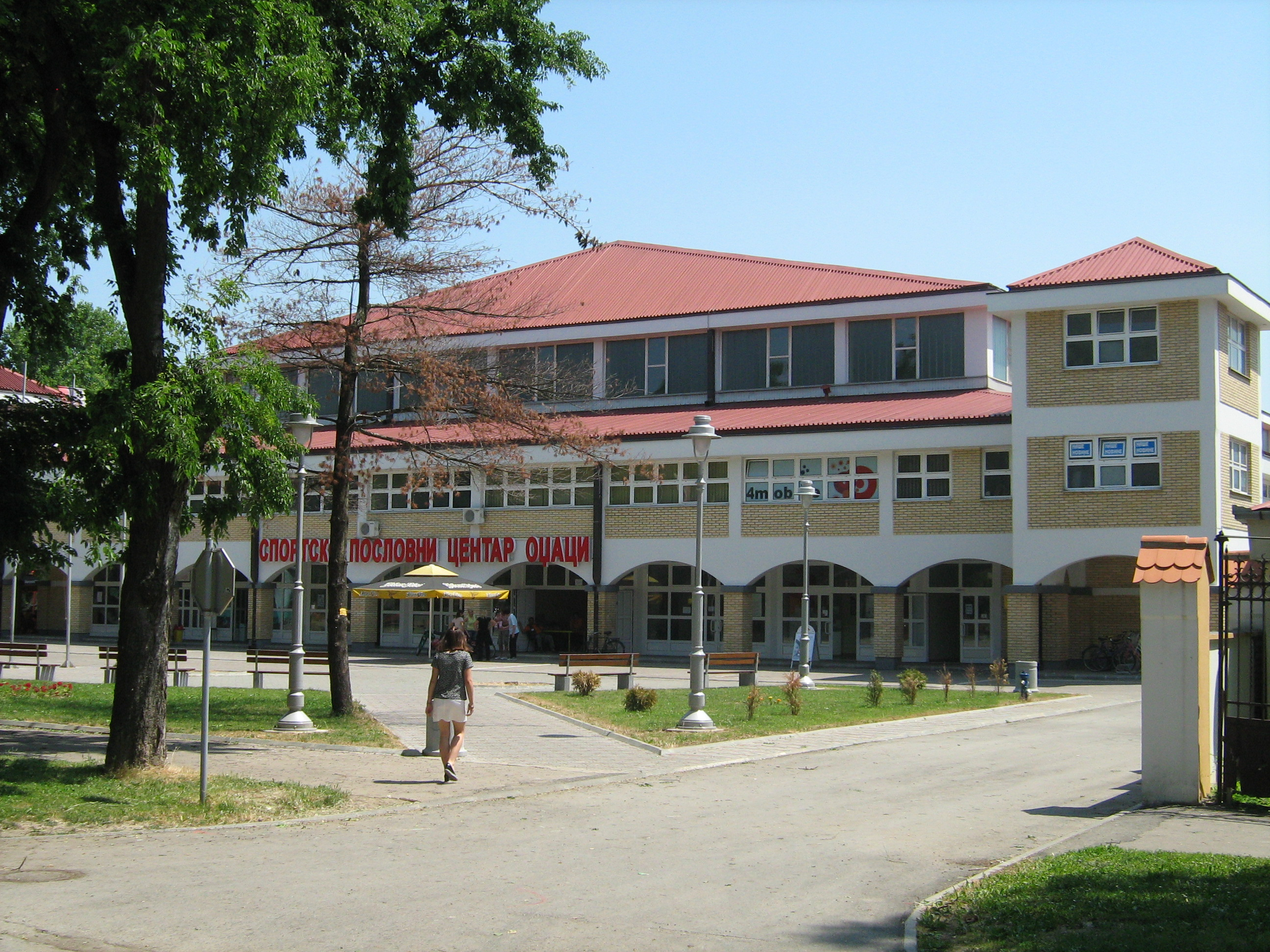
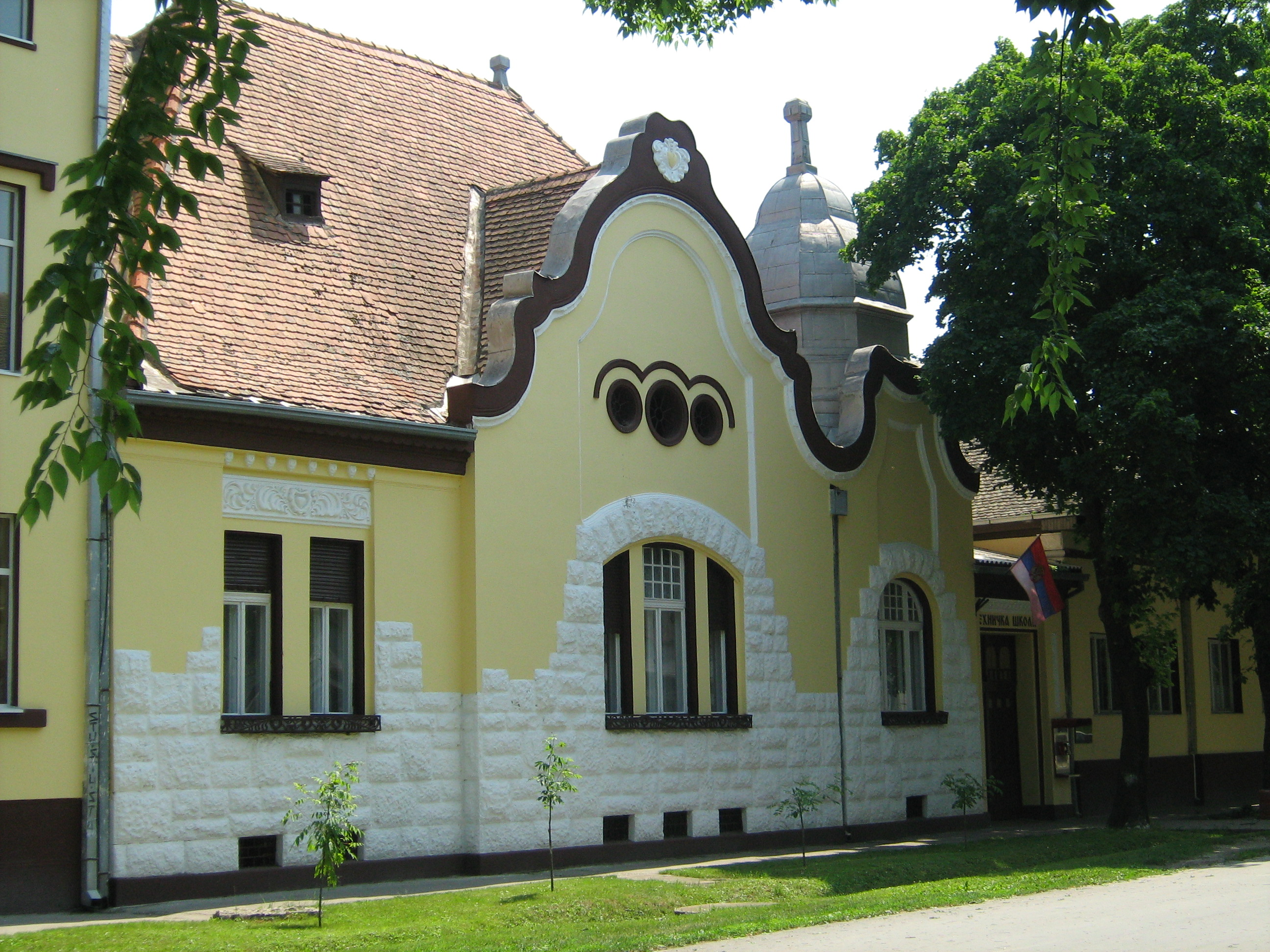
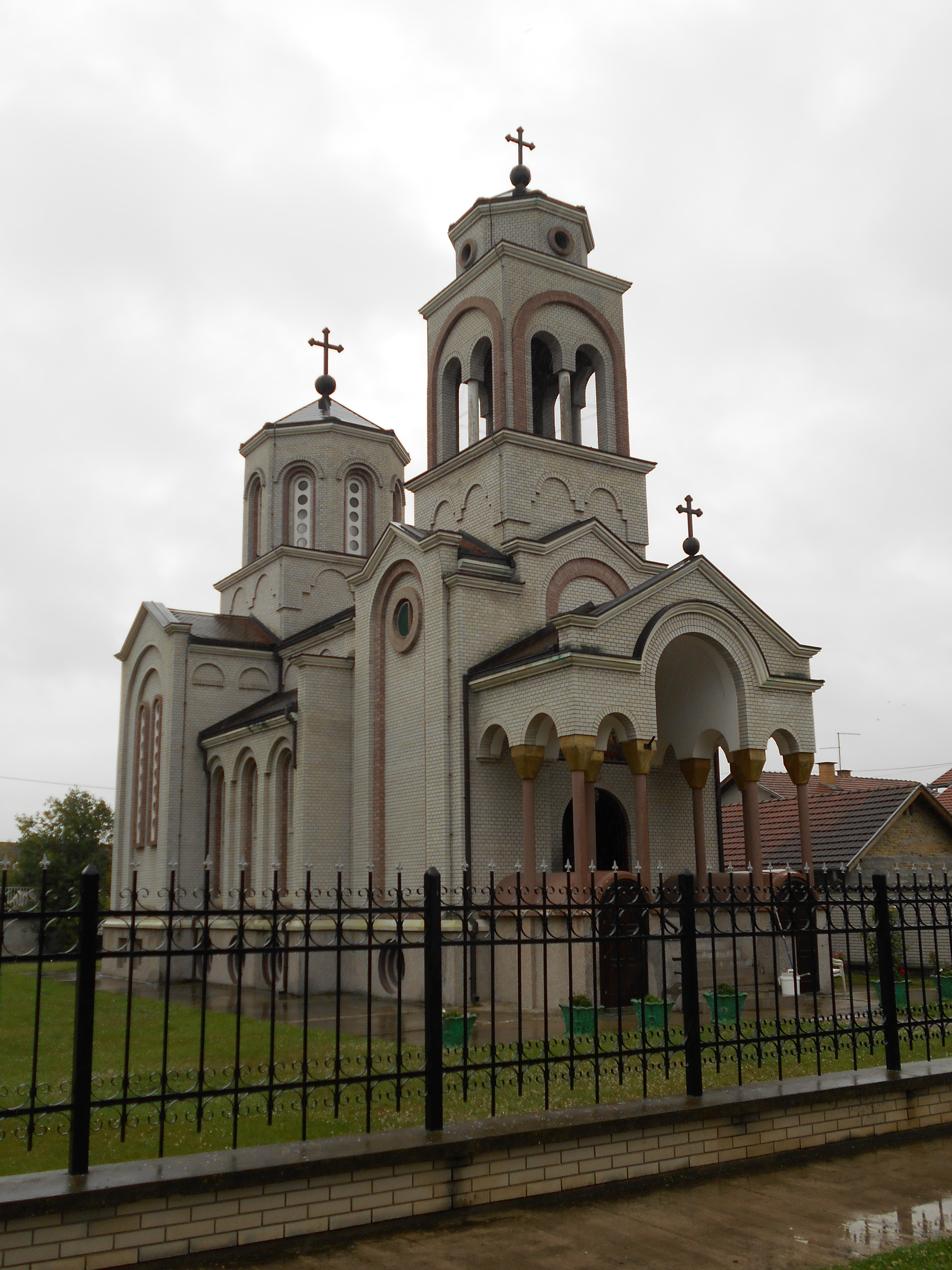
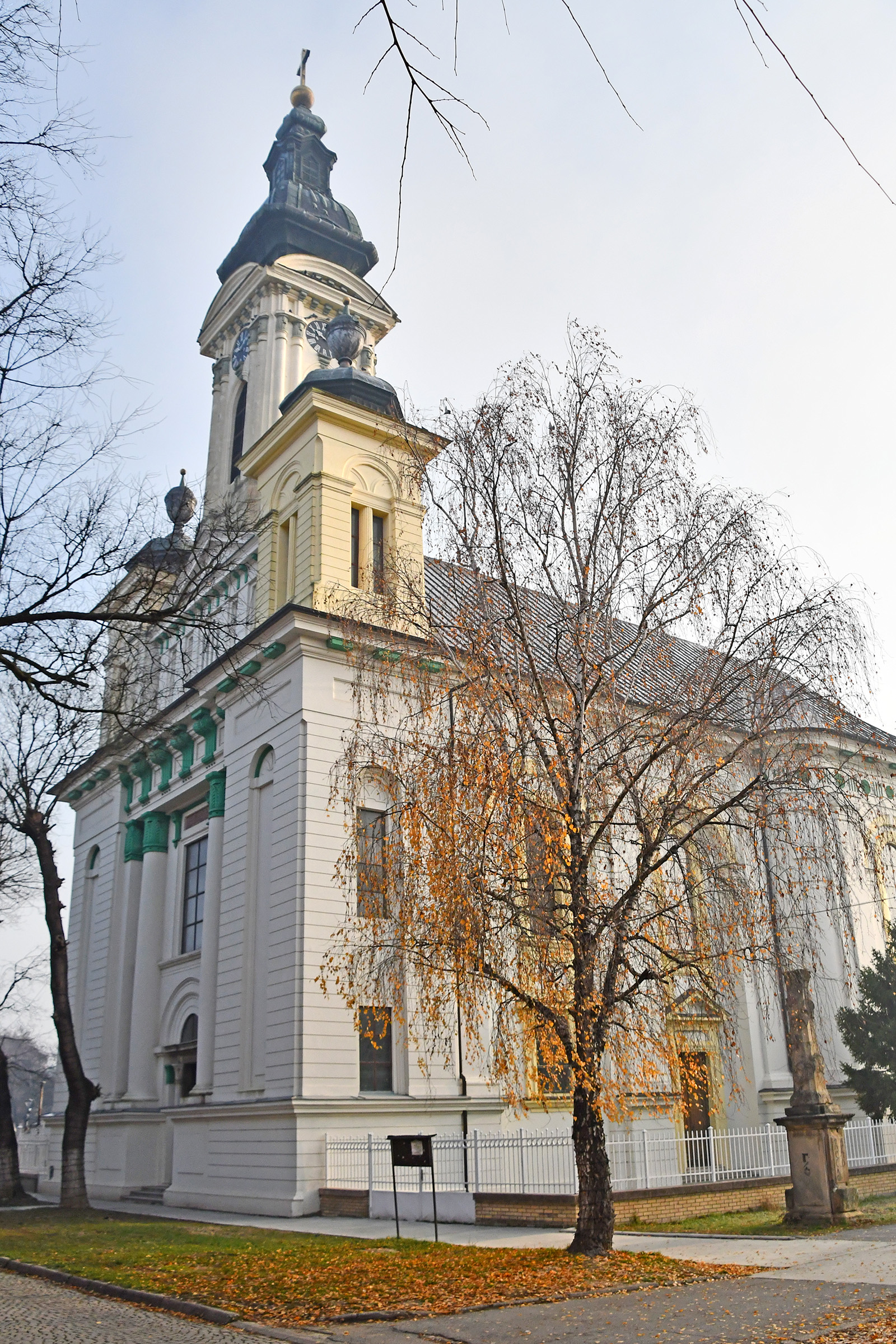
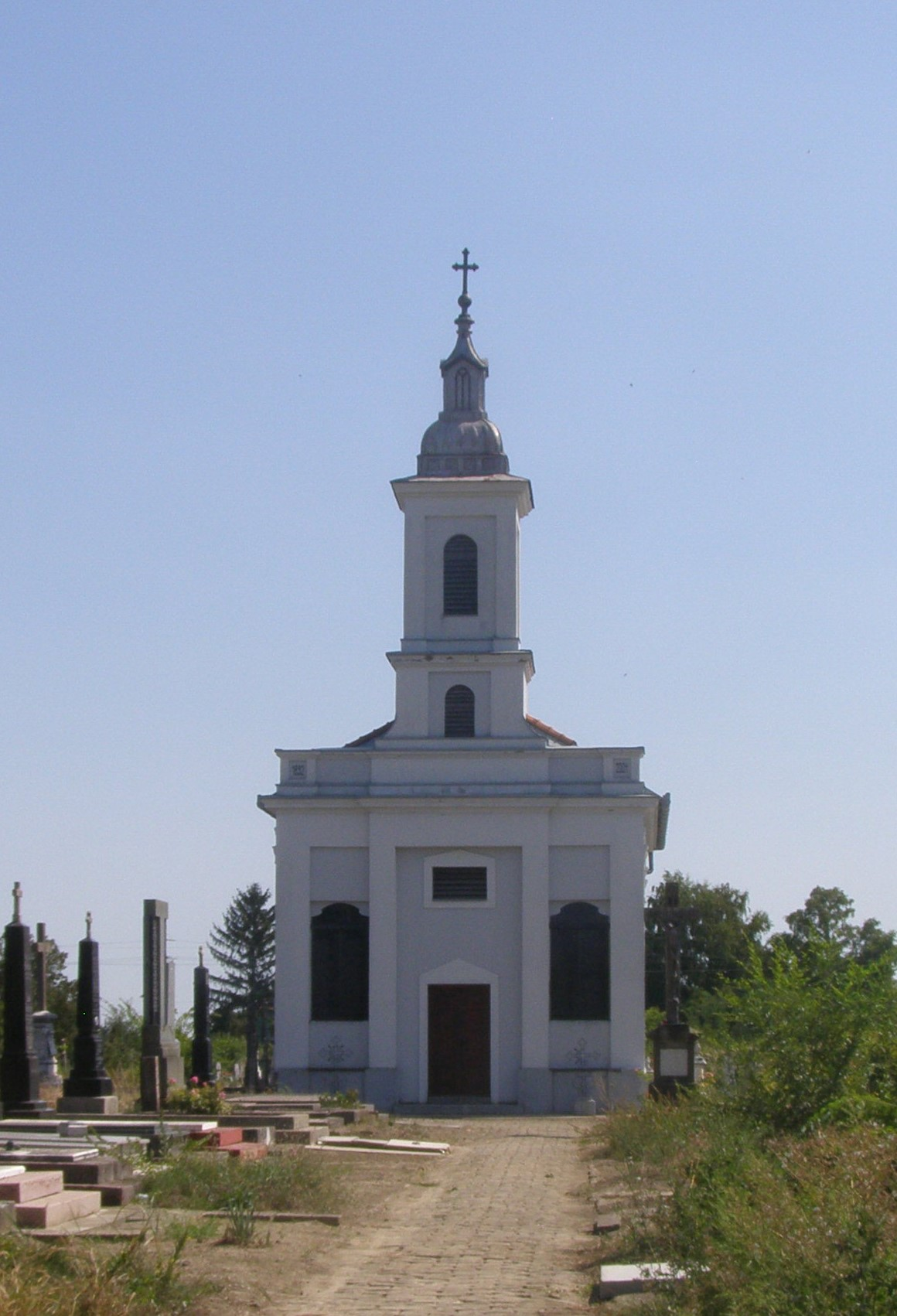
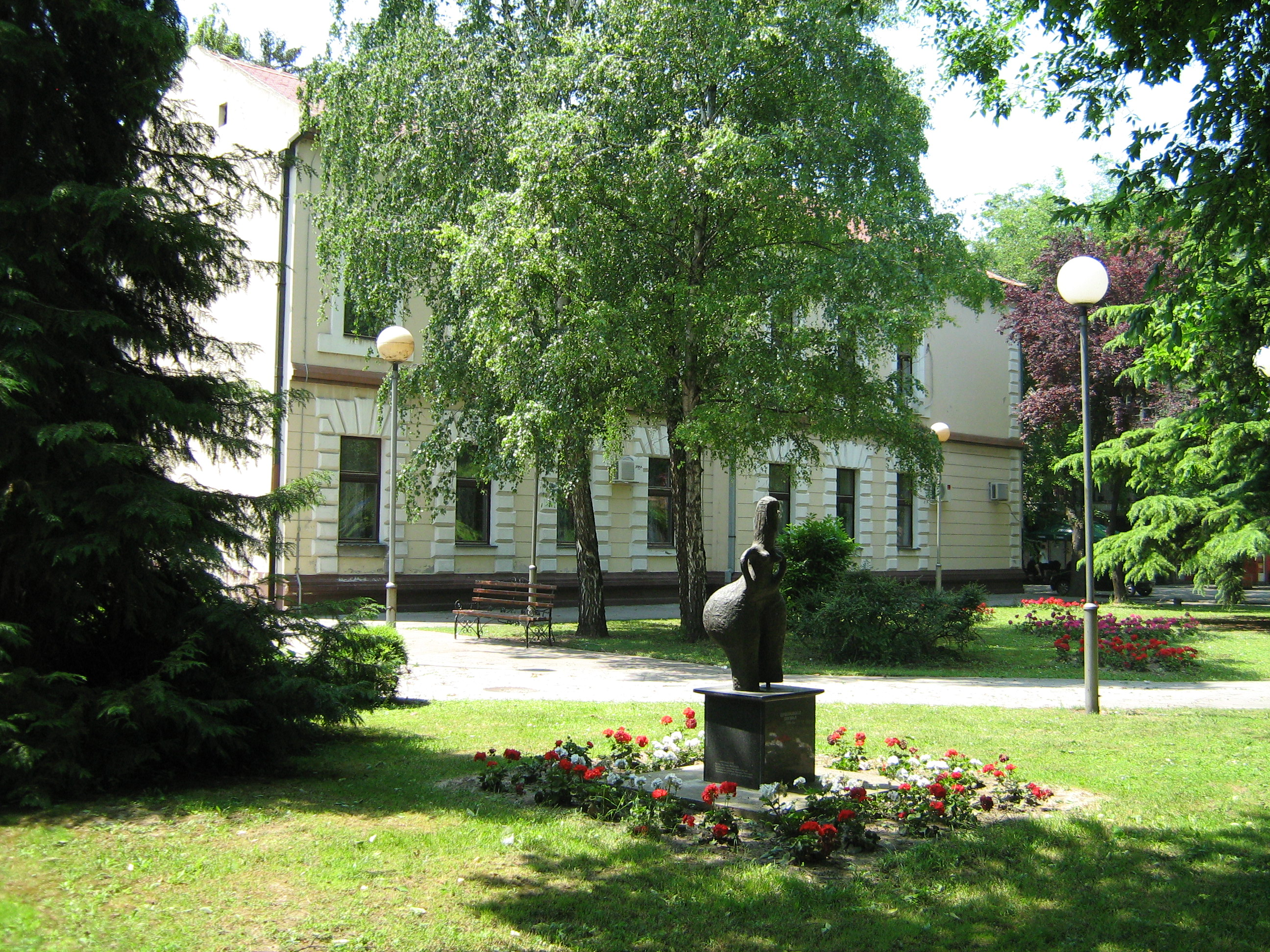
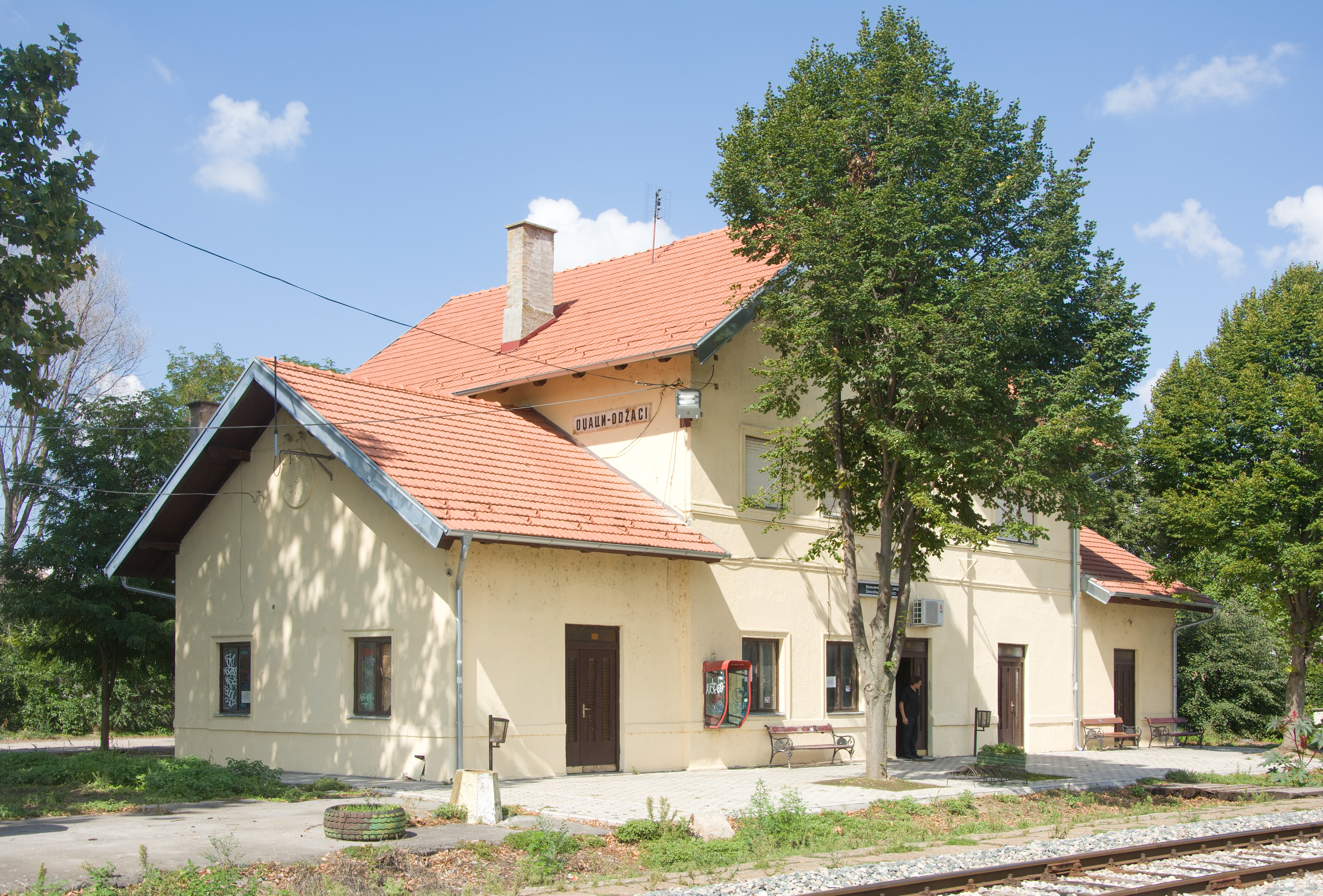
- Odžaci Town Hall Odžaci Sports and Business Centre Ertl Villa Church of St. Sava Church of Archangel Michael Odžaci Cemetery Chapel Red-haired Goddess Statue Odžaci Railway Station

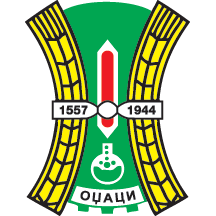
- Coat of arms

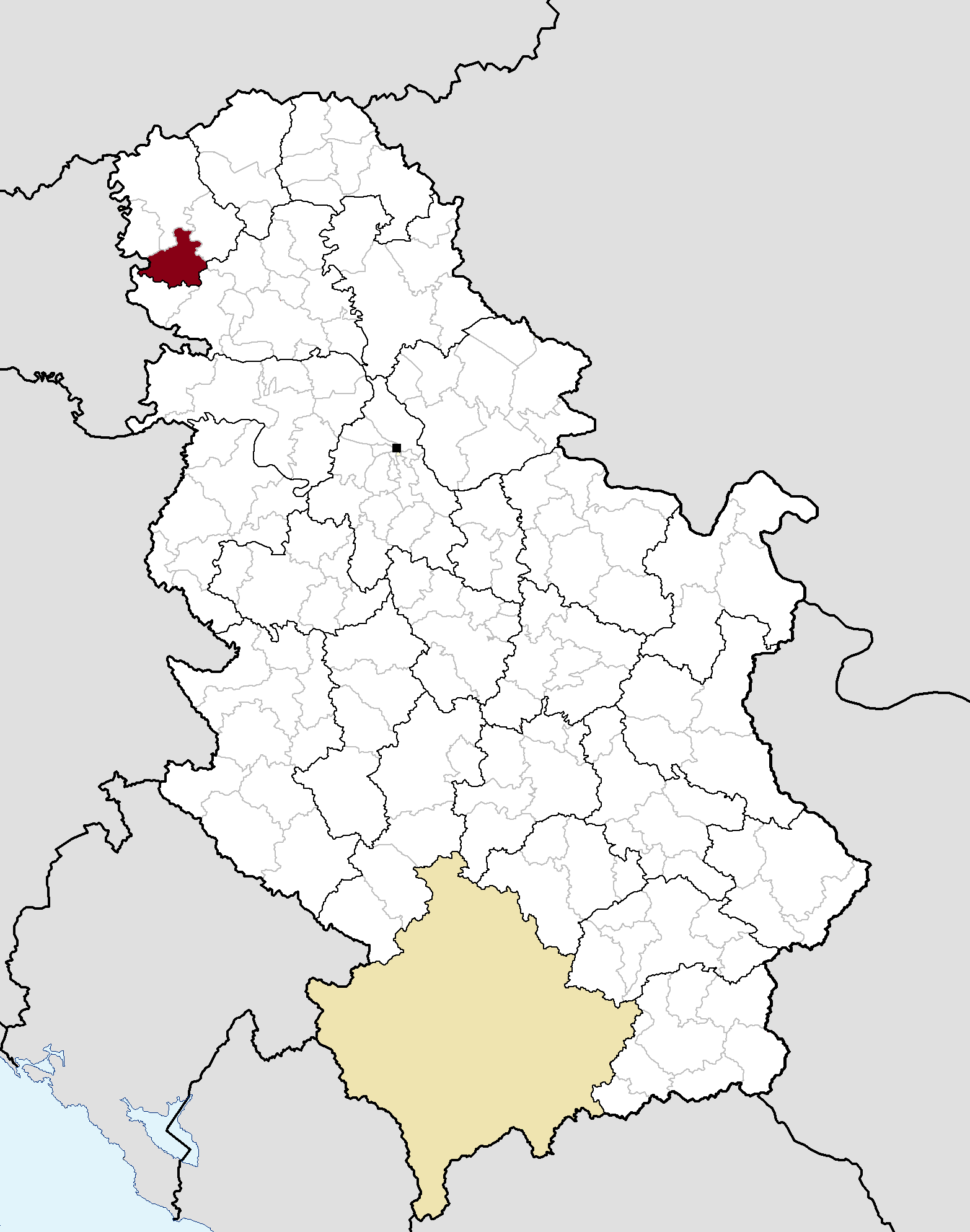
- Location of the municipality of Odžaci within Serbia
- Coordinates: 45°31′N 19°16′E
- Country: Serbia
- Province: Vojvodina
- Region: Bačka
- District: West Bačka
- Municipality: Odžaci
- Settlements: 9

Government
  - Mayor: Goran Nikolić (SNS)

Area
  - Town: 48.27 km^{2} (18.64 sq mi)
  - Municipality: 411.06 km^{2} (158.71 sq mi)
- Elevation: 87 m (285 ft)

Population (2022 census)
  - Town: 7,556
  - Town density: 156.5/km^{2} (405.4/sq mi)
  - Municipality: 24,926
  - Municipality density: 60.638/km^{2} (157.05/sq mi)
- Time zone: UTC+1 (CET)
  - Summer (DST): UTC+2 (CEST)
- Postal code: 25250
- Area code: +381 25
- Car plates: SO
- Official languages: Serbian together with Hungarian and Slovak
- Website: www.odzaci.rs

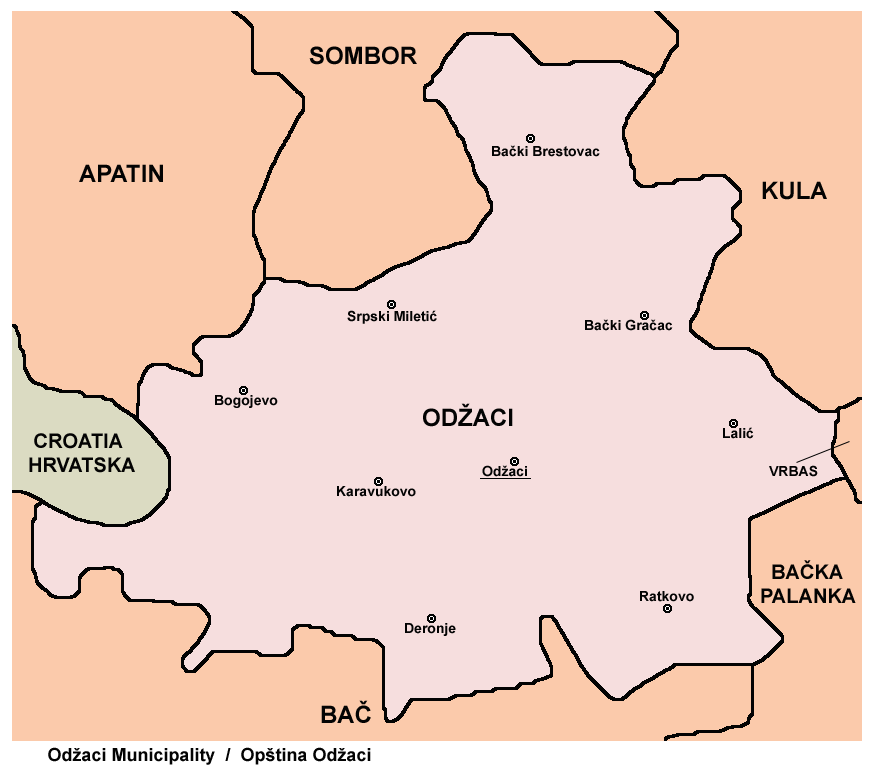
Map of Odžaci municipality

Odžaci (Serbian Cyrillic: Оџаци, pronounced [ˈǒdʒat͜si]; Hungarian: Hódság) is a town and municipality located in the West Bačka District of the autonomous province of Vojvodina, Serbia. The town of Odžaci has a population of 7,556 people, while the population of the municipality of Odžaci is 24,926 people (2022 census).

== Name ==
The name Odžaci / Оџаци means "chimneys" in Serbian. Formerly, the settlement was also known as Odžak / Оџак ("chimney"), which is retained in Pannonian Rusyn as Оджак. The Slavic/Serbian word "odžak" (or plural "odžaci") is a modification of the Turkish word "Ocak" (bearing the same pronunciation), meaning "fireplace".

In Croatian, the town is also known as Odžaci, in Hungarian as Hódság, and in German as Hodschag.

The old Hungarian name of the settlement was "Kéménd", first mentioned in 1522, and meaning "with chimney". Derived from the aforementioned Serbian word "Odžak" was the new Hungarian name "Hódság" (also later called "Hódsági Járás" (Hódsági district)), as well as the German name "Hodschag".

== Geography ==
Municipality of Odžaci is located in the west part of Bačka, on the left coast of the river Danube in length of 9.5km. The territory belongs to the West Bačka district, AP Vojvodina, Republic of Serbia. It is surrounded by the municipalities of Apatin, Sombor, Kula, Vrbas, Bačka Palanka, Bač and on Danube is bordered with Republic of Croatia.

The territory of municipality of Odžaci covers an area of 41,115.89 hectares. It consists of 9 Cadastral municipalities: Odžaci, Bački Gračac, Bački Brestovac, Srpski Miletić, Bogojevo, Karavukovo, Deronje, Ratkovo and Lalić, which are at the same time settlements.

By size of the territory, municipality of Odžaci is one of the smallest municipalities in the scope of Vojvodina. The municipality center, settlement Odžaci, is located in the middle of the municipality's territory, whereas the other settlements are radially staggered around the municipality's center.

=== Relief ===
Odžaci municipality region is characterized by vast and wide plain land. The ground is below the sea level near the Danube whose great hydrological activity created numerous depressions and bogs. The area between Srpski Miletić and Bogojevo is made up of “slatina” or saline soil, and a certain number of protected plants have found their home on the solonetz soil. Because of its overall importance it is expected that the whole area will be proclaimed as protected. As of 2025, a proposal to designate the area as a protected landscape ("Predeo izuzetnih odlika Srednja Mostonga") had completed its public consultation process in December 2024, but had not yet been formally adopted by the Assembly of Vojvodina.

=== Climate ===
Climate in Odžaci municipality can be described as moderate-continental. The average annual temperature is 10.9°C. The coldest month is January with -0.3°C, while July is the warmest with 21.4°C. The total insolation per year is 2014 hours. Warm springs and summers provide favorable conditions for sports and recreation, including water sports and many other outdoor activities.

=== Hydrological features ===
Hydrological features of this region were created both by the activity of the Danube River and human work throughout the past and present. The part of the river that runs through Odžaci municipality is 10km long and is a valuable natural resource to the area. Between the Danube and a lowland forest, in the place where the river is bridged on its way towards Erdut in the neighboring Croatia, there are vacation homes and a small harbor with a number of river boats.

Further away from the Danube towards Bogojevo, a natural process of major flooding took place in the early twentieth century creating Strand Lake. Surrounded by tall poplars and sandy beaches, the lake is a local bathing resort and a picnic area. The formation of the lake is linked to the catastrophic flooding of 1926 when floodwater did not retreat. Smaller lakes surrounding Strand Lake do not have any affluents or offshoots that would provide clean water for swimming and recreational activities. Visitors have 2 ha of beach at their disposal.

The length of the canal network Danube-Tisa-Danube within municipal boundaries is 43km. The canals are connected to the Danube and navigable, being especially suitable for vessels with a capacity of 10-20 passengers. Small boats allow far easier and quicker maneuvering, docking at various locations, and even relatively easy transfer over short distances, or participation in various sports and recreational events. The water of the canal network is significantly purer compared to other parts of Backa.

The wetland area called Bogojevački Rit comprises a number of marshes, lakes and canals. One of the most beautiful is Holzer bog, surrounded by reeds, poplars and willows, a habitat of harmony and tranquility for its wealth of biodiversity. Bogojevački Rit is suitable for recreational activities, ecology and photography classes.

=== Fauna ===
Natural unit called Kamariste, which heavily relies on the Danube, provides a hunting ground of the same name. The habitat is favourable to deer and wild boar as well as many types of small game. The Hunting Lodge, famous for its distinctive architecture, is always at service to individuals interested in the natural resources of the area. Provala Lake, The Ziva Rivulet, Golic Islet and giant oak trees are just some of the natural features of Kamariste.

Branched canal network of the Danube-Tisa-Danube Channel, approximately 40km long, is a part of the hydrological system of Odžaci municipality. Calm water sailing and popular fishing (carp, pike, catfish, perch, carp, tench, etc.) reveal the true picture of natural resources of Odžaci municipality.

== History ==
=== Founding of Odžaci ===
Odžaci was first time mentioned in the year 1557 or 1558. It was mentioned as a settlement in Bačka established by the Turks in time of war operations which took place in south Hungary. There are a lot of theories of the name origin, one of them is that it originates from the name of the Turkish military unit which stayed there, another theory is that the name originates from the Turkish word for chimney ( because of the chimneys which were protruding from the dugout of the first settlement), and also that Odžaci got its name by the Bosnian Odžaci from where 7 Serbian families arrived in the 16th century. In the 17th century Odžaci was deserted, the population was under pressure of impost, charged for military and war needs, and it mainly moved up north. During the 18th century the settlement was restored and then in Odžaci lived about one hundred Serbian and families of Šokci. The Austro-Hungarian authorities decided to colonize this area with German colonists, which resulted with forced emigration of the indigenous population (Serbs and Šokci).

=== Arrival of German colonists ===
The colonization of Odžaci with German inhabitants started in 1755 when a decision for settling 300 German families was brought. The Austro-Hungarian authorities gave the German colonists land for building houses, as much land as they could cultivate, seed etc. Besides that, they got status of free imperial citizens, so the serfs among them were freed from their obligations. The colonists who inhabited Odžaci were mainly from the German areas: Baden, Schwarzwald, Alsace, Lorene, Hessen etc. They were arriving in their new habitat through Danube, with ships known by the name "Ulm boxes" they were sailing through Vienna and Budapest to Apatin where they were discharged. The first colonists arrived in 1756; among them was baron Kotman, property owner.

=== Odžaci - Capital of hemp ===
The main occupation of the colonists was agriculture. With their arrival a massive cultivation of hemp started, although by some Turkish notebooks the cultivation of hemp was mentioned even when they ruled with these areas. The land in Odžaci and around was ideal for growing these plants, with the help of the river Mostonoga that was frequently casting and flooding the surrounding area. Also, Mostonoga was ideal for plunging the hemp. The production was initiated by baron Kotman who informed Vienna that the hemp succeeds well on the territory of the new colonist settlements. He gathered the hemp producers, he provided them with work means and obliged to purchase from them 5000 cubits of fabric annually. The production got more massive and Odžaci became one of the biggest centers for hemp production in Europe. In 1779 hemp fair was held for the first time and eventually became more significant. In 1907 a factory for cultivation of hemp and production of ropes was open by the members of a wealthy family Ertl (Franc and Johan) by the example of a similar factory in Segedin. The factory had initial 200 workers but it advanced rapidly and in 1929 reached a number of 800 employed. Eventually the production expanded so besides ropes they produced: carpets, and since 1933 wool and silk fabric.

=== Development of Odžaci ===
With the immigration of the first colonists the vertiginous economic development of Odžaci which mostly relied on hemp production, was followed by social development of the area. In 1762 the first school on German language was established. The first church was built in 1764, but no trace was preserved. In 1818 a celebration was held with regard to laying the foundations of a new church which was finished in 1821. In 1813 Odžaci got the privilege to hold a weekly fair and two yearly trade fairs and it gained status of a marketplace. In 1871 the District Court was established, in 1879 the Property Registration Office, in 1884 the Office of Prince (First prince of Odžaci was Jozef Visi). The first printing office was established in 1887. In Odžaci in that period worked two money bureaus: Odžaci savings bank and Odžaci mutual aid cash, and in 1897 the IRS was established. In 1895 the construction of the railway Novi Sad-Baja which traverses Odžaci, was finished and in the same year the first train passed. In 1899 within the monastery in Odžaci, the first kinder garden was built and later was moved in a new modern building built by the owner of Hemp and cordage factory, Johan Ertl. In 1906 the firm "Ertl & Shverer" ( also partly owned by the family Ertl) opened the first power station for their mill needs and that brought to electrification of the area. In 1911 a fund for building secondary schools was founded and 70. 000 crown was collected, but the school construction was postponed due to the World War I. In 1917 another 300.000 crown was collected and the school started working, primarily in the house of the family Kraus, and later in the house of the family Bruner so that could finally be moved in a new building designed by architect Jozef Shver.

=== World War I ===
During World War I a military lazaretto was opened in Odžaci in the elementary school where the wounded people from the front were treated. In World War I 162 people of Odžaci were killed. After the liberation Odžaci became part of the Kingdom of SCS and later part of the Kingdom of Yugoslavia.

=== World War II and Kulturbund ===
In 1920 Kulturbund, a German nationalist organization was founded. The organization was banned two times, first in 1924, and second during the January dictatorship. The first branch of Kulturbund was formed in Bačka in 1920 in Parabuć (Ratkovo). In 1930 the work of Kulurband was allowed. The action in Kulturbund was radicalized and national-socialistic ideas were accepted in the organization when Adolf Hitler started to govern in Germany. From year to year the number of members increased, especially after 1939 and the beginning of World War II. During the war the organization got stronger and became main organizer of the social life in German areas in Bačka, including Odžaci as well. It also organized the departure of young Germans to Wehrmacht and SS units. After the invasion of forces of the Third Reich on Yugoslavia, the territory of Bačka was occupied by the Hungarian army. During the occupation the Nazi Hungarian army and gendarmerie did a systematic persecution : Serbs, Jews, Gypsies and political opponents of all nationalities.

=== The period after the World War II ===
The liberation finally came on October 22, 1944. Odžaci was liberated by the brigades of Vojvodina together with a unit of the Red army. More serious battles with the Hungarian gendarmes were led by the Bačkopalanački unit on October 17 between Parabuć (Ratkovo) and Odžaci. On the day of liberation, there was no resistance or reception for the liberators since the area had been inhabited by Germans, who mostly had left the country with the withdrawing German army. The first convoy departed on October 9. A number of Germans stayed; they were interned in camps, and afterwards they left the country and moved mainly into Austria and Germany.

After the liberation of these areas, the Battle of Batina started which was the biggest battle in this region where soldiers of the Red army and the brigades of Vojvodina commanded by the lieutenant Sreta Savić, managed to defeat German forces numbering 60,000 soldiers, crossed Danube and liberated Darda and Beli Manastir, which resulted with suppressing the German forces on the territory of Hungary. After the end of World War II the population in the less developed areas in Vojvodina was colonized so that the areas where German national minority lived could be populated. In municipality of Odžaci colonists from south Serbia settled and they were mainly from: Vranje, Leskovac, Pirot, Niš and Toplice district. In Karavukovo colonists from Vranjska kotlina and Gornja Pčinja settled, in Ratkovo from Toplice and vicinity of Leskovac, in Srpski Miletić from Jablanica, Vlasotinac and Suva Reka, in Deronje from vicinity of Pirot, and in Odžaci from vicinity of Pirot and Niš. In Bački Brestovac and Bački Gračac colonists from Bosnia and Lika settled.

With the liberation the number of population was constantly increasing. Soon a new school was opened, State high school, later known as High school "Jovan Jovanović Zmaj". After the war the industry in Odžaci was developing very fast. Odžaci became local and municipal center of west Bačka. The following industries were developed: food, textile, metal, chemical, construction and graphic industry. "Cordage" factory was nationalized and got a new name: "Lola Ribar". The work of the factory was expanded and modernized so in 1960 production of woven carpets, pvc flooring etc. was started.

In 1971 the processing of polypropylene for production of embroidery and foil was started, and in 1979 the factory expanded with the opening of a new section for production of yarn based on: polypropylene, polyester, polyacrylic and fibers. On October 10, 1955 the first textile Secondary Technical School of fiber was opened in Odžaci, at the instance of the jointed textile professions of Yugoslavia, which contributed for the further development of textile industry in the municipality. The cultural life of the municipality became richer and diverse.

== Settlements ==
Aside from the town of Odžaci, the municipality includes the following settlements:

- Bački Brestovac
- Bački Gračac
- Bogojevo
- Deronje
- Karavukovo
- Lalić
- Ratkovo
- Srpski Miletić

== Demographics ==
Historical population
Year	Pop.	±% p.a.
1948	39,355	—
1953	41,124	+0.88%
1961	42,242	+0.34%
1971	39,585	−0.65%
1981	37,967	−0.42%
1991	37,501	−0.12%
2002	35,582	−0.48%
2011	30,154	−1.82%
2022	24,926	−1.72%

According to the census done in 2011, the municipality of Odžaci has 30,154 inhabitants.

=== Ethnic groups ===
National structure (2011)
1. Serbs (83.2%)
2. Hungarians (3.94%)
3. Romani (3.43%)
4. Slovaks (2.77%)
5. Others (6.70%)

Ethnically, the municipality is mixed, with 25,077 Serbs (83.16%) being the majority, followed by 1,188 Hungarians (3.94%), 1,035 Romani (3.43%), 835 Slovaks (2.77%) and others. Settlements with Serb ethnic majority are: Odžaci, Bački Brestovac, Bački Gračac, Deronje, Karavukovo, Ratkovo, and Srpski Miletić. The settlement with Hungarian ethnic majority is Bogojevo. Ethnically mixed settlement with relative Slovak majority is Lalić.

The ethnic composition of the municipality:

Ethnic group	Population	%
Serbs	25,077	83.16%
Hungarians	1,188	3.94%
Romani	1,035	3.43%
Slovaks	835	2.77%
Croats	225	0.75%
Montenegrins	121	0.40%
Yugoslavs	105	0.35%
Romanians	100	0.33%
Rusyns	61	0.20%
Germans	60	0.20%
Macedonians	46	0.15%
Ukrainians	27	0.09%
Slovenians	17	0.06%
Bunjevci	13	0.04%
Russians	11	0.04%
Muslims	11	0.04%
Others	1,221	4.05%
Total	30,154	

== Economy ==
The textile industry, chemical industry and agricultural machine industry are developed in Odžaci.

The following table gives a preview of total number of registered people employed in legal entities per their core activity (as of 2018):

Activity	Total
Agriculture, forestry and fishing	598
Mining and quarrying	-
Manufacturing	2,983
Electricity, gas, steam and air conditioning supply	21
Water supply; sewerage, waste management and remediation activities	88
Construction	150
Wholesale and retail trade, repair of motor vehicles and motorcycles	763
Transportation and storage	243
Accommodation and food services	156
Information and communication	29
Financial and insurance activities	45
Real estate activities	-
Professional, scientific and technical activities	150
Administrative and support service activities	94
Public administration and defense; compulsory social security	397
Education	404
Human health and social work activities	322
Arts, entertainment and recreation	68
Other service activities	117
Individual agricultural workers	324
Total	6,954

== Culture ==
The annual International Multimedial Art Festival (IMAF) is held in Odžaci since 1998.

== Sport ==
The first football team in Odžaci was founded in 1919 by the name "Odžaci sport club", and in 1928 a tennis club was founded which was one of the favorites in the tennis competitions then in the country. The tennis club had 5 tennis courts. Between the two wars the Falcon society part of Falcons Kingdom of Yugoslavia worked in Odžaci and a Falcon rally was held. Odžaci has two football clubs: Tekstilac and OFK Odžaci. Tekstilac was founded in 1919, and Tekstilac's stadium is named "Ivo Lola Ribar" after a Yugoslav hero. OFK Odžaci was formed in 1969 and named Trgovački then lately changed its name to OFK Odžaci. Odžaci also has a tennis club, basketball club KK Odžaci and karate club Mladost

== Notable people ==
- Kaća Čelan, writer, director and actress
- Ladislav Nemet Roman-Catholic Archbishop of Belgrade, President of the International Episcopal Conference of Saints Cyril and Methodius

== Twin towns ==
- Mátranovák, Hungary
