= Ratkovo =

Ratkovo Ратково (Serbian)
- Village (Selo)
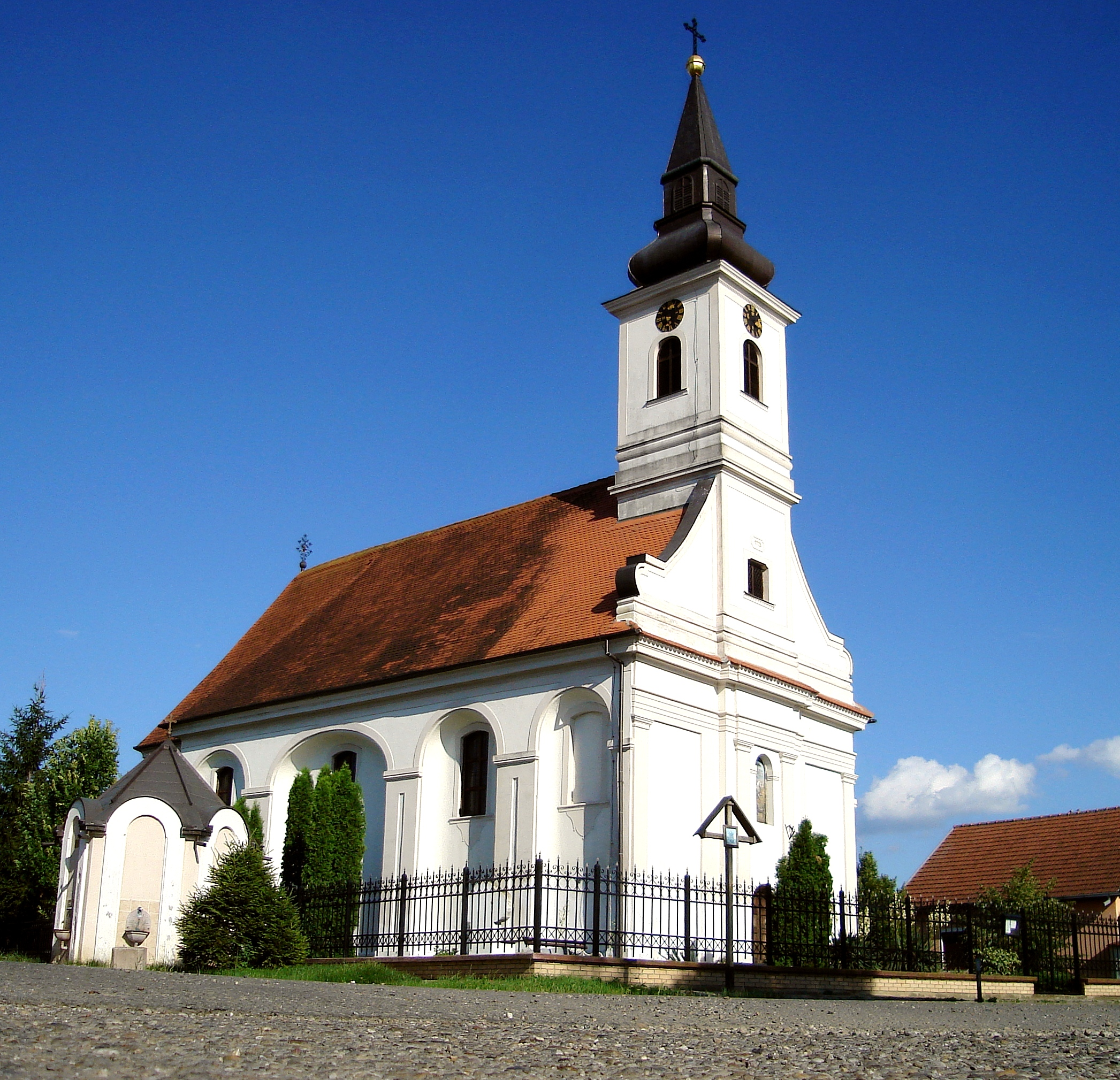
- The Orthodox Church

- Location within Vojvodina Location within Serbia Location within Europe
- Coordinates: 45°27′N 19°20′E
- Country: Serbia
- Province: Vojvodina
- Region: Bačka
- District: West Bačka
- Municipality: Odžaci
- Elevation: 299 ft (91 m)

Population (2011)
  - Total: 3,411
- Time zone: UTC+1 (CET)
  - Summer (DST): UTC+2 (CEST)

Ratkovo (Serbian Cyrillic: Ратково) is a village located in the Odžaci municipality, West Bačka District, Vojvodina, Serbia. As of 2011, the population of the village is 3,411 inhabitants.

== Name ==
The former name of the town was Parabuć (Serbian: Парабућ). In German, it was known as Parabutsch, and in Hungarian as Paripás or Parabuty. In 1948, it was renamed Ratkovo for Ratko "Chico" Pavlović, a Yugoslav fighter in the Spanish Civil War.

== History ==
The village was first mentioned in 1543. During the Ottoman rule (16th-17th century), Parabuć was populated by Serbs. Since the end of the 17th century, the village belonged to the Habsburg monarchy, and since 1781 many Germans settled here besides Serbs. Between 1918 and 1991, it was part of Yugoslavia.

== Demographics ==
Historical population
Year	Pop.	±% p.a.
1948	4,835	—
1953	4,904	+0.28%
1961	5,266	+0.89%
1971	4,684	−1.16%
1981	4,337	−0.77%
1991	4,114	−0.53%
2002	4,118	+0.01%
2011	3,411	−2.07%

According to the last official census done in 2011, the village of Ratkovo has 3,411 inhabitants.

== Gallery ==
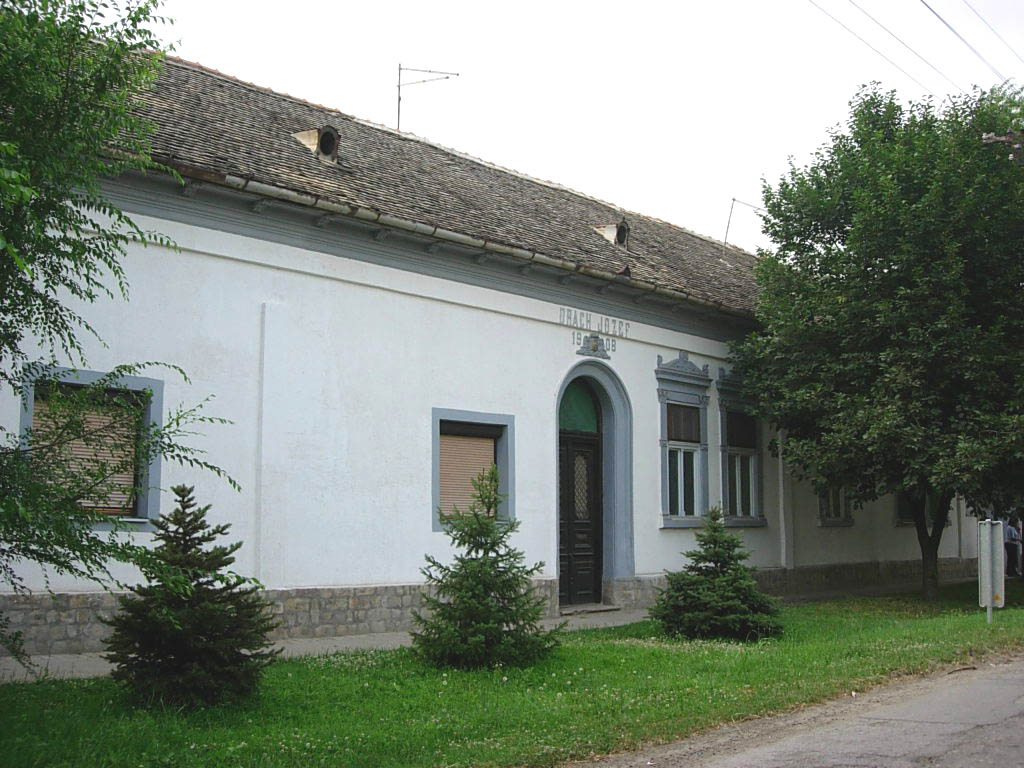
Old house

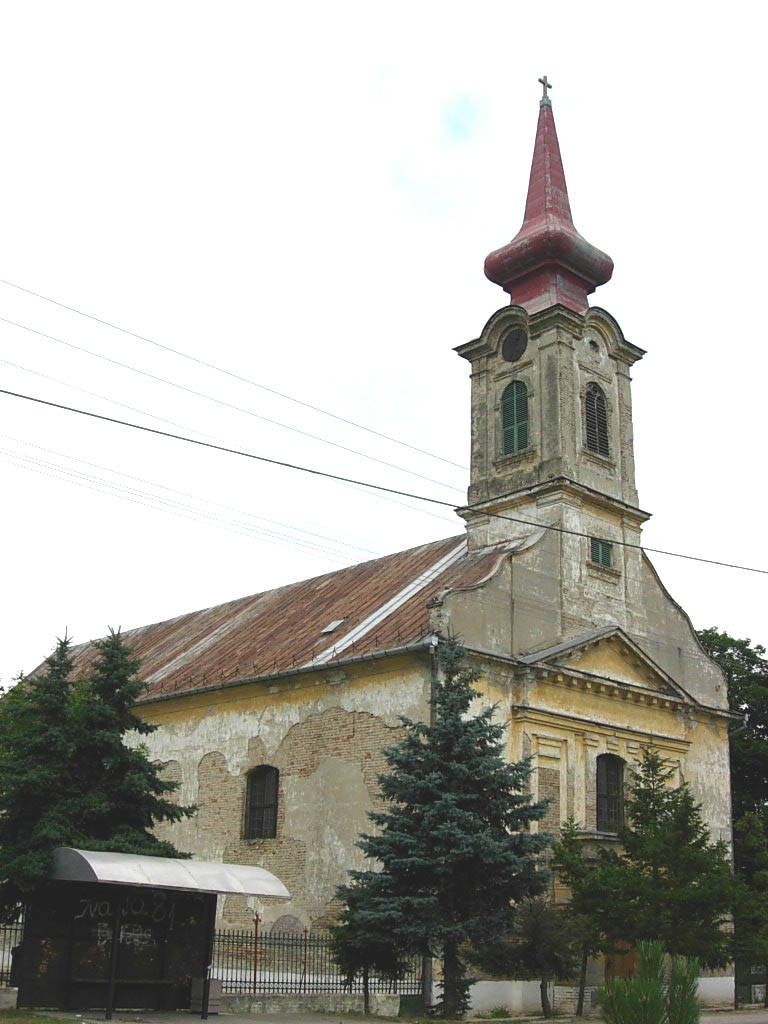
The Saint John Nepomuk Catholic Church

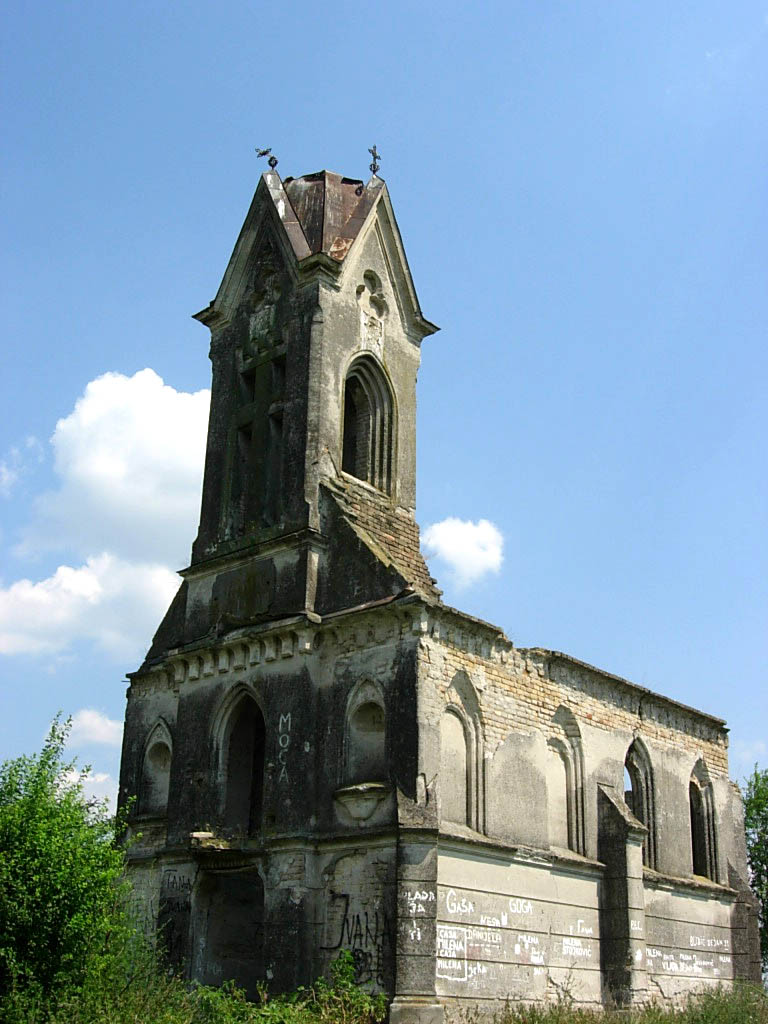
The Saint Joseph Chapel in catholic graveyard

== Notable people ==
- Jovica Stanišić (b. 1950), intelligence officer, former Head of the State Security Service
- Kaća Čelan (b. 1956), writer, director and actress
- Boško Perošević (1956–2000), politician, former Chairmen of the Executive Council of Vojvodina

== See also ==
- List of places in Serbia
- List of cities, towns and villages in Vojvodina
