= State Road 10 (Serbia) =

Road in Serbia

State Road 10
- Serbian: Državni put IB reda 10; Serbian Cyrillic: Државни пут IБ реда 10

Route information
- Part of E70
- Maintained by JP "Putevi Srbije"
- Length: 91.463 km (56.832 mi)

Major junctions
- From: Pančevo
- 14 in Pančevo; 130 in Pančevo; 132 near Alibunar; 310 in Banatski Karlovac; 133 in Uljma; 18 in Vršac
- To: Serbia – Romania border at Vatin E70

Location
- Country: Serbia
- Districts: City of Belgrade, South Banat

Highway system
- Roads in Serbia; Motorways
← 47	→ 11

State Road 10, or referred to as Belgrade – Vatin road (Serbian: Пут Београд – Ватин / Put Beograd – Vatin), is a state road in northern Serbia, connecting Belgrade with Romania at Vatin border crossing. It runs through the southern Banat region.

The road is a part of European route E70.

== Sections ==
Section number	Length	Distance	Section name
01001/01002	5.216 km (3.241 mi)	5.216 km (3.241 mi)	Belgrade (printing company) – Pančevo interchange
01003/01004	2.862 km (1.778 mi)	8.078 km (5.019 mi)	Pančevo interchange – Vojvodina administrative line (Pančevo)
01005/01006	5.038 km (3.130 mi)	13.116 km (8.150 mi)	Vojvodina administrative line (Pančevo) – Pančevo (Kovin)
01007/01008	1.257 km (0.781 mi)	14.373 km (8.931 mi)	Pančevo (Kovin) – Pančevo (Kovačica)
01009	31.823 km (19.774 mi)/0.106 km (0.066 mi)	46.196 km (28.705 mi)	Pančevo (Kovačica) – Alibunar (Plandište)
01010	5.196 km (3.229 mi)	51.392 km (31.934 mi)	Alibunar (Plandište) – Banatski Karlovac (Alibunar)
01011	0.308 km (0.191 mi)	51.700 km (32.125 mi)	Banatski Karlovac (Alibunar) – Banatski Karlovac (Devojački Bunar)
01012	11.953 km (7.427 mi)	63.293 km (39.328 mi)	Banatski Karlovac (Devojački Bunar) – Uljma
01013	14.920 km (9.271 mi)/0.584 km (0.363 mi)	78.213 km (48.599 mi)	Uljma – Vršac (Plandište)
01014	0.741 km (0.460 mi)	78.954 km (49.060 mi)	Vršac (Plandište) – Vršac (Straža)
01015	12.509 km (7.773 mi)	91.463 km (56.832 mi)	Vršac (Straža) – Serbia-Romania border (Vatin)

== Planned motorway ==
According to the Space Plan of Republic of Serbia, the motorway construction is being planned, which will be categorized as A9 and run side-by-side with the existing route. The given section would start at Belgrade bypass (which would include Pančevo from the "Pančevo-north" interchange), and end at the border with Romania. The planned highway would go south of existing route until Alibunar, and then north until Vatin, where it would be connected to Romania's also-planned A9 motorway and the rest of the Romanian road network.

== See also ==
- European route E70
- Roads in Serbia
- National Road (M)1.9
