= State Road 18 (Serbia) =

Road in Serbia

State Road 18
- Serbian: Državni put IB reda 18; Serbian Cyrillic: Државни пут IБ реда 18

Route information
- Part of E70 Vršac (Plandište) – Vršac (Straža)
- Maintained by JP "Putevi Srbije"
- Length: 134.422 km (83.526 mi)

Major junctions
- From: Zrenjanin
- 308 in Sutjeska; 129 in Sečanj; 132 in Plandište; 10 in Vršac; 133 in Straža; 134 in Bela Crkva
- To: Serbia – Romania border at Kaluđerovo

Location
- Country: Serbia
- Districts: Central Banat, South Banat

Highway system
- Roads in Serbia; Motorways
← 17	→ 19

State Road 18, is an IB-class road in northern Serbia, connecting Zrenjanin with Romania at Kaluđerovo. It is located in Vojvodina.

Before the new road categorization regulation given in 2013, the route wore the following names: M 7.1, M 1.9 and P 126 (before 2012) / 20, A3, 114 and 112 (after 2012).

The existing route is a main road with two traffic lanes. By the valid Space Plan of Republic of Serbia the road is not planned for upgrading to motorway, and is expected to be conditioned in its current state.

Section from Vršac (Plandište) to Vršac (Straža) is a part of European route E70.

== Sections ==
Section number	Length	Distance	Section name
01801	22.248 km (13.824 mi)	22.248 km (13.824 mi)	Zrenjanin (Sečanj) – Sutjeska (Sečanj)
01802	6.297 km (3.913 mi)	28.545 km (17.737 mi)	Sutjeska (Sečanj) – Sečanj (Jaša Tomić)
01803	1.374 km (0.854 mi)	29.919 km (18.591 mi)	Sečanj (Jaša Tomić) – Sečanj (Neuzina) (overlap with)
01804	37.727 km (23.442 mi)	67.646 km (42.033 mi)	Sečanj (Neuzina) – Plandište
01014	19.043 km (11.833 mi)	86.689 km (53.866 mi)	Plandište – Vršac (Plandište)
01805	0.741 km (0.460 mi)	87.430 km (54.326 mi)	Vršac (Plandište) – Vršac (Straža) (overlap with)
01806	18.422 km (11.447 mi)/2.122 km (1.319 mi)	105.852 km (65.773 mi)	Vršac (Straža) – Straža
01807	17.118 km (10.637 mi)	122.970 km (76.410 mi)	Straža – Bela Crkva
01808	11.452 km (7.116 mi)	134.422 km (83.526 mi)	Bela Crkva – Serbia – Romania border (Kaluđerovo)

== See also ==
- Roads in Serbia
- European route E70
