= Vatin circles =

Prehistoric circles in Serbia

Vatin Circles
- Vatinski Krugovi
- Location within Serbia
- Location: Vatin, Vršac, Serbia
- Coordinates: 45°13′55.92″N 21°14′37.32″Eyes

Vatin circles are an archaeological site near the village of Vatin near Vršac. It consists of four regular concentric circles that, going from larger to smaller, form a slight elevation.

== Size and purpose ==
Vatin circles have a diameter of around 150 meters while the Vlajkovac circles around 300 meters. It is not known for sure how they were created or what their purpose was. It is assumed that they served as observatories for monitoring the movements of the sun and planets. On the winter solstice, December 21, was recorded from Vatin that the sun rises at the very foot of the mountains, on the extreme left, and that it symbolically climbs along the edge of the hill all the way to Gudurički vrh, the highest in Vojvodina. Seen from the Vlajkovac circles, which are located on the other side of the mountain, at an angle of 90 degrees, the sun also rises at the foot of the highest peak, which, viewed from that perspective, is the hill on which the Vršac Castle is located. This indicates that Vatin could serve as a winter sanctuary, and Vlajkovac as a summer sanctuary. Vatin circles are fully preserved and have survived for so many millennia only because they are located on barren marshland, which was not cultivated by farmers. This, however, is not the case with the twice larger Vlajkovac circles, which have been plowed over several times and now only their outlines are visible. Both formations are also visible from satellites.

== Findings and dating ==
Objects that were found near the circles also speak in support of the assumption that these are Neolithic creations. They were estimated in the Vršac City Museum to belong to the Vinča culture and are estimated to be 6500 years old. Also, on the eastern side of the circles near Vatin, there are the foundations of a smaller object, from which, most likely, the planets were observed. There are also Roman moats nearby, as well as numerous mounds from various periods, which indicates that the place has always been suitable for life.
