= Vlajkovac Monastery =

Serbian Orthodox monastery in Vlajkovac, Serbia

- Манастир Влајковац
- Vlajkovac Monastery

- Location within Serbia

Monastery information
- Order: Serbian Orthodox
- Denomination: Serbian Orthodox Church
- Established: 2008
- Dedication: Saint Demetrius
- Diocese: Eparchy of Banat

Architecture
- Status: Monastery
- Functional status: Active
- Completed date: 1872

Site
- Location: Vlajkovac
- Country: Serbia
- Coordinates: 45.0715°N 21.200166°E
- Public access: yes

The Vlajkovac Monastery (Serbian: Манастир Влајковац, romanized: Manastir Vlajkovac) is a Serbian Orthodox monastery belonging to the Eparchy of Banat, located in the village of Vlajkovac near Vršac, Serbia.

== History ==
The church was built in 1872 and consecrated by district protopresbyter Filip Trandafilović with the blessing of the Bishop of Vršac. It is dedicated to Saint Demetrius.

In 1965, the church was renovated by local residents. The iconostasis is built of masonry, while the icons are painted on canvas and are the work of an unknown 19th-century icon painter. With the blessing of Nikanor, Bishop of Banat, the parish church became a monastery church in 2008. The local Serbian parish was founded in 1872, as testified by parish registers kept in the Romanian language.

== See also ==
- List of Serbian Orthodox monasteries
