= Craftsman =

Craftsman may refer to:

== A profession ==
- Artisan, a skilled manual worker who makes items that may be functional or strictly decorative
- Master craftsman, an artisan who has achieved such a standard that he may establish his own workshop and take on apprentices
- Tradesman, a worker specialising in an occupation that requires work experience, on-the-job training or vocational education, but not a degree and is not necessarily restricted to manual work
- Craftsman, a military rank within the Royal Electrical and Mechanical Engineers, equivalent to a private

== Arts, media, and entertainment ==
- American Craftsman, an American domestic architectural and interior design style inspired by the Arts and Crafts movement
- Craftsman (album), a 1995 album by Guy Clark
- The Craftsman (book), a 2008 book by Richard Sennett
- The Craftsman (TV series), a 2021–23 reality lifestyle series
- The Craftsman (newspaper), an 18th-century British newspaper
- The Craftsman (magazine), a 20th-century American magazine of furniture and architectural style begun by Gustav Stickley
- Craftsman Magazine, a magazine published in the UK from 1983 to 2007

== Brands and companies ==
- Craftsman (tools), a brand of tools, lawn and garden equipment, and work wear formerly controlled by Sears Holdings, now owned by Black and Decker, Inc.
- Craftsman Book Company, publisher of technical references for construction professionals
- Craftsman furniture, the Arts and Crafts Movement style furniture of Gustav Stickley's Craftsman Workshops

== Other ==
- The Craftsmen (from Scottish Gaelic Ceàrdannan of the same meaning), a name for the indigenous Highland Traveller population
- American Craftsman, an architecture style

== See also ==
- Craft, the profession of a craftsman
- Craft production, the manufacturing process
- Craftsman Truck Series, the sponsor name of the NASCAR Camping World Truck Series from 1996 through 2008
- Demiurge, or rational craftsman, a philosophical concept for an artisan-like figure responsible for the fashioning and maintenance of the physical universe
- Handicraft, the product of a craftsman
- Craftsmanship, the degree of quality exhibited by a handicraft (or a measure of how well-made or intricate the handicraft is)
