= American Cement Association =

American industry organization

- Abbreviation: ACA
- Formation: October 23, 1902; 124 years ago
- Founded at: New York City
- Headquarters: 200 Massachusetts Avenue NW, Suite 200
- Location: Washington, D.C.
- Region served: United States
- Board Chair: Monica Manolas
- Vice Board Chair: David Loomes
- CEO: Diane Tomb
- Website: www.cement.org
- Formerly called: Association of Portland Cement Manufacturers, Portland Cement Association

The American Cement Association (ACA), formerly known as the Portland Cement Association, is a nonprofit, trade association that is the premier policy, education, and market intelligence organization serving America’s cement manufacturers. ACA prioritizes safety, innovation and sustainability while fostering continuous improvement in cement manufacturing, distribution, infrastructure, and economic growth. Additionally, the organization conducts and sponsors research, and participates in setting cement manufacturing standards, among other functions.

== History ==
Publication of the Portland Cement Association

ACA's history dates back to 1902, following a meeting of cement manufacturers in the eastern U.S. who assembled to discuss problems with cement packaging. At the time, cement was packaged in reusable cloth sacks that were returned to the manufacturer, but that created problems for consumers. On October 1, 1902, this issue prompted the formation of a temporary organization that would represent all the manufacturers involved. The organization was unofficially called "the Eastern Portland Cement Manufacturers." The organization was formally established and its constitution and by-laws adopted by the representatives of 20 cement companies in New York on October 23, 1902, and renamed the Association of Portland Cement Manufacturers.

In 1916, as the Association entered into a contract with the Lewis Institute to conduct joint research in concrete, it was renamed again to the Portland Cement Association, and its headquarters moved from Philadelphia to Chicago. In 2021, the headquarters was relocated from Chicago to Washington, D.C.

On May 7, 2025, at the cement industry’s largest annual conference (the IEEE-IAS/ACA Cement Conference) the organization announced it was being renamed to the American Cement Association (ACA). The association’s Board of Directors unanimously agreed the rebranding was a more accurate description of its membership, as some U.S. cement companies had diversified the materials they produce, no longer solely producing portland (traditional) cement. In addition to traditional cement, many domestic producers manufacture lower-carbon or blended cements, which reduce cement’s carbon footprint by up to 10%.

Roadmap to Carbon Neutrality

In October 2021, ACA published its Roadmap to Carbon Neutrality, which is an overall strategy for cement manufacturers to decarbonize the industry by 2050, chiefly by the use of alternative fuels, lower-carbon cements, and the eventual development of carbon capture, utilization and storage. The Roadmap also provides guidance for members of the cement/concrete/construction value chain, and state and federal policymakers, as to how they can work with cement manufacturers to reach carbon neutrality.

== ACA Departments ==
Advocacy

ACA’s Government Affairs team in Washington, D.C. regularly engages with presidential administrations and federal policymakers to communicate up-to-date information about the industry’s challenges and its stances on certain legislation and regulations that impact U.S. cement companies.

Market Intelligence

ACA’s Market intelligence team produces reports that reflect the latest economic and construction sector data and analysis. Its state and national economic forecasts contain dozens of series and are widely used in corporate planning, government policy development and by the news media.

Beyond its forecasts, ACA’s Market Intelligence reports on cement consumption, production, and imports. It also acts as a repository for information about the cement industry spanning over five decades, including cement plant characteristics, energy efficiency, labor productivity, and changes to domestic capacity.

Research, Technology and Outreach

ACA's Research, Technology, and Outreach team leads the association in advancing the use and applications of cement and concrete throughout the construction value chain in all areas of the built environment. The group is responsible for ACA’s efforts in research, education, standards, specifications, and technology transfer. Those efforts include engagement with stakeholders, national and international standards developing organizations, publications, presentations, and workshops and seminars.

Library Services

Founded in 1938, the ACA Library holds one of the world’s largest collections of literature about cement and concrete. It continually updates and expands its collections with important materials relevant to the industry.

The library also provides access to specialized literature and online book resources as well as librarian-assisted literature searches and article delivery.

== See also ==
- American Concrete Institute

== Literature cited ==
- Dold, R. Bruce, ed. (November 20, 2014), "From the community: Toscas Named President/CEO of Portland Cement Association", Chicago Tribune, Chicago: Tribune Publishing, ISSN 2165-171X, LCCN sn83045111, OCLC 60639020
- Baden, Anne L.; Martino, Robert A. (November 28, 1941), Standardization activities of national technical and trade organizations, National Bureau of Standards miscellaneous publication (169 ed.), Washington: United States Government Publishing Office, LCCN 42037792, OCLC 368669
- Fairchild, Iler James (April 26, 1927), Organizations cooperating with the national Bureau of standards, Miscellaneous publications, vol. 96, Washington: United States Government Publishing Office, LCCN 27026556, OCLC 28009302
- Lesley, Robert W.; Lober, John B.; Bartlett, George S. (1924), History of the Portland cement industry in the United States, with appendices covering progress of the industry by years and an outline of the organization and activities of the Portland cement association (PDF), Chicago: International trade Press Inc., LCCN 25009329, OCLC 7429788
- Schwartz, Max (2000), Basic concrete engineering for builders, vol. 1, Carlsbad: Craftsman Book Co., ISBN 1572180919, LCCN 2003267693, OCLC 45195699
- Wilson Yu, Anne (October 28, 2016), "Taking the life-cycle perspective: Report addresses critical issues in building practices", mit.edu, Cambridge: Massachusetts Institute of Technology
- "Leadership", cement.org
