= Aktion Intelligenzija in Karlsdorf =

The Aktion Intelligenzija in Karlsdorf refers to the abduction, mistreatment and execution of 36 predominantly Danube Swabian inhabitants of Karlsdorf. These war crimes mainly took place between 4 and 11 November 1944 and were carried out by Yugoslav partisans, presumably as part of a nationwide intelligence operation initiated by the Titoist regime immediately after the liberation of Yugoslavia from German occupation during World War II. The term Aktion Intelligenzija derives from the contemporary or commemorative terminology used in Danube Swabian documentary literature. The historical interpretation of these events, particularly questions concerning planning, structures of responsibility and the relationship to nationwide measures against the German minority, remains disputed within historiography.

Starting point of the Aktion Intelligenzija: the municipal building in Karlsdorf around 1900

Karlsdorf town centre before the murder and expulsion of the German-speaking population

== Background and research debate ==
After hostilities against the Wehrmacht in the southwestern Banat had ended, the German-descended inhabitants living there were categorized by the partisan movement under Josip Broz Tito as enemies of the people or traitors to the country. Accordingly, Danube Swabian documentary literature predominantly presents the view that the educated class of this population group was apparently intended to be liquidated in order to bring the German-speaking minority under control, with the Soviet model serving as a possible precedent. A widely discussed but not conclusively substantiated thesis in historical research holds that the OZNA, the Yugoslav security and intelligence service, planned an operation under the codename Intelligenzija to implement this objective.

After a military administration had been established in Vojvodina, bringing approximately 160,000 Danube Swabians under Tito's rule, the first systematic arrests of prominent representatives of the ethnic German population group began in the second half of October 1944. In cooperation between the secret police, a military special unit of the People's Defence Corps of Yugoslavia and the local military administration, detainees were interrogated, frequently mistreated and tortured, and subsequently herded together in improvised camps. Whether Tito himself gave the order for these measures is not known. At least the “organizational structure of the military administration” for the “Banat, the Bačka and the Baranja, with its department for mobilization, camps and labor service” indicates “that at least a rather general, possibly only verbal order from the very top” was aimed at a “special treatment” of the German and Hungarian populations. In this context, Michael Portmann shares the view that emerged from the “Dokumentation der Vertreibung” as well as from “Danube Swabian literature,” namely that “a planned, centrally controlled course of action” should be assumed. Given the hierarchical structure of the party and the army under Tito, he must at least have known about the executions and approved of them.

The Serbian historian Zoran Janjetović, on the other hand, regards the killings of Karlsdorf inhabitants merely as a “reprisal measure for the mistreatment and summary expulsion of Serbian colonists in April 1941”. According to this interpretation, Hans Sonnleitner, a survivor of the massacre, transformed spontaneous outbreaks of violence immediately following the liberation of Yugoslavia from Nazi occupation into the Aktion Intelligenzija. Janjetović rejects the thesis of an intelligence operation planned from above and carried out systematically, arguing that comparable executions did not take place in all German or Hungarian settlements and that “in some cases even beardless boys were killed” who “certainly did not belong to the village intelligentsia”.

== Course of events ==
Karl-Franz Leidecker, born on 4 October 1878 in Detta (Timiș County), victim of the mass execution near White Church and, as a municipal notary, the most important administrative official of Karlsdorf during the German occupation of Yugoslavia

In October 1944, a partisan unit demanded that a number of ethnic Germans be handed over at the Karlsdorf municipal office so that they could be executed. The demand was initially rejected by local Serbs on the grounds that there were no guilty persons. Nevertheless, individual Karlsdorf residents were murdered from the end of October onward. When another partisan unit appeared at the municipal office on 4 November 1944, prominent Germans were arrested and mistreated there. The wife of one of those arrested was told by the Serbian Titoist partisans that the reason was that those arrested were the “intelligentsia”. The 13-year-old Hans Sonnleitner, whose father was among those arrested, was interrogated. Preparations were made to execute the boy, but he was eventually allowed to leave. A total of six women and 27 men were eventually loaded onto several horse-drawn wagons in front of the Karlsdorf municipal office and deported to White Church. When one of the women went into labour on the way, she was taken off the wagon and murdered in the militia building in Jasenovo. After numerous further instances of mistreatment, the remaining deportees were jointly shot on 8 or 11 November 1944 near White Church in the “Schindergrube” on the Nera-Mühlen Canal. They had previously been forced to dig their own graves. (Note: See also: Sonnleitner 1986, pp. 81–93 and 224f. Sonnleitner gives a precise location: “the execution site at the Schindanger on the Nera-Mühlen Canal near the municipal knacker's yard, also called Schinder-Wasen, below the Nera mills.”)

The precise location where the deportees were imprisoned and tortured in White Church before their execution can be reconstructed in detail:

In Maderspach Street, in the southern part of the town, there is a prison […]. This prison is popularly called the “Stockhaus”. In Stefani Street, a parallel street to Maderpach Street, stood the house of the Jokl family. According to reports, they were taken at night to the cellar of this “Jokl house”, Nos. 42–44, as it was popularly known, to be tortured so that their screams could not be heard outside. After consultation with people familiar with conditions in White Church at the time, it is assumed that the route to the execution site at the Schindanger on the Nera-Mühlen Canal led either through Franz-Bauer-Allee or through Goethe or Schiller Street, across the military airfield. […]

— Hans Sonnleitner

== Social composition of the victims ==
Occupational and functional groups of victims by place of killing
Occupational or functional group	Number	Place of killing	Victims
Crafts and trades	12	White Church (10); Karlsdorf agricultural fields (1); Uljma (1)	Stefan Buchner; Arthur Görlich; Georg Harfmann; Gertrud Pursch; Josef Pursch; Michael Reichardt; Georg Schwarz; Hans Sonnleitner; Josef Spring; Nikolaus Ziegler; Balthasar Noheimer; Josef Armbruster
Commerce and self-employed businesses	8	White Church	Martin Fessner; Hans Kehr; Johann Kehr; Franz Michera; Barbara Murgul; Nikolaus Polt; Franz Schneider; Josef Volk
Agriculture	4	White Church	Nikolaus Iwanitza (born 1873); Nikolaus Iwanitza (born 1901); Johann Rohr; Josef Sandhas
Liberal and academic professions	4	White Church (3); Werschetz (1)	Josef Lenhardt; Jozo Rogitsch; Ludwig Zeller; Franz Basler
Employees	3	White Church	Barbara Theresia Ajvas; Olga Ajvas; Stefanie Schumacher
Milling and agricultural businesses	2	White Church	Philipp Iwanitza; Julius Krischer
Administration	1	White Church	Karl-Franz Leidecker
Clergy	1	White Church	Peter Weber
Housewife	1	Jasenovo	Maria Pursch
Total	36		

Among the victims were the so-called Gemeindenotär, the most important administrative official during the German occupation; two former mayors of Karlsdorf; a physician; a Roman Catholic priest; lawyers, one of whom (Jozo Rogitsch) had previously served as Minister for Sport and Physical Culture in the Stojadinović government; the head of the Karlsdorf Deutsche Frauenschaft; merchants and wholesalers; business and factory owners; self-employed farmers; master craftsmen; as well as ordinary employees and craftsmen.

== Legal proceedings ==
On 11 November 1983, a criminal complaint concerning torture and murder in Karlsdorf was filed with the public prosecutor's office and the Regional Court Munich I. The investigation was subsequently discontinued.

== Sources ==
- Arbeitskreis Dokumentation, ed. (1998), Verbrechen an den Deutschen in Jugoslawien 1944–1948. Die Stationen eines Völkermords, München: Donauschwäbische Kulturstiftung
- Sonnleitner, Hans (1986). Aktion Intelligenzija in Karlsdorf. Tatsachen und Hintergründe, Reflexionen zur Sinnfrage über Mord und Tod. Gedenkschrift 1944–1984 über die Ermordung von 36 Karlsdorfern (in German). Donauschwäbisches Archiv.
- Janjetović, Zoran (2 February 2013). "Nemci i Mađari u Jugoslaviji na kraju Drugog svetskog rata". Most Bruecke.
- Geiger, Vladimir (1993). "Položaj njemačke manjine u bivšoj Jugoslaviji (s posebnim osvrtom na razdoblje nakon drugog svjetskog rata)" (PDF). Historijski zbornik (in Croatian). 46 (1): 177.
