= State Road 17 (Serbia) =

Road in Serbia

State Road 17
- Serbian: Državni put IB reda 17; Serbian Cyrillic: Државни пут IБ реда 17

Route information
- Maintained by JP "Putevi Srbije"
- Length: 10.984 km (6.825 mi)

Major junctions
- From: Croatia – Serbia border at Bogojevo
- 107 near Bogojevo
- To: Srpski Miletić

Location
- Country: Serbia
- Districts: West Bačka

Highway system
- Roads in Serbia; Motorways
← 16	→ 18

State Road 17, is an IB-class road in northern Serbia, connecting Croatia at Bogojevo with Srpski Miletić. It is located in Vojvodina.

Before the new road categorization regulation given in 2013, the route wore the following names: M 3 (before 2012) / 31 (after 2012).

The existing route is a main road with two traffic lanes. By the valid Space Plan of Republic of Serbia the road is not planned for upgrading to motorway, and is expected to be conditioned in its current state.

== Sections ==
Section number	Length	Distance	Section name
01701	0.576 km (0.358 mi)	0.576 km (0.358 mi)	Croatia – Serbia border (Bogojevo) – Bogojevo (Apatin)
01702	10.408 km (6.467 mi)	10.984 km (6.825 mi)	Bogojevo (Apatin) – Srpski Miletić

== See also ==
- Roads in Serbia
