= Uljma =

Uljma Уљма
- Village (Selo)
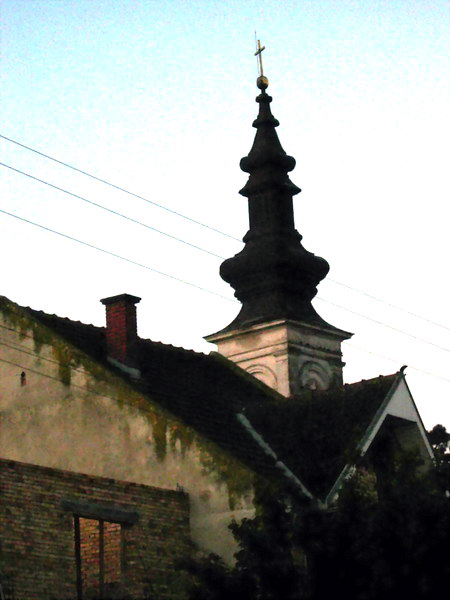
- The Orthodox Church

- Location of Uljma within Serbia Uljma (Serbia) Uljma (Europe)
- Coordinates: 45°02′17″N 21°09′13″E
- Country: Serbia
- Province: Vojvodina
- District: South Banat
- Municipality: Vršac
- Elevation: 89 m (292 ft)

Population (2022)
  - Uljma: 2,905
- Time zone: UTC+1 (CET)
  - Summer (DST): UTC+2 (CEST)
- Postal code: 26330
- Area code: +381(0)13
- Car plates: VŠ

Uljma (Serbian Cyrillic: Уљма; Hungarian: Homokszil) is a village in Serbia. It is situated in the Vršac municipality, in the South Banat District, Vojvodina province. The village has a Serb ethnic majority (83.01%) with a present Romanian minority (11.11%) and its population numbering 3,089 people (2011 census).

== History ==
Bronze Age graves of steppe nomads was found in the village.

== Geography ==
Uljma is situated between villages Vlajkovac, Izbište and Nikolinci.

== Historical population ==
- 1961: 4,237
- 1971: 4,391
- 1981: 4,115
- 1991: 3,961
- 2002: 3,598
- 2011: 3,089
- 2022: 2,905

== See also ==
- List of places in Serbia
- List of cities, towns and villages in Vojvodina
