= Mathias Schneider =

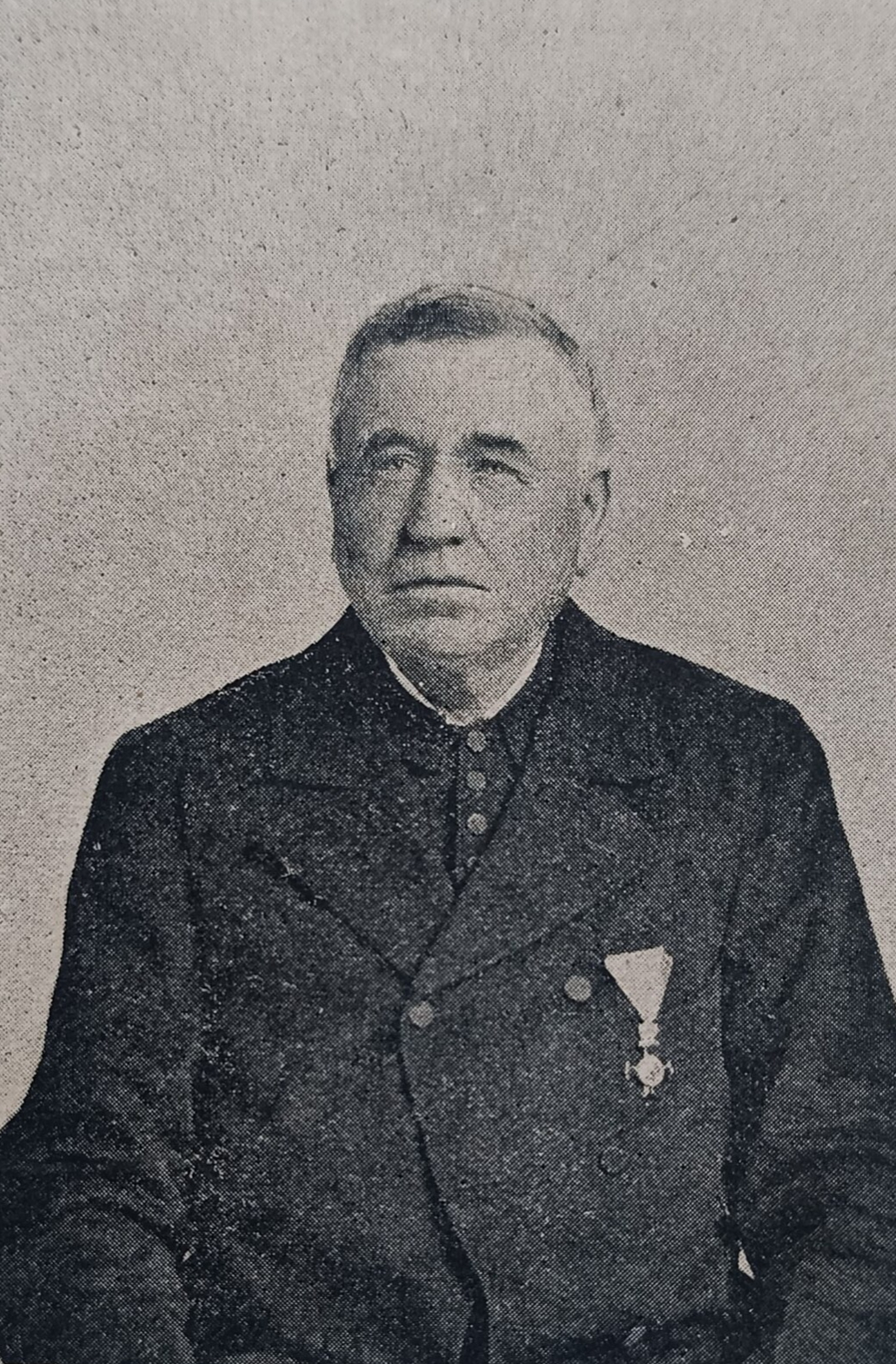
The Karlsdorf judge Mathias Schneider around 1902, wearing the highest class of the Austro-Hungarian Cross of Merit (Austria-Hungary) on the left side of his chest

Mathias Schneider (* 15 October 1834 in Karlsdorf; † 2 February 1917) (Note: The exact dates of birth and death are taken from information provided by his great-great-grandson Horst Eberle.) was a Hungarian-German judge. He acted as the spokesman of a Danube Swabian deputation during the dissolution of the Banat Military Frontier in 1872/73. Schneider was elected judge in Karlsdorf in 1871 (today Banatski Karlovac, a municipality in the Južni Banat District) and, after the end of military administration, was the first person there to hold a constitutional judicial office until 1875.

== Youth ==
Schneider was the son of Franz Schneider, a respected citizen of Karlsdorf who was regarded as a "man of the people." During the revolutionary period of 1848/49, his father came into conflict with Serbian troops because of his contacts with Hungarian units. According to a report by local historian Ludwig Szmida, the then 14-year-old Mathias prevented his father's arrest through deception. (Note: Ludwig Szmida anecdotally recorded Mathias Schneider's youthful cleverness, which is meant to illustrate the diplomatic skill he already possessed at a very young age, particularly in delicate conflict situations: Franz Schneider had entertained 30 Schwarzenberg Uhlans and was therefore reputed to be a friend of the Hungarians, who were involved in a series of military confrontations with the Serbs. On 2 July 1848, a larger Serbian force marched from Alibunar toward Karlsdorf to arrest Franz Schneider. Franz Schneider had been warned and was able to hide in the attic in time, while his 14-year-old son Mathias received the Serbian soldiers, whom he personally knew as pupils from Alibunar. He deceived the soldiers by claiming that his father had traveled to Werschetz and might return at any moment. Under this pretext, he tactically entertained the Serbs with bacon and a considerable quantity of wine. As the now very good-humored soldiers were unable to find his father, they merely instructed that he should no longer entertain Hungarians in the future. The soldiers were then able to return to Alibunar without losing face.)

== Political activity ==
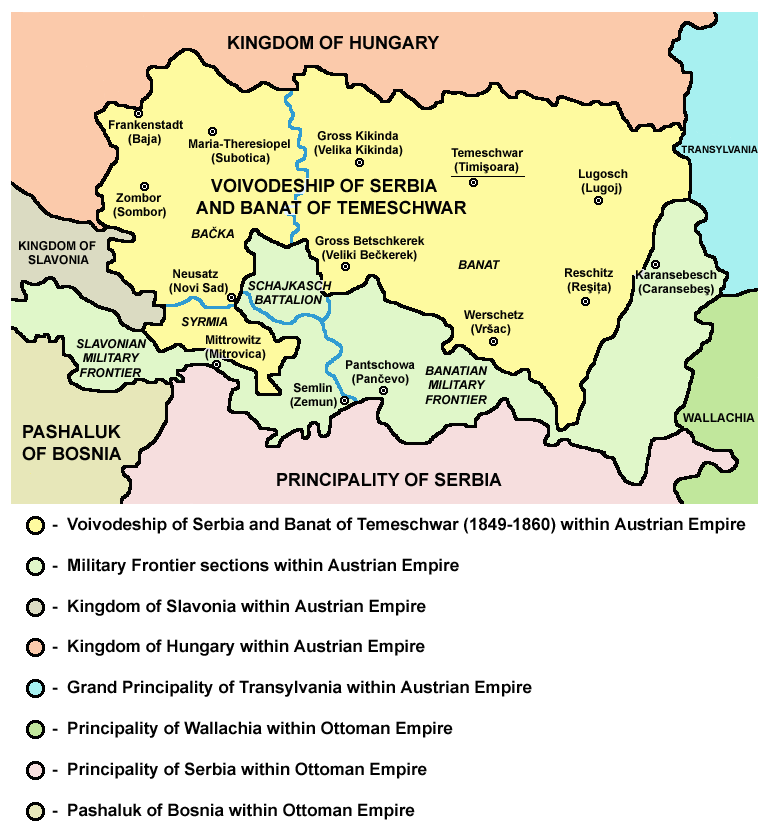
Map of the Banat Military Frontier in 1849

The Banat Military Frontier was dissolved in 1871/72. However, on a transitional basis, the regimental commanders still retained civil authority powers until 1873. Prior to this, the region had been subject to a military administration with its own penal law, which provided for swift procedures and severe punishments. (Note: The Banat Military Frontier was not dissolved without resentment from parts of the population who feared the loss of their privileges. It can also be assumed, however, that many inhabitants of the border region suffered under the strict regime of military administration introduced after the Hungarian Revolution of 1848/49. The special military penal law of the region opened the door to arbitrary and rapid judgments; petitions were permitted only in oral form. Monetary fines as milder punishments did not exist—only imprisonment and corporal punishment. After a verdict was delivered, the delinquent was immediately taken away by a patrol. Life imprisonment or death sentences, however, had to be confirmed by the War Ministry in Vienna.) Although municipal judges were elected, they possessed only limited authority, as they were bound by military law. Under these conditions, Schneider was elected judge of Karlsdorf in 1871. As a civil servant in his thirties, he embodied the transition to bourgeois self-government.

On 12 May 1872, Emperor Franz Joseph I traveled to Weisskirchen to proclaim the dissolution of the Military Frontier. He was accompanied by high-ranking Hungarian politicians and influential legal scholars. The entourage included the Hungarian Prime Minister Count Menyhért Lónyay, the Hungarian Minister of National Defense Gedeon Ráday, as well as the jurists Ferenc Deák and Zsigmond Ormós. They were received locally by the royal commissioner Anton von Scudier. Because Serbian officer circles were offering resistance, Scudier appointed a deputation of 24 Karlsdorf farmers and designated Schneider as spokesman of the German communities of the Banat. (Note: The background to the imperial appearance seems to have been the pronounced resistance within the frontier officer corps to the enforcement of the dissolution decree. Franz Joseph I had apparently been informed that the population of the frontier region opposed the dissolution of the Military Frontier, which is why he wished to come into contact with them. The dissatisfied officers even intended to persuade the Serbian population to send a larger deputation before the monarch to prevent the plan. This, however, was not approved.)

During the visit, confrontations occurred with officers who demanded the continuation of the Military Frontier and were under the command of a general. Schneider, however, resisted the intimidation attempts of the military. (Note: When the festively dressed deputation led by Schneider set out for the emperor's place of residence on 12 May 1872, emotional scenes reportedly occurred. At the Powder Tower of the town of Weisskirchen, 30–40 officers had taken up positions to stop the Banat Swabian deputation by force if necessary. The general commanding the troops forced Schneider to step down from the carriage and aggressively urged the judge to advocate the continuation of the Military Frontier. The general even wanted to put the words of the speech Schneider was to deliver before the monarch into his mouth. Schneider was supposed to make it clear to the emperor that otherwise "blood would flow for blood" if the Military Frontier were dissolved, since the general and his subordinates intended to remain soldiers in any case. After listening to the general, Schneider reportedly replied emphatically: “No! Military rule must come to an end!” This apparently made an impression, as the general reacted with bewilderment and, saying, “For God’s sake, what do you think—the Germans want to be Hungarians,” threw his plumed hat to the ground, allowing the deputation to pass unhindered despite the officers preparing for combat.)

Finally, Schneider was able to proclaim the dissolution of the Military Frontier in the town hall in the form of an ornate speech of thanks to the emperor, whereupon Franz Joseph I publicly confirmed its content. (Note: By about 9:00 am, a large crowd had already gathered in front of the Weisskirchen town hall due to the emperor's arrival. Baron Scudier called out to the people of Karlsdorf from a window, whereupon the officers, who had also taken up positions there, once again allowed the deputation to pass. Scudier arranged the Banat Swabians in the great hall of the town hall, with Schneider at their head, and behind them the Serbian deputation of 54 communities. Scudier reported to the monarch in a side room, after which the latter appeared and Mathias Schneider delivered a speech of thanks for the dissolution of the Military Frontier, which concluded with a confirmation of the decree by the emperor. After Franz Joseph I had returned to his room and signed the "royal order relating to the execution of the dissolution," the assembled Serbian crowd dispersed. It is recorded that Count Lónyay repeatedly patted Schneider on the shoulder "because he played his role well." The proclamation has been preserved verbatim. Mathias Schneider: “Imperial and Royal Majesty! As the representative of the German-speaking inhabitants of the Military Frontier, I appear before the august presence of Your Majesty to give thanks for the great work of reorganizing the Military Frontier and for the most gracious abolition of military administration; henceforth we shall be even more loyal to Your Majesty than we have been until now!” To which His Majesty replied: “Yes, it was done with My consent; I assure My support and My protection to the people of this region henceforth to an even greater extent.”)

== Winding up of the military administration and ceremonial act of 1873 ==
Scudier was now entrusted with winding up the frontier administration. When it officially came to an end on 24 August 1873, those responsible celebrated the successful integration of the Military Frontier into the civil administration with a public ceremonial event. On this occasion, Scudier, Ormós, and Schneider performatively expressed the unity of the military, the nobility, and the former soldier-farmers. (Note: Scudier retired or transferred the officers—also at Schneider's request, as he felt threatened by them. Furthermore, the royal commissioner confiscated the frontier guards’ weapons and abolished the military administration. The final ceremonial act is described as follows: “On this day, at 10:30 a.m., Baron Scudier, Lord Lieutenant Ormós, and many others appeared in the hall of Ewinger’s inn in Karlsdorf, where Baron Scudier, as royal commissioner, delivered a speech to Mathias Schneider on behalf of the frontier guards and to Lord Lieutenant Ormós on behalf of Temes County, and then proclaimed the act of transfer [of the frontier region to the mother country]. Ormós shook Schneider's hand, Baron Scudier saluted with drawn sword and poured out a small glass of wine to seal the contract relating to the transfer of the great landed property, after which the lord and the peasant clinked glasses. Ormós then delivered a splendid speech. At noon, an honorary banquet with 80 place settings took place in Karlsdorf, attended by Franz Bessenyei, Ladislaus Dobó, and many others.") On Scudier's recommendation, Schneider was awarded the Golden Merit Cross with the Crown by the emperor in 1872. He subsequently served as a constitutional judge in Karlsdorf.

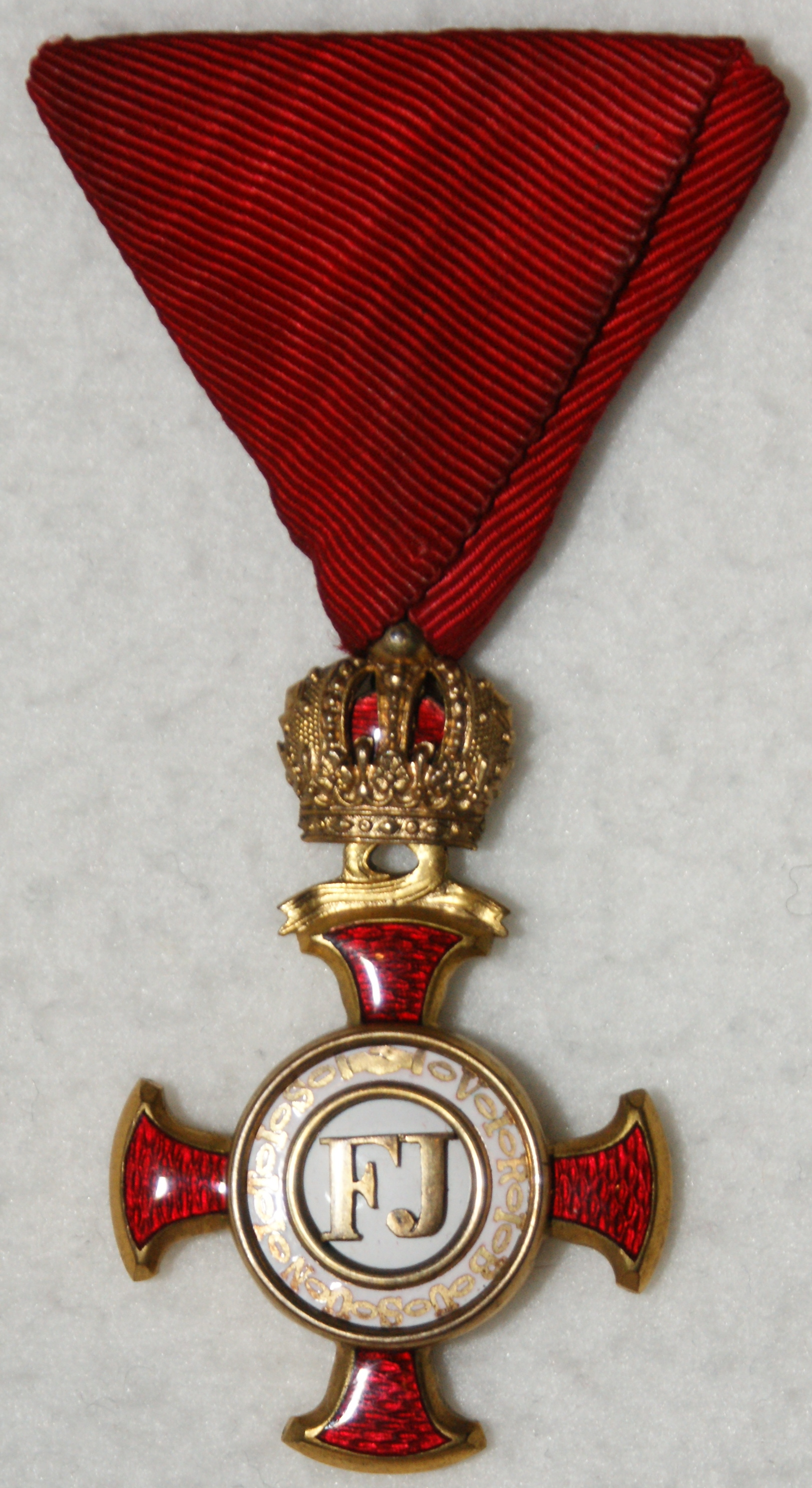

Golden Merit Cross with the Crown
