= State Road 47 (Serbia) =

Road in northern Serbia

State Road 47
- Serbian: Državni put IB reda 47; Serbian Cyrillic: Државни пут IБ реда 47

Route information
- Part of E70
- Maintained by JP "Putevi Srbije"
- Length: 4.727 km (2.937 mi)

Major junctions
- From: Belgrade (printing company)
- To: Belgrade (Bogoslovija)

Location
- Country: Serbia
- Districts: City of Belgrade

Highway system
- Roads in Serbia; Motorways
← 46	→ 10

Expressway 47
- Serbian: Brzi put 47; Serbian Cyrillic: Брзи пут 47
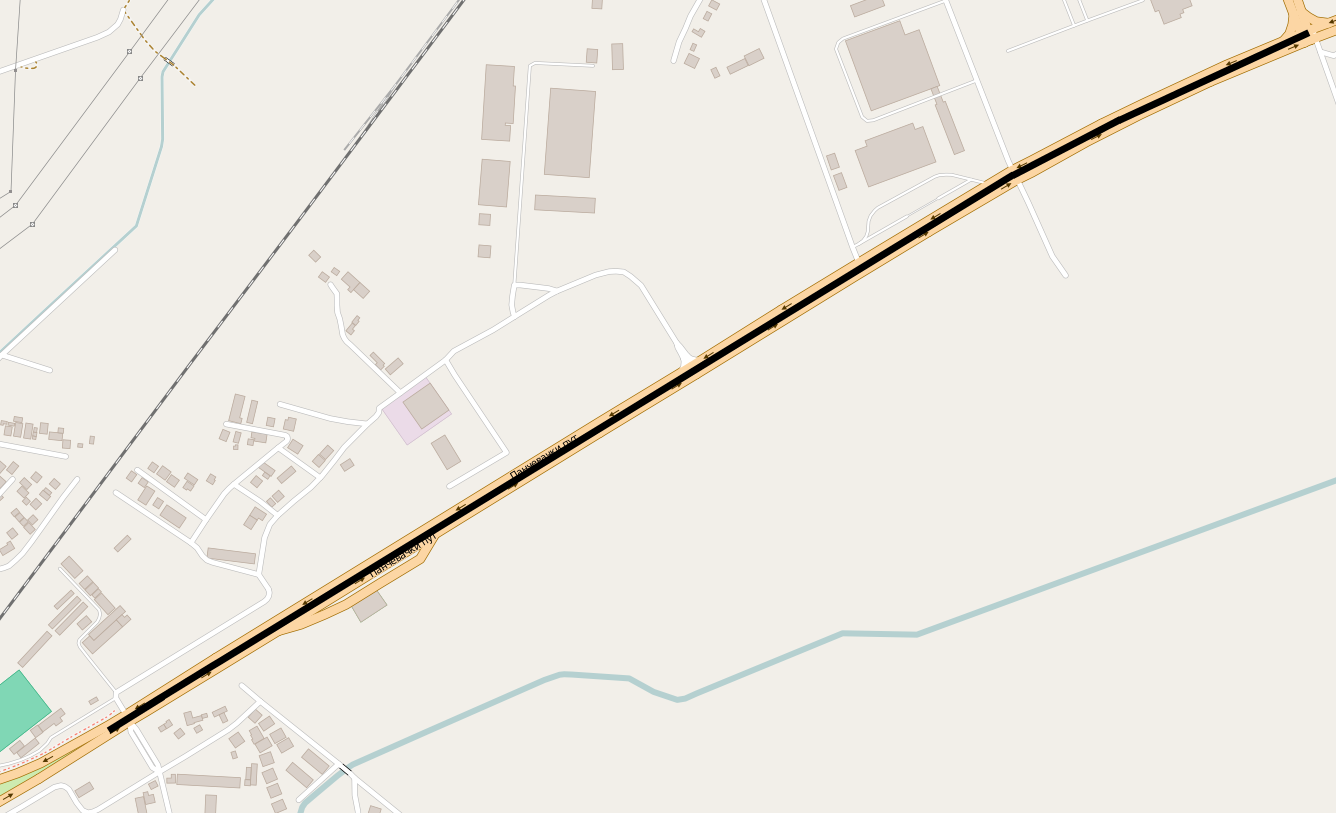

Route information
- Part of E70
- Maintained by JP "Putevi Srbije"
- Length: 2.475 km (1.538 mi)

Major junctions
- From: Belgrade (printing company)
- To: Krnjača interchange

Location
- Country: Serbia
- Districts: City of Belgrade

Highway system
- Roads in Serbia; Motorways
← Expressway 24	→ Expressway 10

State Road 47 is an IB-class road in northern Serbia, connecting the Bogoslovija neighborhood of Belgrade with a printing company on the left side of Danube river. It is located in the City of Belgrade.

Before the new road categorization regulation given in 2013, the route wore the following names: M 1.9 (before 2012) / A3 (after 2012).

The existing route is a main road with four traffic lanes, while the Belgrade (printing company) – Krnjača interchange (Pančevo bridge) section has been built by expressway standards. By the valid Space Plan of Republic of Serbia the road is planned for transferring to the new motorway, which would go side-by-side with the State Road 10.

The road is a part of European route E70.

== Sections ==
Section number	Length	Distance	Section name
04701	2.252 km (1.399 mi)	2.252 km (1.399 mi)	Belgrade (printing company) – Krnjača interchange
04702	2.475 km (1.538 mi)	4.727 km (2.937 mi)	Krnjača interchange – Belgrade (Bogoslovija)

== Planned motorway ==
By the valid Space Plan of Republic of Serbia the motorway construction is planned side-by-side with the existing National Road IB-10. The given section would start at Belgrade bypass (which would include Pančevo from the "Pančevo-north" interchange), and end at the border with Romania. The planned highway would go south of existing route until Alibunar, and then north until Vatin, where it would be connected with Romanian road network. By that, the existing section would be shortened.

== See also ==
- Roads in Serbia
