= The Craftsman (TV series) =

American television series

- Genre: Reality
- Starring: Eric Hollenbeck
- Original language: English
- No. of seasons: 2
- No. of episodes: 18

Production
- Executive producers: Amber Engelmann; Ben Ford; Michael Morgan; Marc Pierce; Chris Richardson; Keith Thomas; Cody Woodside
- Production locations: Eureka, California
- Running time: 25-43 minutes
- Production companies: Warm Springs Productions; Jolt Life

Original release
- Network: Magnolia Network
- Release: September 3, 2021 – November 11, 2023

The Craftsman is an American reality television series produced by Warm Springs Productions and Jolt Life for Magnolia Network in the United States. The series documents the work of Eric Hollenbeck, a conservator-restorer and woodworker from Eureka, California.

The first season of The Craftsman premiered on September 3, 2021. The second season premiered on the Magnolia app and Discovery+ on November 11, 2022. The Craftsman: Preserving the Last Higgins Boat, a documentary special, was released on November 11, 2023.

== Synopsis ==
Eric Hollenbeck, born in Eureka, California, is a co-founder of Blue Ox Millworks (formerly Blue Ox Logging Company), which specializes in lumber and Victorian artisanship.

Hollenbeck takes on preservation projects for various sites and objects of historical value, including the Carson Mansion, Monroe House, and World War II–era landing craft, among other endeavors. The majority of projects on the show involve historic architecture in Eureka.

== Release ==
The first episode of The Craftsman was released on September 3, 2021. The second episode premiered alongside the first on Magnolia Network and Discovery+ on March 15, 2022, with the remainder of the season's following episodes premiering weekly. A back-to-back screening of both episodes was hosted by the City of Eureka on March 18, 2022 at the Eureka Theater, a location featured in the fifth episode of the same season.

In an interview with Lilian Brown for Apartment Therapy, Hollenbeck expressed hope that The Craftsman would provide visibility to Eureka overall. During an episode of the Talk Humboldt podcast with Dr. Keith Flamer (College of the Redwoods) and Dr. Tom Jackson (Cal Poly Humboldt), he described an increase in international visitors to Blue Ox Millworks following the show's release.

== Episodes ==
=== Season 1 ===
The Craftsman
No. overall	No. in season	Title	Original release date
1	1	"Creating the Craftsman"	September 3, 2021
2	2	"Working With Trees"	March 15, 2022
3	3	"Preserving History"	March 22, 2022
4	4	"Building Community"	March 29, 2022
5	5	"Keeping Memories Alive"	April 5, 2022
6	6	"Finding Yourself"	April 12, 2022
7	7	"Importance of Relics"	April 19, 2022
8	8	"Tenacity"	April 26, 2022
9	9	"Teaching a Trade"	May 5, 2022

=== Season 2 ===
The Craftsman
No. overall	No. in season	Title	Original release date
10	1	"Sparking Curiosity"	November 10, 2022
11	2	"Corbels, Columns, and Sustainability"	November 17, 2022
12	3	"Science, Art, and Inspiration"	November 24, 2022
13	4	"The Carson Mansion"	December 1, 2022
14	5	"An Honest Day's Work"	December 8, 2022
15	6	"Traditions"	December 15, 2022
16	7	"Healing PTSD"	December 22, 2022
17	8	"Building a Truss"	December 29, 2022

=== The Craftsman: Preserving the Last Higgins Boat ===
The Craftsman: Preserving the Last Higgins Boat
No. overall	No. in season	Title	Original release date
18	1	"Preserving a Rare Higgins Boat"	November 11, 2023
