= Bogojevo =

Bogojevo Богојево (Serbian) Gombos (Hungarian) Bogojevo (Slovak)
- Village (Selo)
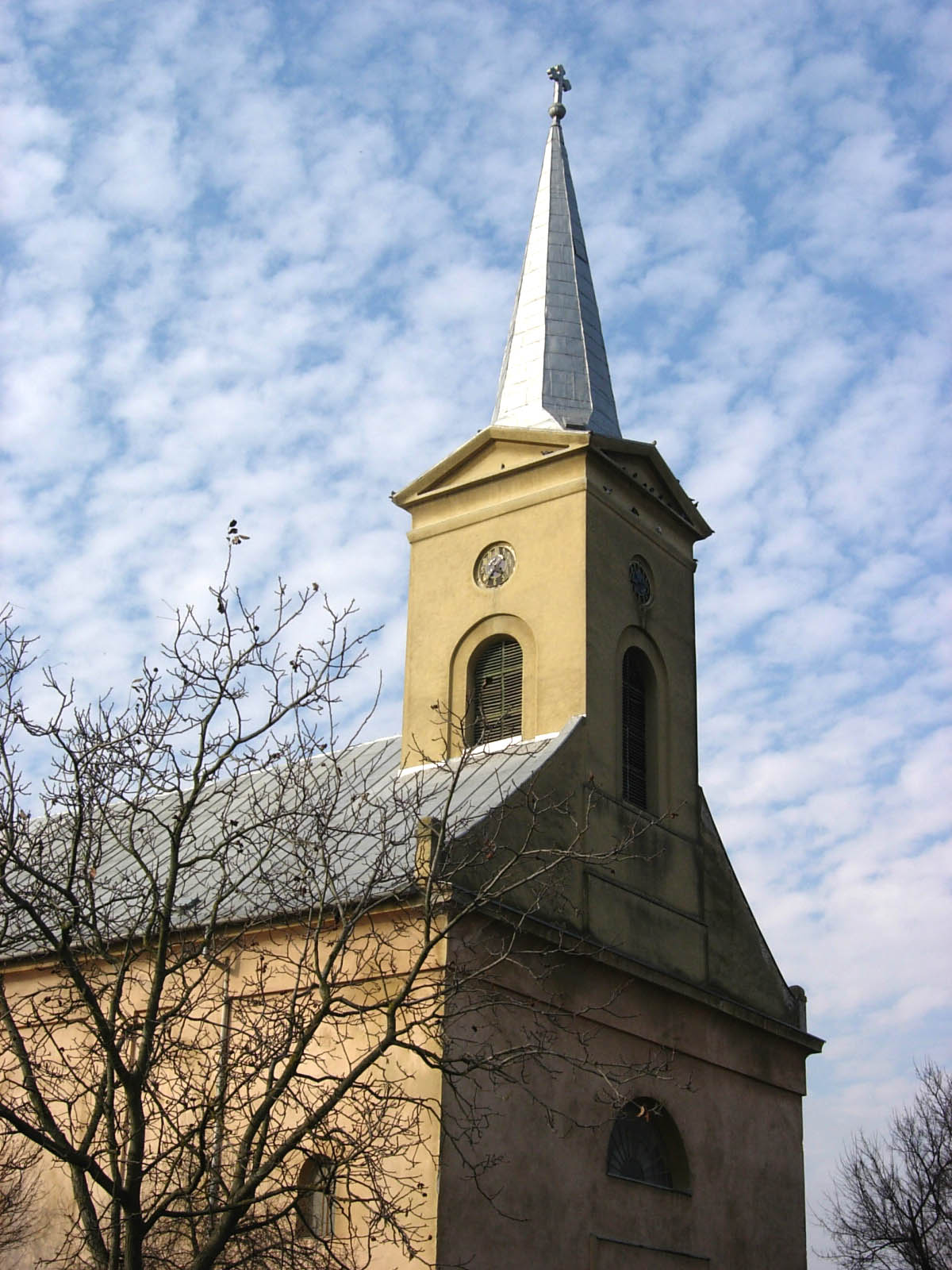
- Saint Ladislaus the King Catholic Church.

- Location within Vojvodina Location within Serbia Location within Europe
- Coordinates: 45°32′N 19°8′E
- Country: Serbia
- Province: Vojvodina
- Region: Bačka (Podunavlje)
- District: West Bačka
- Municipality: Odžaci

Area
  - Total: 38.3 km^{2} (14.8 sq mi)
- Elevation: 86 m (282 ft)

Population (2011)
  - Total: 1,744
  - Density: 45.5/km^{2} (118/sq mi)
- Time zone: UTC+1 (CET)
  - Summer (DST): UTC+2 (CEST)

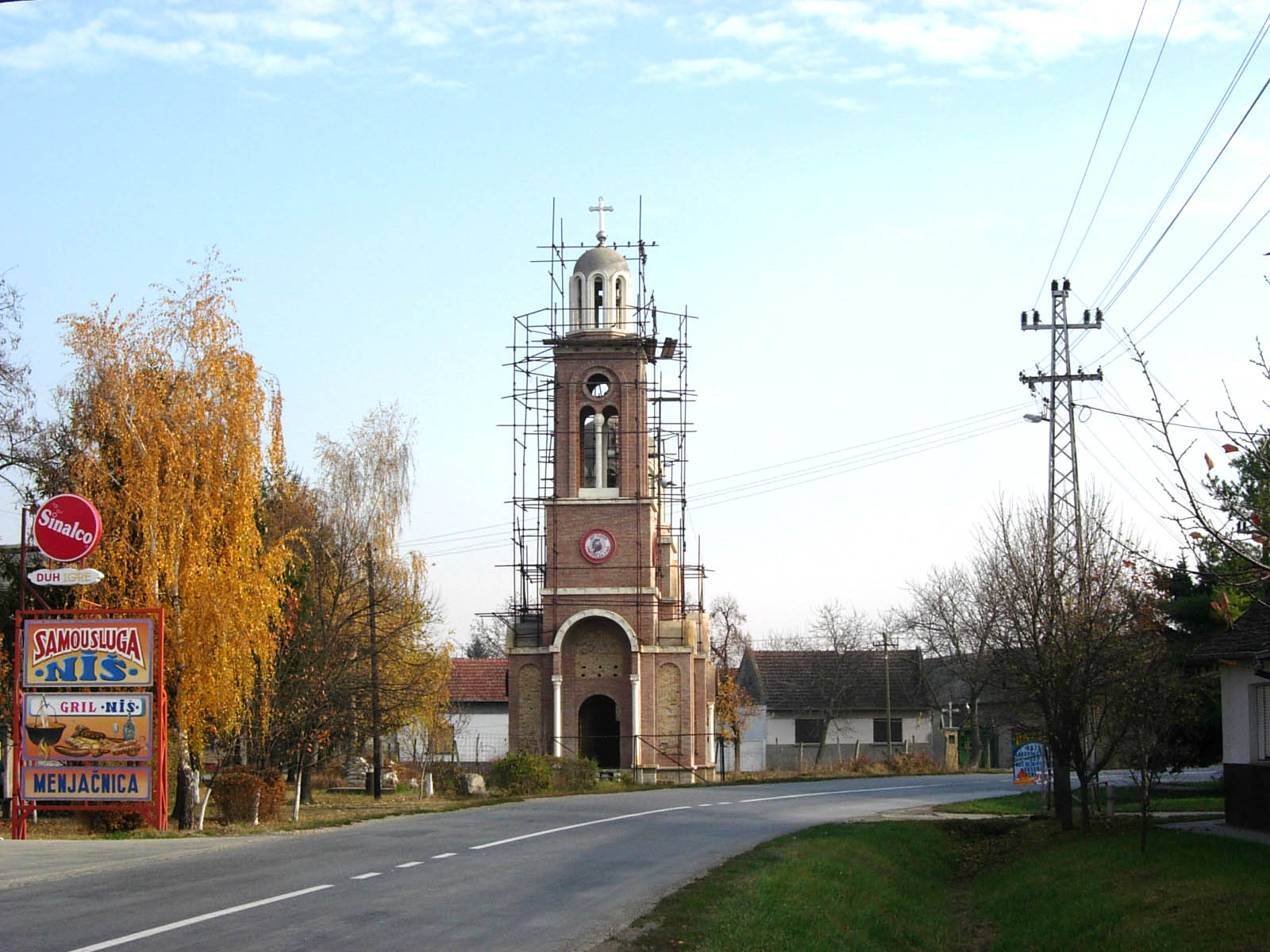
The new Orthodox church.

Bogojevo (Serbian Cyrillic: Богојево; Hungarian: Gombos) is a village located in Odžaci municipality, West Bačka District, Serbia. The village has an ethnic Hungarian majority and its population numbers 1,744 people (as of 2011 census).

== History ==
Graves and ceramics bowls and urns from the Baden culture have been found in Bogojevo.

== Gallery ==
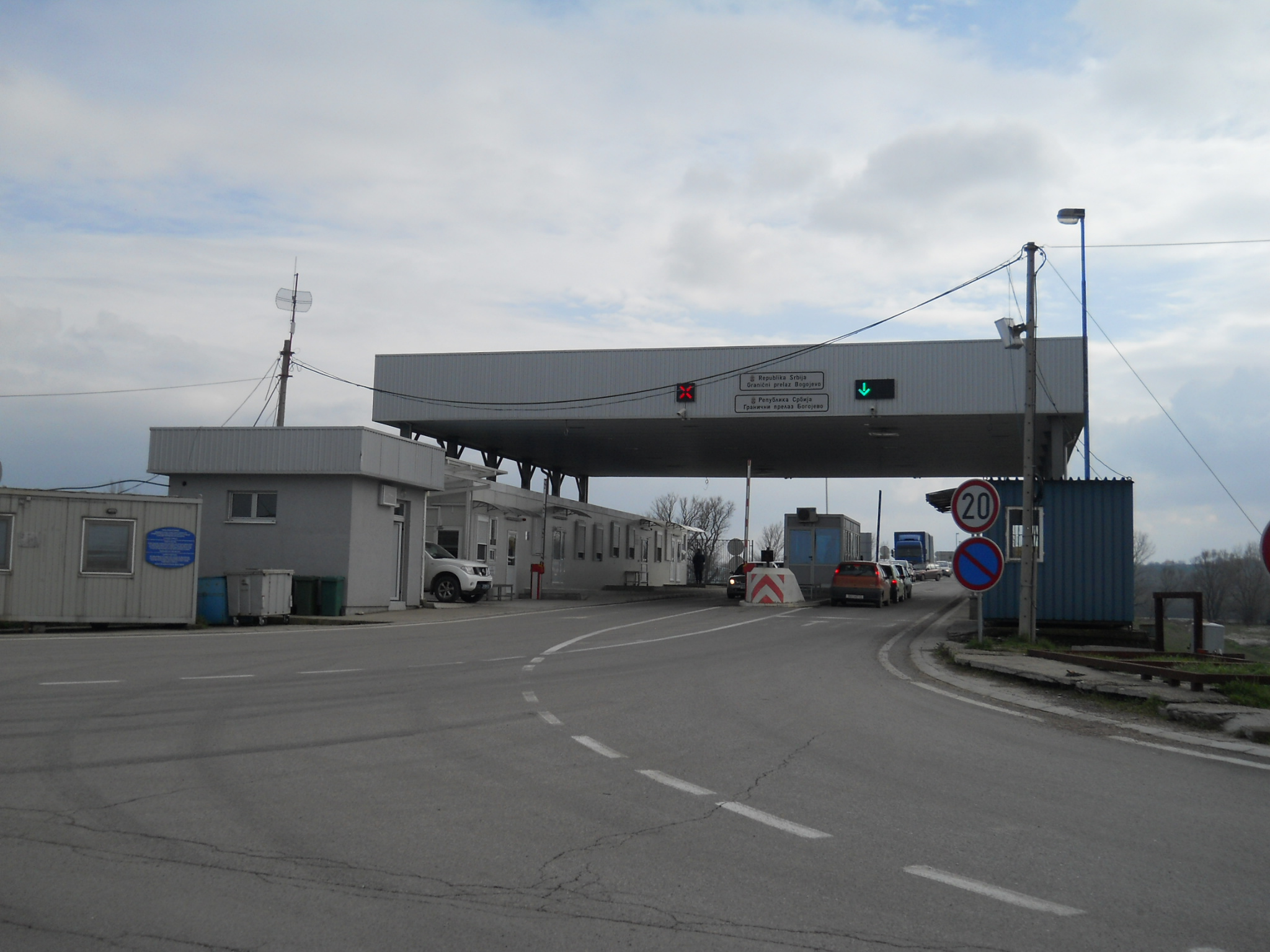
Border Crossing

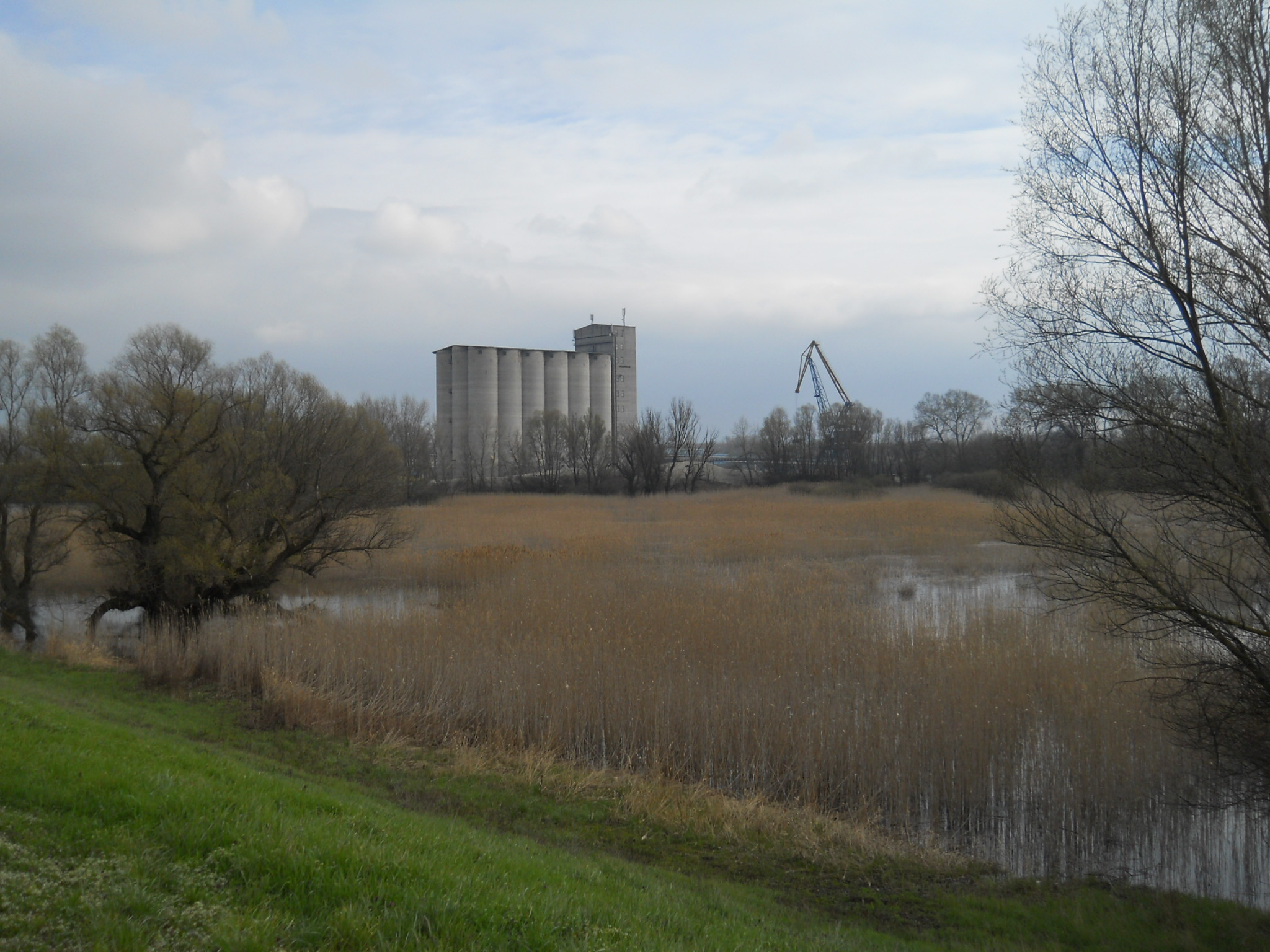
Swampland alongside Danube

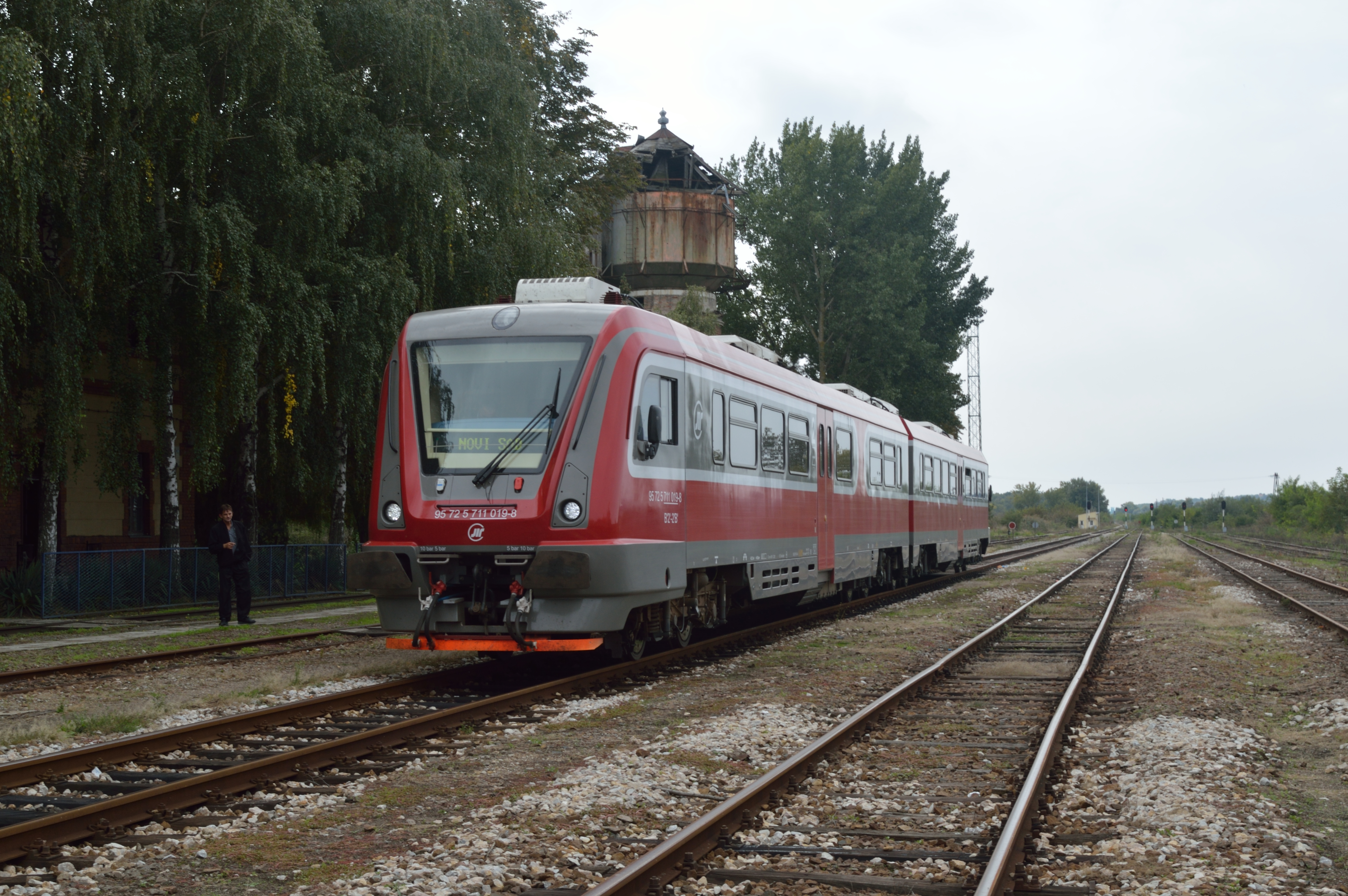
Train Station

== Population ==
- 1961: 3,037
- 1971: 2,874
- 1981: 2,557
- 1991: 2,301

=== Ethnic groups (2002 census) ===
- Hungarians = 1,154 (54.43%)
- Romani = 374 (17.64%)
- Serbs = 287 (13.54%)
- Romanians = 163 (7.69%)
- others.

== See also ==
- List of places in Serbia
- List of cities, towns and villages in Vojvodina
