= Kaluđerovo =

Kaluđerovo Калуђерово
- Village (Selo)
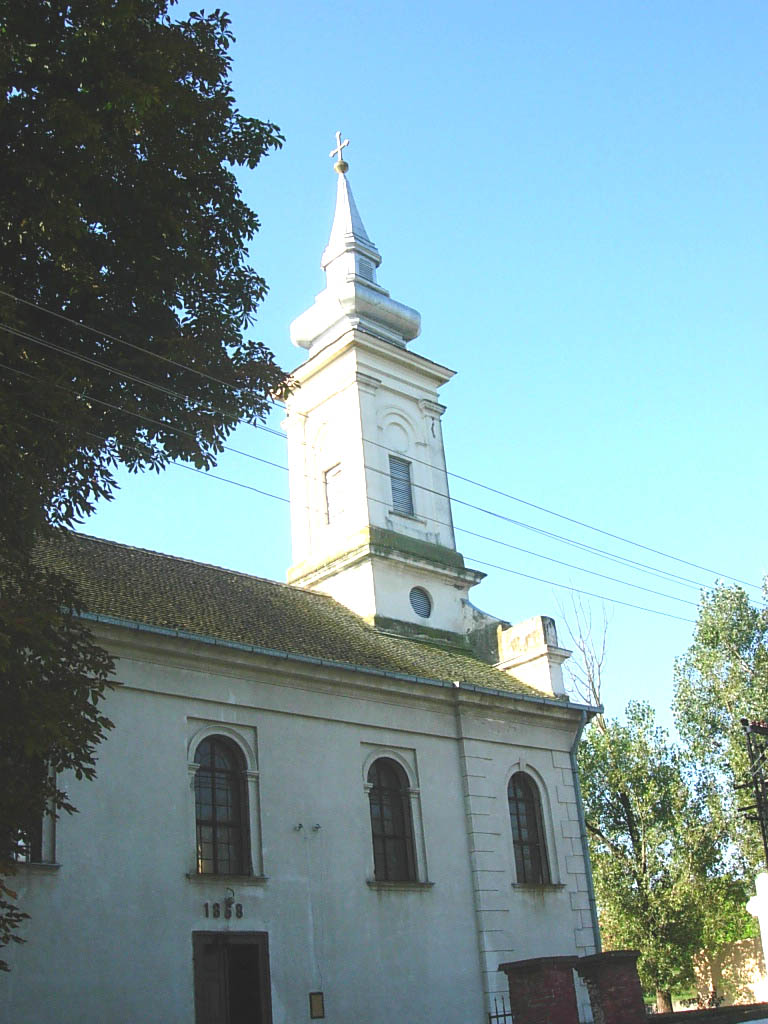
- The Orthodox Church
- Interactive map of Kaluđerovo
- Location of Kaluđerovo within Serbia Kaluđerovo (Serbia) Kaluđerovo (Europe)
- Coordinates: 44°53′34″N 21°33′02″E
- Country: Serbia
- Province: Vojvodina
- District: South Banat
- Municipality: Bela Crkva
- Elevation: 121 m (397 ft)

Population (2002)
  - Kaluđerovo: 132
- Time zone: UTC+1 (CET)
  - Summer (DST): UTC+2 (CEST)
- Area code: +381(0)13
- Car plates: VŠ

Kaluđerovo (Serbian Cyrillic: Калуђерово) is a village in Serbia. It is situated in the Bela Crkva municipality, in the South Banat District, Vojvodina province. The village has a Serb ethnic majority (98.48%) and a population of 132 people (2002 census). This is also a village which lies on the border of Serbia and Romania.
