= Vatin =

Vatin Ватин (Serbian) Versecvát (Hungarian)
- Village (Selo)
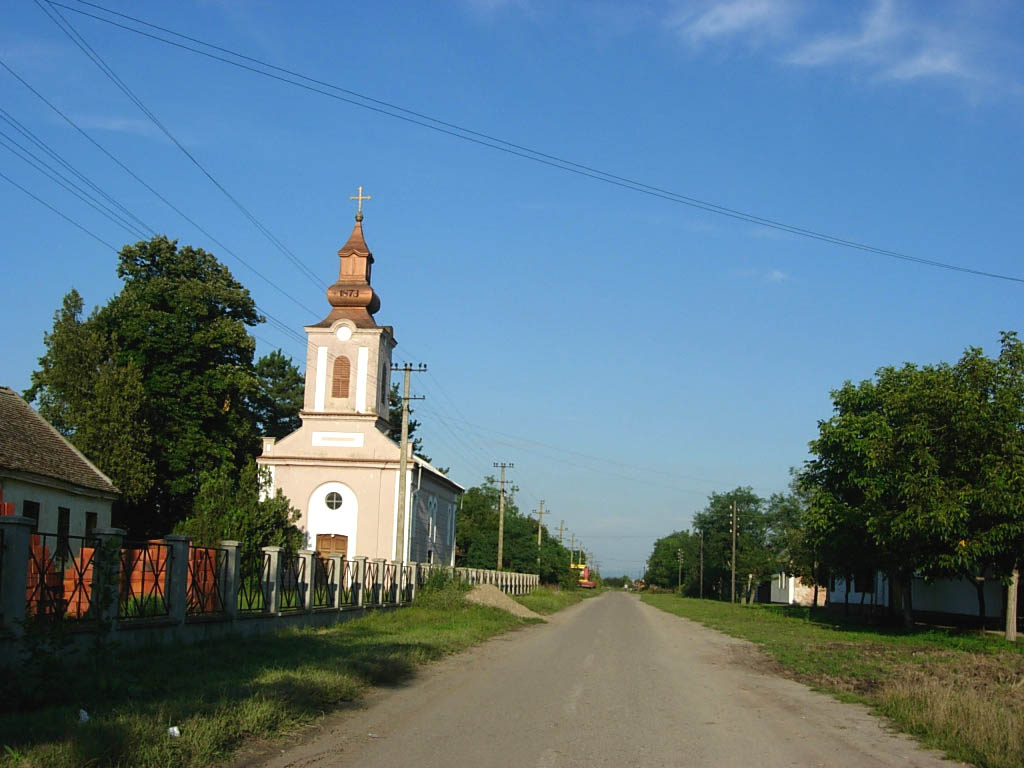
- The main street and the Orthodox Church
- Interactive map of Vatin
- Location of Vatin within Serbia Vatin (Serbia) Vatin (Europe)
- Coordinates: 45°14′03″N 21°14′22″E
- Country: Serbia
- Province: Vojvodina
- District: South Banat
- Municipality: Vršac

Area
  - Vatin: 17.12 km^{2} (6.61 sq mi)
- Elevation: 82 m (269 ft)

Population (2022)
  - Vatin: 128
  - Density: 7.48/km^{2} (19.4/sq mi)
- Time zone: UTC+1 (CET)
  - Summer (DST): UTC+2 (CEST)
- Postal code: 26337
- Area code: +381(0)13
- Car plates: VŠ

Vatin (Serbian Cyrillic: Ватин; Hungarian: Versecvát) is a village located in the municipality of Vršac, Serbia. A border crossing between Serbia and Romania is located in the village. The village has a Serb ethnic majority (53.2%) with a sizable Hungarian minority (26.8%) and its population numbers 128 inhabitants (2022 census).

== Name ==
In Serbian, the village is known as Vatin (Ватин), in Hungarian as Versecvát, and in German as Wattin.

== History ==
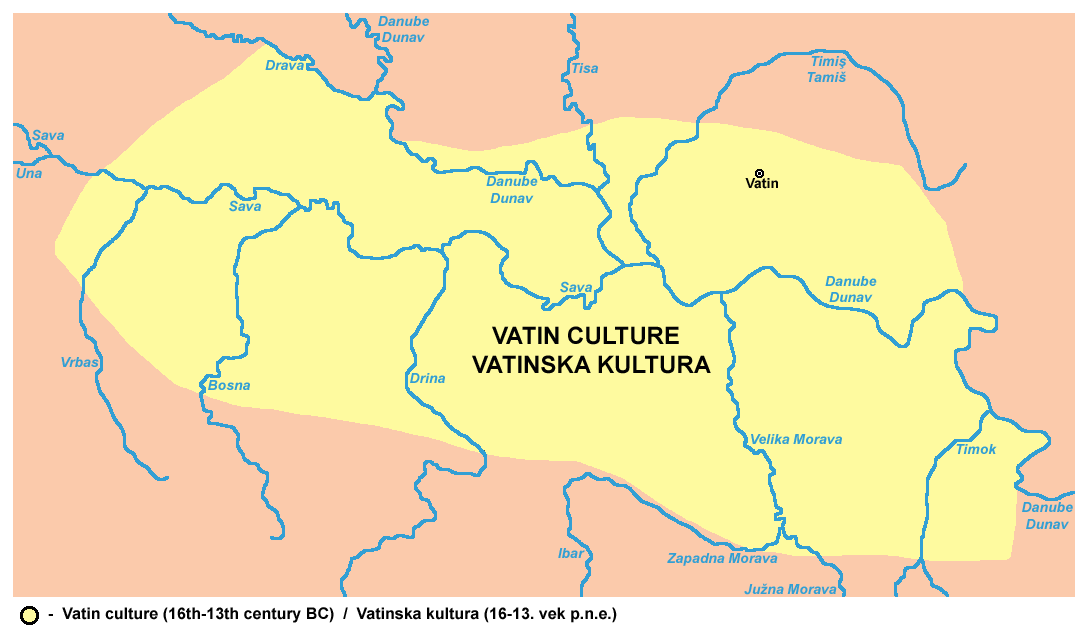
Area of Vatin culture

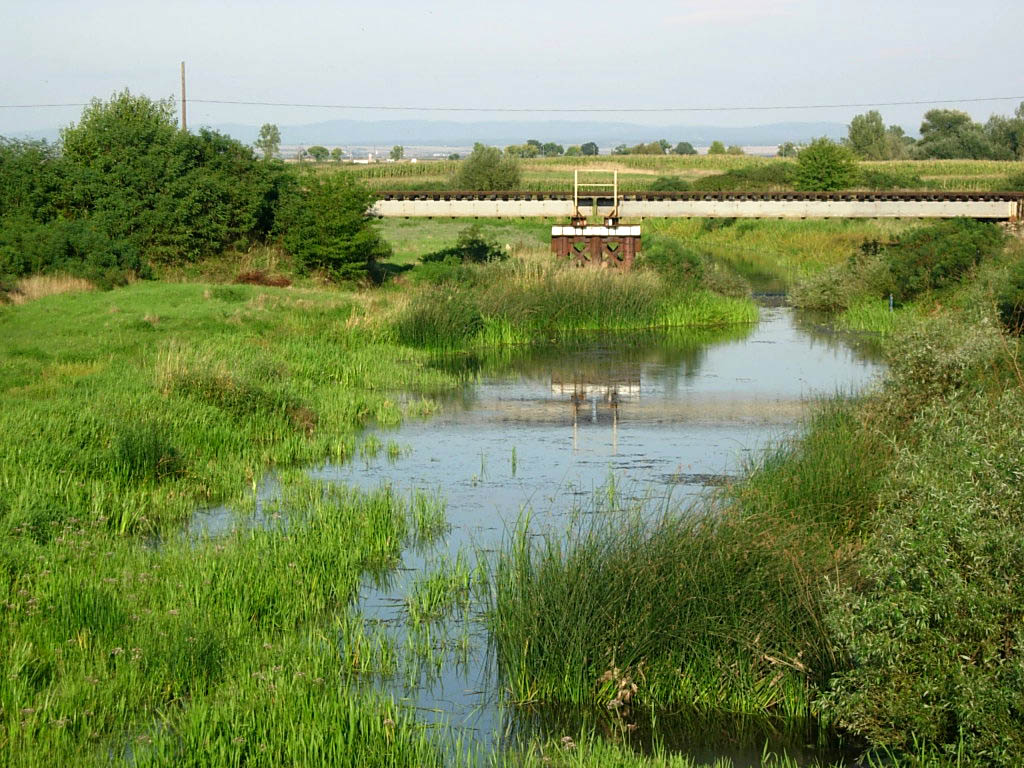
The Moravica River near Vatin

Bronze Age graves of south Russian steppe nomads were found in the village, as well as 14th century BC duck-shaped vases.

== Vatin circles ==
Just outside the village there are Vatin circles that were estimated to belong to the Vinča culture.

== Historical population ==
- 1961: 553
- 1971: 489
- 1981: 417
- 1991: 316
- 2002: 250
- 2011: 239
- 2022: 128

== See also ==
- List of places in Serbia
- List of cities, towns and villages in Vojvodina
