= Devojački Bunar =

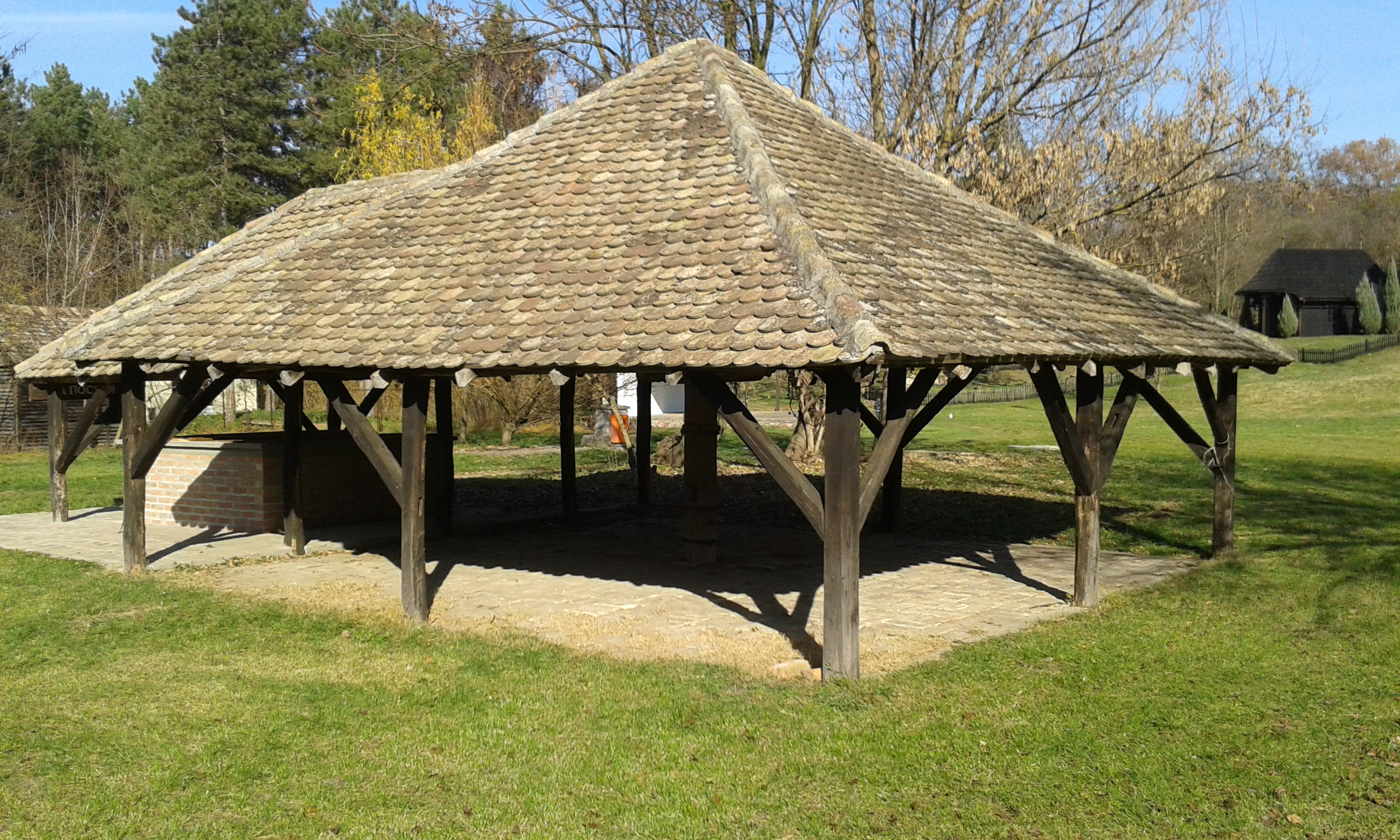
The picnic area in Devojački Bunar

Devojački Bunar (Serbian Cyrillic: Девојачки Бунар) is a small settlement in Serbia. It is situated in the Alibunar municipality, South Banat District, Vojvodina province. Officially, Devojački Bunar is not classified as a separate settlement, but as part of the town of Banatski Karlovac, and therefore it is not included in the census measurements.
