= Banatski Karlovac =

Banatski Karlovac Банатски Карловац
- Town
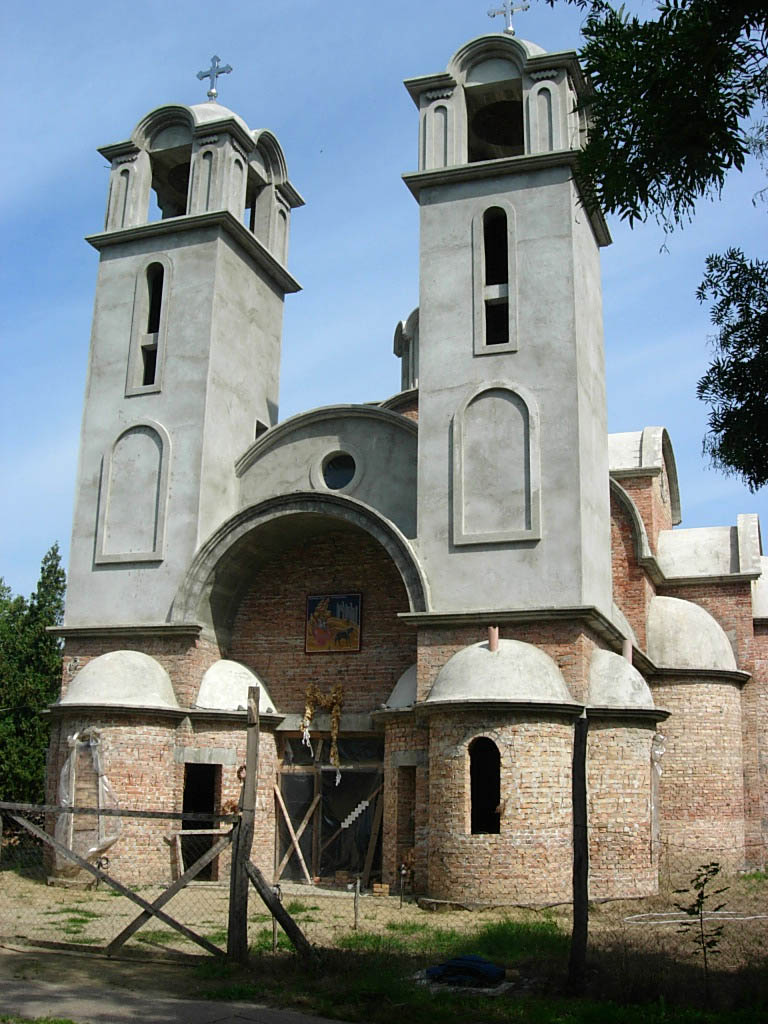
- The new Orthodox church

- Location of Banatski Karlovac within Serbia Banatski Karlovac (Serbia) Banatski Karlovac (Europe)
- Coordinates: 45°03′N 21°01′E
- Country: Serbia
- Province: Vojvodina
- District: South Banat District
- Municipality: Alibunar
- Elevation: 99 m (325 ft)

Population (2002)
  - Total: 5,820
- Postal code: 26320
- Area code: + 381(0)13
- Vehicle registration: PA
- Website: banatskikarlovac.rs

Banatski Karlovac (Serbian Cyrillic: Банатски Карловац) is a town located in the Alibunar Municipality, in the South Banat District of Serbia. It is situated in the Autonomous Province of Vojvodina. The town has a Serb ethnic majority and its population numbers 5,820 people (2002 census). The nearby settlement of Devojački Bunar is also officially part of Banatski Karlovac.

== Name ==
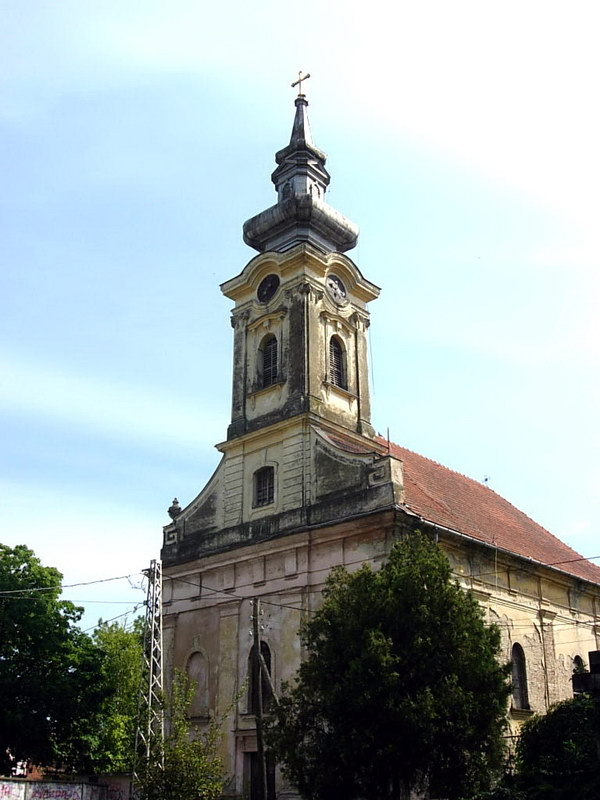
Roman Catholic church of Saint Charles

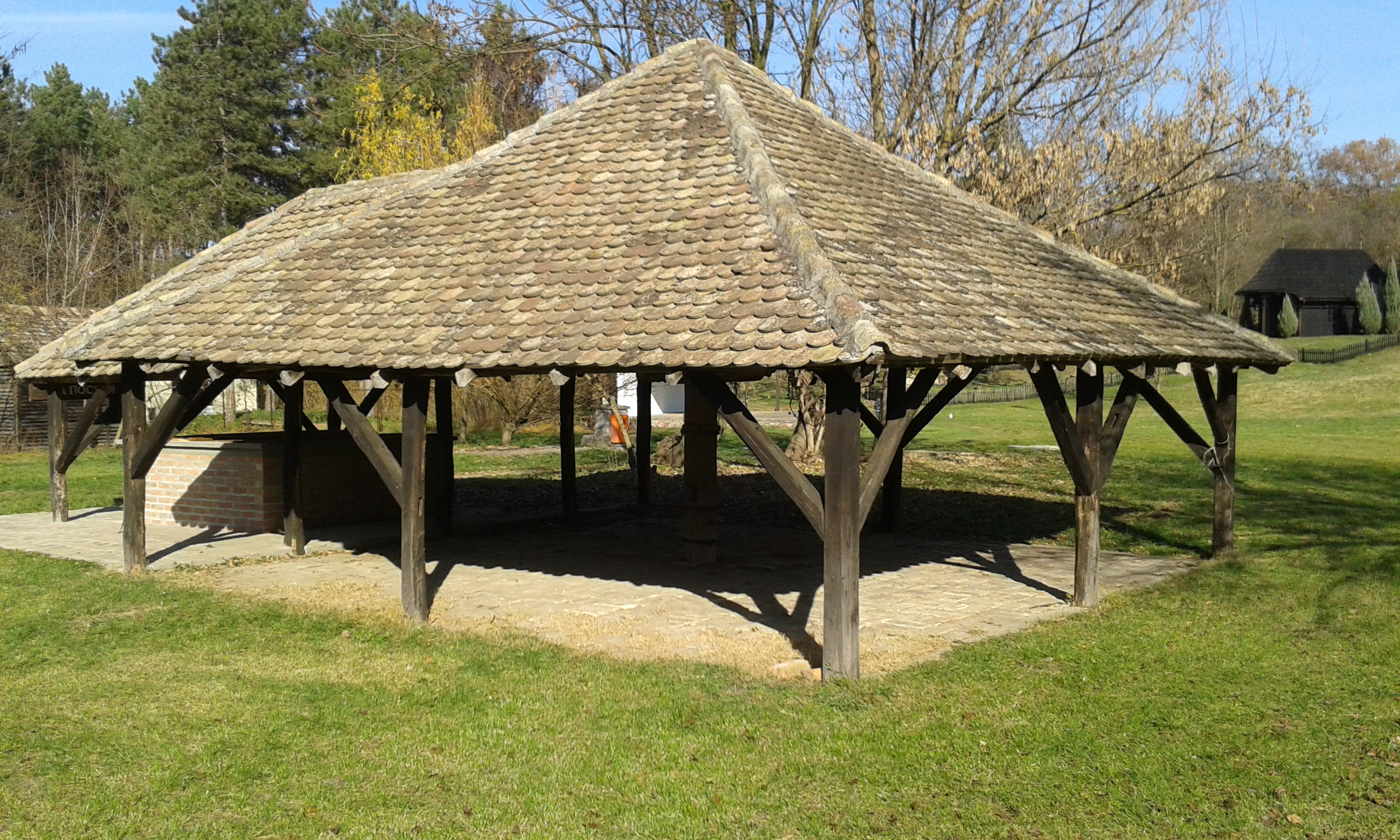
The picnic area in Devojački Bunar

In Serbian, the town is known as Banatski Karlovac (Банатски Карловац), in German as Karlsdorf, and in Hungarian as Nagykárolyfalva. Adjective "Banatski" (i.e. "Banatian") was given to differentiate the town from the city of Karlovac in Croatia.

== History ==
This area was inhabited by humans during the Bronze Age, as well as in the 3rd and 4th century AD. During the Ottoman administration, settlement named Hoča or Oča existed at this location. Settlement named Oča was also mentioned in 1764. During the 18th century, the settlement was populated by Serbs.

Ethnic Germans settled in the settlement starting in 1803, and in the same year some Slavic Krašovani settlers from eastern Banat settled here as well. In 1921, name of the settlement was Karlovo Selo, and in 1926, it was officially named Banatski Karlovac. In the same year, the reading room was founded and monument dedicated to Serbs killed in 1848 revolution was built.

Before the end of World War II, most of the inhabitants of this town were ethnic Germans. After the war, their property was confiscated by the state and Germans were expelled or killed in concentration camps run by Yugoslav communist authorities (Aktion Intelligenzija in Karlsdorf). A German Lutheran church was razed off soon after the expulsion of Germans.

After the war, 615 (mostly Serb) families with 3,775 family members settled in the town. They originated from Central Serbia, Bosnia and Montenegro, mostly from area around Užice and Čačak. Some settlers were not satisfied with life conditions in the town, so about 80 families returned to their place of origin. In 1949, town was named Banatsko Rankovićevo, and this name was in use until 1956, when old name Banatski Karlovac was returned.

== Historical population ==
Historical population
Year	Pop.	±%
1961	6,025	—
1971	6,273	+4.1%
1981	6,319	+0.7%
1991	6,450	+2.1%

== Notable citizens ==
The Banat Swabian judge Mathias Schneider (1834–1917), the dialect researcher and folklorist Hans Hagel (1888–1942), the publicist and publisher Hans Sonnleitner (1931–2021), as well as musicians Nikola Čuturilo (* 1962) and Lacku (1998) were born in Banatski Karlovac.

== Climate ==
Climate data for ?
Month	Jan	Feb	Mar	Apr	May	Jun	Jul	Aug	Sep	Oct	Nov	Dec	Year
Mean daily maximum °C (°F)	4.1 (39.4)	6.8 (44.2)	12.6 (54.7)	18.7 (65.7)	23.5 (74.3)	27.1 (80.8)	29.1 (84.4)	29.6 (85.3)	24.2 (75.6)	18.4 (65.1)	11.6 (52.9)	5.2 (41.4)	17.6 (63.7)
Mean daily minimum °C (°F)	−2.4 (27.7)	−1.3 (29.7)	2.1 (35.8)	6.9 (44.4)	11.5 (52.7)	14.8 (58.6)	15.9 (60.6)	15.8 (60.4)	11.8 (53.2)	7.2 (45.0)	3.4 (38.1)	−0.9 (30.4)	7.1 (44.7)
Average precipitation mm (inches)	37 (1.5)	34 (1.3)	36 (1.4)	49 (1.9)	67 (2.6)	78 (3.1)	80 (3.1)	55 (2.2)	56 (2.2)	52 (2.0)	42 (1.7)	45 (1.8)	631 (24.8)
Mean monthly sunshine hours	70	99	163	205	250	280	310	299	207	164	97	61	2,205
Source: Republic Hydrometeorological Service of Serbia

== See also ==
- List of places in Serbia
- List of cities, towns and villages in Vojvodina
