= Straža, Vršac =

Straža Стража (Serbian) Straja (Romanian)
- Village (Selo)
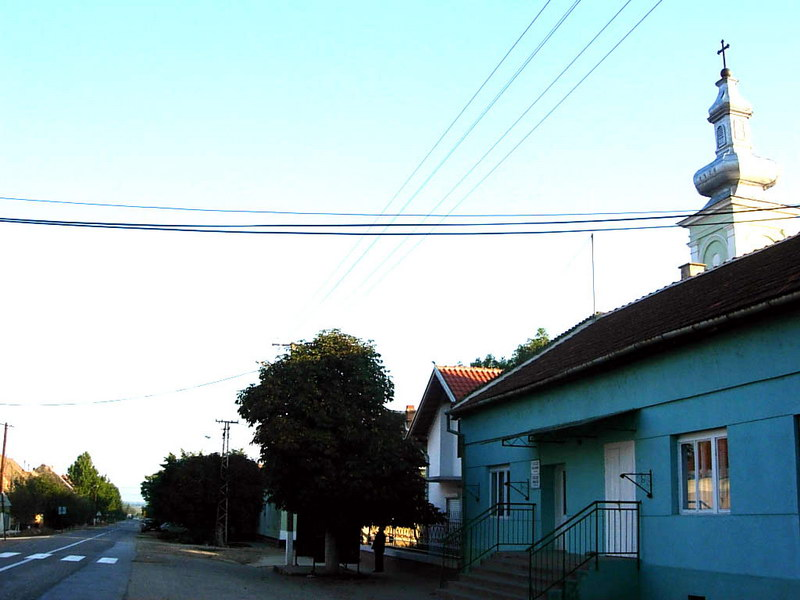
- The main street and the Romanian Orthodox church

- Location of Straža within Serbia Straža (Serbia) Straža (Europe)
- Coordinates: 44°58′16″N 21°18′02″E
- Country: Serbia
- Province: Vojvodina
- District: South Banat
- Municipality: Vršac
- Elevation: 79 m (259 ft)

Population (2022)
  - Total: 490
- Time zone: UTC+1 (CET)
  - Summer (DST): UTC+2 (CEST)
- Postal code: 26345
- Area code: +381(0)13
- Car plates: VŠ

Straža (Serbian Cyrillic: Стража; Romanian: Straja; Hungarian: Temesőr) is a village located in the administrative area of the City of Vršac, South Banat District, Vojvodina, Serbia. The village has a population numbering 490 people (2022 census).

== Name ==
In Serbian, the village is known as Straža (Стража), in Romanian as Straja, in Hungarian as Strázsa (later Temesőr), and in German as Lagerdorf.

== History ==
Straža was established in the winter of 1716–17 by the Austrian imperial army as a base for soldiers sent to protect the town of Palanka from the advancing Ottoman troops. After the army was recalled, several soldiers and artisans remained to form the settlement of Lagerdorf. The historian Borovski confirms that after the Ottomans were expelled, the settlement was colonized by Germans. By 1734, the settlement already had its own post office and a German mill was built near the Karaš River.

By 1744, Romanian settlers began to move into the settlement mostly from the Oltenia province in lesser Wallachia. By 1782, the settlement's population swelled to over 1,000 people, 917 of which were Eastern Orthodox. It was controlled by the Ottomans between 1787–88.

In October 1848, Serbian troops from Alibunar were stationed in the settlement because of the advancing Hungarian troops. The Serb army was nearly destroyed by Hungarian troops under the leadership of the general Jovan Damjanić (a Serb by origin). As a reprisal, almost the village's entire population was executed, along with their domestic animals.

In 1880, Lagerdorf was renamed Straža (Straja in Romanian) and was referred to as Temes-Strazsa by the Hungarians in 1894 and Temesor in 1911. Name Straža itself is of Serbian origin (meaning "sentinel").

In 1854, the settlement's population was 1,195, in 1869, it reached 1,242, in 1880, the population was 1,510, in 1900 it was 1,606, and by 1910 the population was 1,678. During World War I, 70 soldiers from Straža lost their lives. In 1921, a total of 1,482 people lived in the settlement: 1,389 Romanians, 17 Serbs, 14 Hungarians, 10 Germans, and 52 others of various nationalities.

== Demographics ==
=== Historical population ===
- 1961: 1,393
- 1971: 1,254
- 1981: 1,207
- 1991: 1,107
- 2002: 693
- 2011: 538
- 2022: 490

=== Ethnic groups ===
According to data from the 2022 census, ethnic groups in the village include:

- 332 (67.7%) Romanians
- 75 (15.3%) Serbs
- 53 (10.8%) Roma
- Others/Undeclared/Unknown

=== Religion ===
The Eastern Orthodox Church in Straža was originally built in 1854 but was not in use until 1856 when the priest Stefan Popović was present. The interior was restored in 1935 by Karl and Josef Löffler while Ion Mităr was cleric. Jon Mităr served in Straža as chaplain until May 1943. He was succeeded by Ioan Ivașcu in June of the same year. From 1948 until 1978, Corneliu Șdicu served as chaplain. Moise Janeș became chaplain in 1979 and still serves today.

== See also ==
- List of places in Serbia
- List of cities, towns and villages in Vojvodina
