= Craftsman Book Company =

American technical reference publishing company

- Status: Active
- Country of origin: United States
- Headquarters location: Carlsbad, California
- Publication types: Books and online
- Nonfiction topics: Technical references for builders, estimation software
- Official website: craftsman-book.com

Craftsman Book Company is a U.S. publisher with a comprehensive range of technical references for construction professionals. The company is based in Carlsbad, California.

== History ==
The company was founded in 1952-1953 as Cal Pacific Builders in a partnership between a construction contractor and a civil engineer. The first book it published was the California Home Estimator in 1953.

== Product lines ==
As well as books the company publishes building estimation software on CD and online.
