= Vlajkovac =

Vlajkovac Влајковац (Serbian) Temesvajkóc (Hungarian) Vlaicovăț (Romanian)
- Village (Selo)
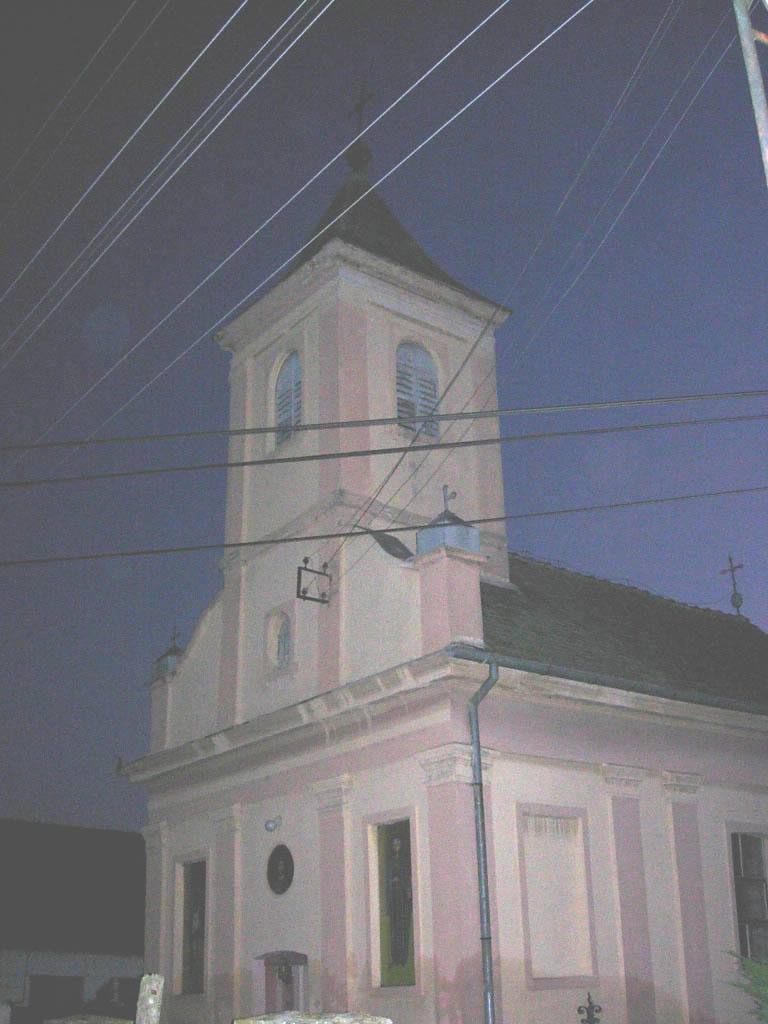
- The Orthodox Church

- Location of Vlajkovac within Serbia Vlajkovac (Serbia) Vlajkovac (Europe)
- Coordinates: 45°04′17″N 21°12′01″E
- Country: Serbia
- Province: Vojvodina
- District: South Banat
- Municipality: Vršac
- Elevation: 80 m (260 ft)

Population (2002)
  - Vlajkovac: 1,178
- Time zone: UTC+1 (CET)
  - Summer (DST): UTC+2 (CEST)
- Postal code: 26332
- Area code: +381(0)13
- Car plates: VŠ

Vlajkovac (Serbian Cyrillic: Влајковац; Hungarian: Temesvajkóc; Romanian: Vlaicovăț) is a village in Serbia. It is situated in the Vršac municipality, in the South Banat District, Vojvodina province.

== Name ==
In Serbian, the village is known as Vlajkovac (Влајковац), in Romanian as Vlaicovăț, in Hungarian as Temesvajkóc, and in German as Wlajkowatz.

== History ==
Bronze Age graves of south Russian steppe nomads were found in the village. Just outside the village there are Vlajkovac circles that have a diameter of around 300 meters and are considered to belong to the Vinča neolithic culture. Vlajkovac circles have been plowed over several times and now only their outlines are visible. They are visible from satellites.

== Ethnic groups (2002 census) ==
The village has a Serb ethnic majority with a seizable Romanian and Hungarian minority and its population numbering 1,178 people (2002 census).

- Serbs = 656 (55.68%)
- Romanians = 288 (24.44%)
- Hungarians = 182 (15.44%)
- Yugoslavs = 16

== Population history ==
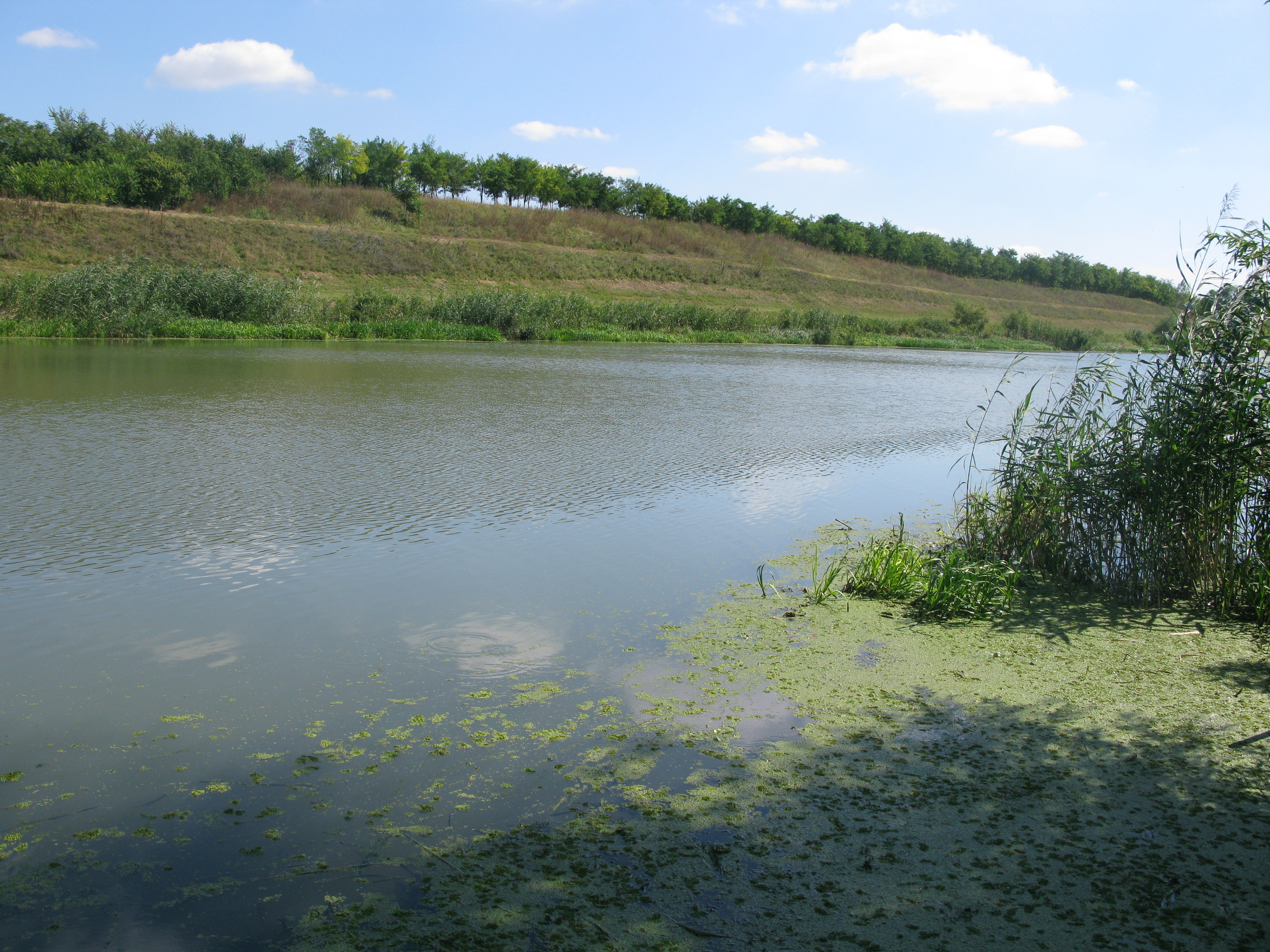
The DTD (Danube-Tisa-Danube) channel at village Vlajkovac.

- 1961: 1,855
- 1971: 1,530
- 1981: 1,356
- 1991: 1,328
- 2002: 1,178

== See also ==
- List of places in Serbia
- List of cities, towns and villages in Vojvodina
