= National Road (M)1 (Serbia) =

Road in Serbia

National Road (M)1
- Serbian: Magistralni put (M)1; Serbian Cyrillic: Магистрални пут (М)1
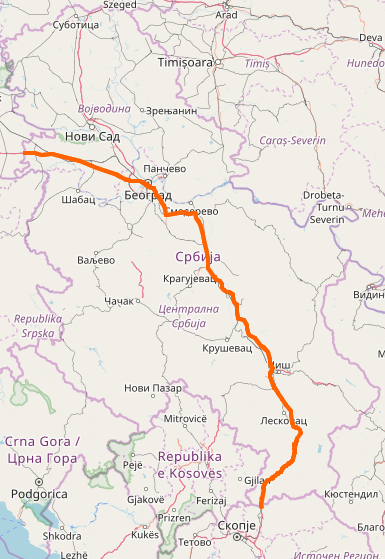

Route information
- Part of E70 / E75
- Maintained by JP "Putevi Srbije"
- Length: 494.3 km (307.1 mi)

Major junctions
- From: A3 / E70 at Croatia–Serbia border at Batrovci

- To: A-1 / E75 at Serbia–North Macedonia border at Tabanovce

Location
- Country: Serbia
- Districts: Srem, City of Belgrade, Podunavlje, Šumadija, Pomoravlje, Rasina, Nišava, Jablanica, Pčinja

Highway system
- Roads in Serbia; Motorways
← M25.3	→ M1.9

National Road 1 (alternatively marked as M-1, M1 and M 1), was a road in Serbia, connecting Croatia at Batrovci with North Macedonia at Tabanovce. The route was a part of a notably larger motorway which existed during SFR Yugoslavia, generally known as Brotherhood and Unity Highway (Serbian: Аутопут "Братство и јединство"/ Autoput "Bratstvo i jedinstvo"; Croatian: Autocesta "Bratstvo i jedinstvo"), therefore considered as the most important route in Serbia.

After the new road categorization regulation given in 2013, the route bears designations A3 and A1. The road was a dual-carriageway motorway.

== Sections ==
Section number	Length	Distance	Section name
2000/2001	8.6 km (5.3 mi)	8.6 km (5.3 mi)	Croatia – Serbia border at Batrovci – Adaševci
2002/2003	13.5 km (8.4 mi)	22.1 km (13.7 mi)	Adaševci – Kuzmin 1 (Sremska Rača)
2004/2005	21.3 km (13.2 mi)	43.4 km (27.0 mi)	Kuzmin 1 (Sremska Rača) – Sremska Mitrovica 1 (Sremska Mitrovica)
2006/2007	13.7 km (8.5 mi)	57.1 km (35.5 mi)	Sremska Mitrovica 1 (Sremska Mitrovica) – Ruma 1 (to Ruma)
2008/2009	13.0 km (8.1 mi)	70.1 km (43.6 mi)	Ruma 1 (to Ruma) – Pećinci 1 (to Pećinci)
2010/2011	14.0 km (8.7 mi)	84.1 km (52.3 mi)	Pećinci 1 (to Pećinci) – Šimanovci
2012/2013	3.2 km (2.0 mi)	87.3 km (54.2 mi)	Šimanovci – Vojvodina border (Šimanovci)
0001/1179	4.6 km (2.9 mi)	91.9 km (57.1 mi)	Vojvodina border (Šimanovci) – to Dobanovci
0002/1178	5.3 km (3.3 mi)	97.2 km (60.4 mi)	to Dobanovci – Belgrade Nikola Tesla Airport
0003/1177	6.8 km (4.2 mi)	104.0 km (64.6 mi)	Belgrade Nikola Tesla Airport – Belgrade (Novi Sad)
0218/1176	2.9 km (1.8 mi)	106.9 km (66.4 mi)	Belgrade (Novi Sad) – Belgrade (Tošin Bunar) (overlap with)
0219/1175	4.9 km (3.0 mi)	111.8 km (69.5 mi)	Belgrade (Tošin Bunar) – Belgrade (Mostar interchange) (overlap with)
0006/1174	1.7 km (1.1 mi)	113.5 km (70.5 mi)	Belgrade (Mostar interchange) – Belgrade (Autokomanda)
0007/1173	9.6 km (6.0 mi)	123.1 km (76.5 mi)	Belgrade (Autokomanda) – Bubanj Potok
0071/1172	4.9 km (3.0 mi)	128.0 km (79.5 mi)	Bubanj Potok – "Tranšped" interchange
0008/1171	4.4 km (2.7 mi)	132.4 km (82.3 mi)	"Tranšped" interchange – Vrčin
0009/1170	14.3 km (8.9 mi)	146.7 km (91.2 mi)	Vrčin – Mali Požarevac
0010/1169	6.5 km (4.0 mi)	153.2 km (95.2 mi)	Mali Požarevac – Umčari
0011/1168	2.8 km (1.7 mi)	156.0 km (96.9 mi)	Umčari – Vodanj
0011/1168	3.1 km (1.9 mi)	159.1 km (98.9 mi)	Vodanj – Kolari
0012/1167	11.9 km (7.4 mi)	171.0 km (106.3 mi)	Kolari – Ralja (Smederevo)
0013/1166	1.5 km (0.93 mi)	172.5 km (107.2 mi)	Ralja (Smederevo) – Ralja (Požarevac)
0014/1165	28.4 km (17.6 mi)	200.9 km (124.8 mi)	Ralja (Požarevac) – Velika Plana
0015/1164	12.0 km (7.5 mi)	212.9 km (132.3 mi)	Velika Plana – Markovac
0016/1163	6.4 km (4.0 mi)	219.3 km (136.3 mi)	Markovac – Lapovo
0017/1162	3.8 km (2.4 mi)	223.1 km (138.6 mi)	Lapovo – Batočina
0018/1161	21.9 km (13.6 mi)	245.0 km (152.2 mi)	Batočina – Jagodina (interchange)
0019/1160	12.8 km (8.0 mi)	257.8 km (160.2 mi)	Jagodina (interchange) – Ćuprija
0020/1159	10.7 km (6.6 mi)	268.5 km (166.8 mi)	Ćuprija – Paraćin
0021/1158	12.1 km (7.5 mi)	280.6 km (174.4 mi)	Paraćin – Pojate (overlap with)
0022/1157	14.7 km (9.1 mi)	295.3 km (183.5 mi)	Pojate – Ražanj
0023/1156	18.0 km (11.2 mi)	313.3 km (194.7 mi)	Ražanj – Aleksinački Rudnik
0024/1155	3.7 km (2.3 mi)	317.0 km (197.0 mi)	Aleksinački Rudnik – Aleksinac
0025/1154	22.8 km (14.2 mi)	339.8 km (211.1 mi)	Aleksinac – Niš (Trupale)
0026/1153	3.4 km (2.1 mi)	343.2 km (213.3 mi)	Niš (Trupale) – Niš (North Boulevard)
0027/1152	1.7 km (1.1 mi)	344.9 km (214.3 mi)	Niš (North Boulevard) – Niš (Prokuplje)
1448/1449	3.9 km (2.4 mi)	348.8 km (216.7 mi)	Niš (Prokuplje) – Niš (Prokuplje 1)
0028/1151	10.6 km (6.6 mi)	359.4 km (223.3 mi)	Niš (Prokuplje 1) – Doljevac 1
0073/0074	5.9 km (3.7 mi)	365.3 km (227.0 mi)	Doljevac 1 – Brestovac
0075/0076	6.9 km (4.3 mi)	372.2 km (231.3 mi)	Brestovac – Pečenjevce
0077/0078	16.4 km (10.2 mi)	388.6 km (241.5 mi)	Pečenjevce – to Vlasotince
0079/0080	6.7 km (4.2 mi)	395.3 km (245.6 mi)	to Vlasotince – Mala Kopašnica
0081	4.0 km (2.5 mi)	399.3 km (248.1 mi)	Mala Kopašnica – Grdelica
0032	9.3 km (5.8 mi)	408.6 km (253.9 mi)	Grdelica – Predejane
0033	8.3 km (5.2 mi)	416.9 km (259.0 mi)	Predejane – Džep
0034	9.5 km (5.9 mi)	426.4 km (265.0 mi)	Džep – Vladičin Han
0035	5.8 km (3.6 mi)	432.2 km (268.6 mi)	Vladičin Han – Gramađa (Surdulica)
0036	14.5 km (9.0 mi)	446.7 km (277.6 mi)	Gramađa (Surdulica) – Vranje 1
0038	5.7 km (3.5 mi)	452.4 km (281.1 mi)	Vranje 1 – Vranje 2
1442	0.8 km (0.50 mi)	453.2 km (281.6 mi)	Vranje 2 – Vranje (south interchange)
1440	8.6 km (5.3 mi)	461.8 km (286.9 mi)	Vranje (south interchange) – Ristovac
0040	6.0 km (3.7 mi)	467.8 km (290.7 mi)	Ristovac – Bujanovac
0041	20.4 km (12.7 mi)	488.2 km (303.4 mi)	Bujanovac – to Preševo
0042	6.1 km (3.8 mi)	494.3 km (307.1 mi)	to Preševo – Serbia – North Macedonia border at Tabanovce

== See also ==
- Roads in Serbia
