= Motorways in Serbia =

System of numbered routes in Serbia

Motorways in Serbia are called auto-put (Serbian Cyrillic: ауто-пут), a name which simply means car-road. Roads that are motorways are categorized as state roads of IA category and are marked with one or two digit numbers. Motorways in Serbia are controlled-access, toll roads, which have three lanes in each direction (including hard shoulder). Signs are white-on-green and the normal speed limit is 130 km/h (81 mph) (since June 2018). They are maintained and operated by the national road operator company JP "Putevi Srbije" ("Roads of Serbia").

As of July 2026, there are 1,066 km (662 mi) of motorways in service (excluding Kosovo).

== List of motorways ==
As the Serbian word for motorway is "autoput", the "A1", "A2", "A3", "A4" and "A5" road designations are used since 2013. After a revision in October 2023, 4 new motorway signs have been added: "A6", "A7", "A8" and "A9".

Sign	Route (in use)			In service	Planned
Sign	From	Via	To	In service	Planned
A1 motorway (Serbia)	Border with Hungary (Horgoš border crossing)	Novi Sad - Belgrade - Niš - Vranje	border with North Macedonia (Preševo border crossing)	582.9 km (362.2 mi)	582.9 km (362.2 mi)
A2 motorway (Serbia)	Belgrade	Surčin - Obrenovac - Lajkovac - Ljig - Gornji Milanovac - Preljina - Čačak - Požega	Boljare	150.2 km (93.3 mi)	270 km (170 mi)
A3 motorway (Serbia)	Border with Croatia (Batrovci border crossing)	Sremska Mitrovica - Ruma	Belgrade	95.4 km (59.3 mi)	95.4 km (59.3 mi)
A4 motorway (Serbia)	Niš	Pirot - Dimitrovgrad	border with Bulgaria (Gradina border crossing)	105.4 km (65.5 mi)	105.4 km (65.5 mi)
A5 motorway (Serbia)	Pojate	Kruševac - Trstenik - Vrnjačka Banja - Kraljevo	Preljina	102.3 km (63.6 mi)	115.2 km (71.6 mi)
A6 motorway (Serbia)	Novi Sad	Zrenjanin	Belgrade	0 km (0 mi)	105 km (65 mi)
A7 motorway (Serbia)	Kuzmin	Bosut	Border with Bosnia and Herzegovina near Sremska Rača	0 km (0 mi)	18 km (11 mi)
A8 motorway (Serbia)	Ruma	Hrtkovci	Šabac	24.5 km (15.2 mi)	24.5 km (15.2 mi)
A9 motorway (Serbia)	Bubanj Potok	Pančevo	Border with Romania near Vatin	0 km (0 mi)	65 km (40 mi)
A10 motorway (Serbia)	Požega	Užice	Border with Bosnia and Herzegovina near Kotroman	0 km (0 mi)	61 km (38 mi)
A11 motorway (Serbia)	Pančevo	Borča	Batajnica	0 km (0 mi)	31km (19.2 mi)
A12 motorway (Serbia)	Niš	Merošina - Prokuplje - Kuršumlija	Merdare	5.5 km (3.4 mi)	77 km (48 mi)
Total				1,066.2 km (662.5 mi)	1,550.4 km (963.4 mi)

The road sign informing the motorists they are travelling on an autoput

=== A1 motorway ===
A1 runs from the Horgoš border crossing with Hungary near Subotica, passing Novi Sad, Belgrade (A3 and A2 junction), Pojate near Kruševac (A5 junction), Niš (A4 junction), Leskovac and Vranje and eventually ends at the Preševo border crossing with North Macedonia. This motorway is part of European route E75.

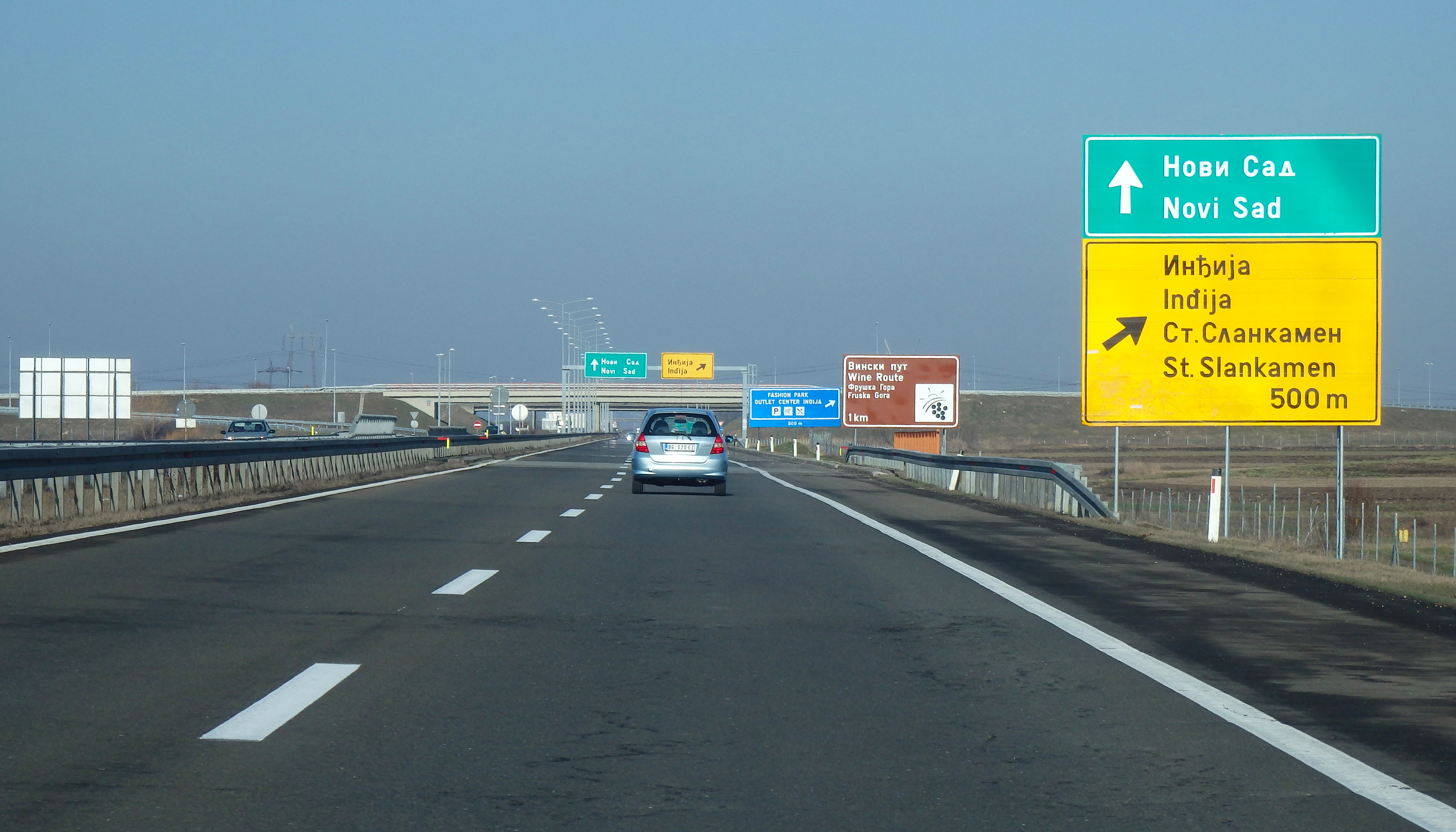
A1 motorway at Inđija interchange

=== A2 motorway ===
A2 is a motorway under construction that will link Belgrade with Bosnia and Herzegovina and Montenegro. The route passes Obrenovac, Čačak, Požega, Užice and ends at Kotroman (at the border with Bosnia and Herzegovina), and ends at Boljare (at the border with Montenegro).

As of 2025, the Pakovraće - Požega section has been completed, with Požega - Boljare section in planning.

=== A3 motorway ===
A3 runs from Batrovci border crossing with Croatia, passing Sremska Mitrovica and Ruma and ends at Dobanovci interchange near Belgrade.

=== A4 motorway ===
A4 is a motorway that connects the A1 motorway near Niš to Gradina border crossing with Bulgaria, part of European route E80.

=== A5 motorway ===
A5 is a motorway under construction that will link A1 with A2. The route starts at Pojate interchange near Ćićevac, passes Kruševac and Kraljevo and ends at Preljina interchange near Čačak. Construction of this stretch started in December 2019.

=== A8 motorway ===
A8 is a motorway that links the A3 motorway with Šabac-Loznica expressway. The route starts at the interchange near Ruma, passes Hrtkovci and ends near Šabac.

=== Motorway under construction ===
Designation	Section	Length	Completion
A5 motorway (Serbia)	Vrba - Adrani	12.9 km (8.0 mi)	November 2026
A6 motorway (Serbia)	Ovča - Zrenjanin	105 km (65 mi)	N/A
A7 motorway (Serbia)	Kuzmin (A3 interchange) - Sremska Rača border crossing	18 km (11 mi)	December 2026
Total		135.9 km (84.4 mi)	

=== Planned motorways ===
Designation	Route	Planned length
A2 motorway (Serbia)	Požega - Boljare (border with Montenegro)	107 km (66 mi)
A6 motorway (Serbia)	Belgrade - Zrenjanin - Novi Sad (A1 interchange)	113 km (70 mi)
A9 motorway (Serbia)	Belgrade (A1 interchange) - Vršac - Vatin (border with Romania)	
A10 motorway (Serbia)	Kotroman (border with Bosnia and Herzegovina - Užice - Požega (A2 interchange)	
A11 motorway (Serbia)	Batajnica (A1 interchange) - Pančevo (A9 interchange)	
A12 motorway (Serbia)	Merdare - Prokuplje - Niš (A1 interchange)	
Total		490 km (300 mi)

== Network expansion ==
Over 300 kilometers of new motorways have been constructed in the last decade and an additional 135.9 kilometres (84.4 mi) are currently under construction including: a 12.9 km (8.0 mi) long segment of A5 (from Pojate to Preljina); an 18 km (11 mi) section between Kuzmin and Sremska Rača.

== See also ==
- Transport in Serbia
- List of controlled-access highway systems
- Evolution of motorway construction in European nations
