= A5 motorway (Serbia) =

Road in Serbia

Autoput A 5
- Serbian: Autoput A5; Serbian Cyrillic: Аутопут А5

Route information
- Part of E761
- Length: 102.355 km (63.600 mi) 12.898 km (8 mi) under construction

Major junctions
- From: A1 / E75 at Pojate
- 38 at Kruševac: 260 at Trstenik; 24 at Kraljevo; 179 at Čačak
- To: A2 / E763 at Preljina

Location
- Country: Serbia
- Major cities: Kruševac, Kraljevo, Čačak

Highway system
- Roads in Serbia; Motorways
← A4	→ A1

The A5 motorway (Serbian: Аутопут А5, Autoput A5), called the Morava Corridor (Моравски коридор, Moravski koridor) is a motorway in Serbia under construction and when finished it will span for 113 kilometers (70 mi). It begins in Pojate, north of Kruševac, at the junction with A1 motorway and runs westward to Preljina near Čačak, where it intersects with the A2 motorway. There is currently a gap between Adrani and Vrba which is expected to be finished in December 2026. The construction started in December 2019 with the main contractor Bechtel.

== Route ==
The highway will mostly go through The West Morava Valley, and next to Šumadija District and Pomoravlje District on the northern side, and will connect directly the Rasina District, Raška District and Moravica District /, with combined population of about 760,000 inhabitants. There will be no tunnels, but some 78 bridges are planned on the route.

== List of exits ==
Nr	km	Name	Route	Places	Note
-	0	Pojate	A1 / E75	Belgrade, Novi Sad, Subotica, Sremska Mitrovica, Kragujevac, Niš	
1	3	Ćićevac	190	Ćićevac, Varvarin	
2	20	Kruševac East	38	Kruševac	
3	21	Kruševac West	183	Kruševac	
4	28	Koševi	260	Aleksandrovac	
5	36	Velika Drenova	187	Rekovac	
6	47	Trstenik	260	Trstenik	
7	58	Vrnjačka Banja	260	Vrnjačka Banja	
8	69	Vrba	260	Kraljevo	
9	75	Kamidžora	24	Kraljevo	This exit is planned to be constructed
10	82	Adrani	22	Kraljevo, Mataruška Banja, Novi Pazar	
11	97	Katrga	22; 46; 24	Knić, Kragujevac, A1 / E75	This exit is planned to be constructed in the future.
12	108	Preljina South	179	Čačak	
13	109	Preljina	A2 / E763	Belgrade, Valjevo, Požega, Užice, Sarajevo (Bosnia and Herzegovina), Podgorica (Montenegro)	
