= Belgrade bypass =

Road in Serbia

Belgrade bypass
- Serbian: Autoput A1; Serbian Cyrillic: Аутопут А1
- Milutin Mrkonjić Motorway

Route information
- Part of A1 / E75
- Maintained by JP "Putevi Srbije"
- Length: 47.44 km (29.48 mi) 79 km (49 mi) planned in total

Major junctions
- From: 100 at Batajnica
- A3 / E70 M11 at Dobanovci: A2 / E763 at Surčin South; 26 at Ostružnica; 22 at Orlovača
- To: M11 at Bubanj Potok

Location
- Country: Serbia
- Major cities: Belgrade

Highway system
- Roads in Serbia; Motorways

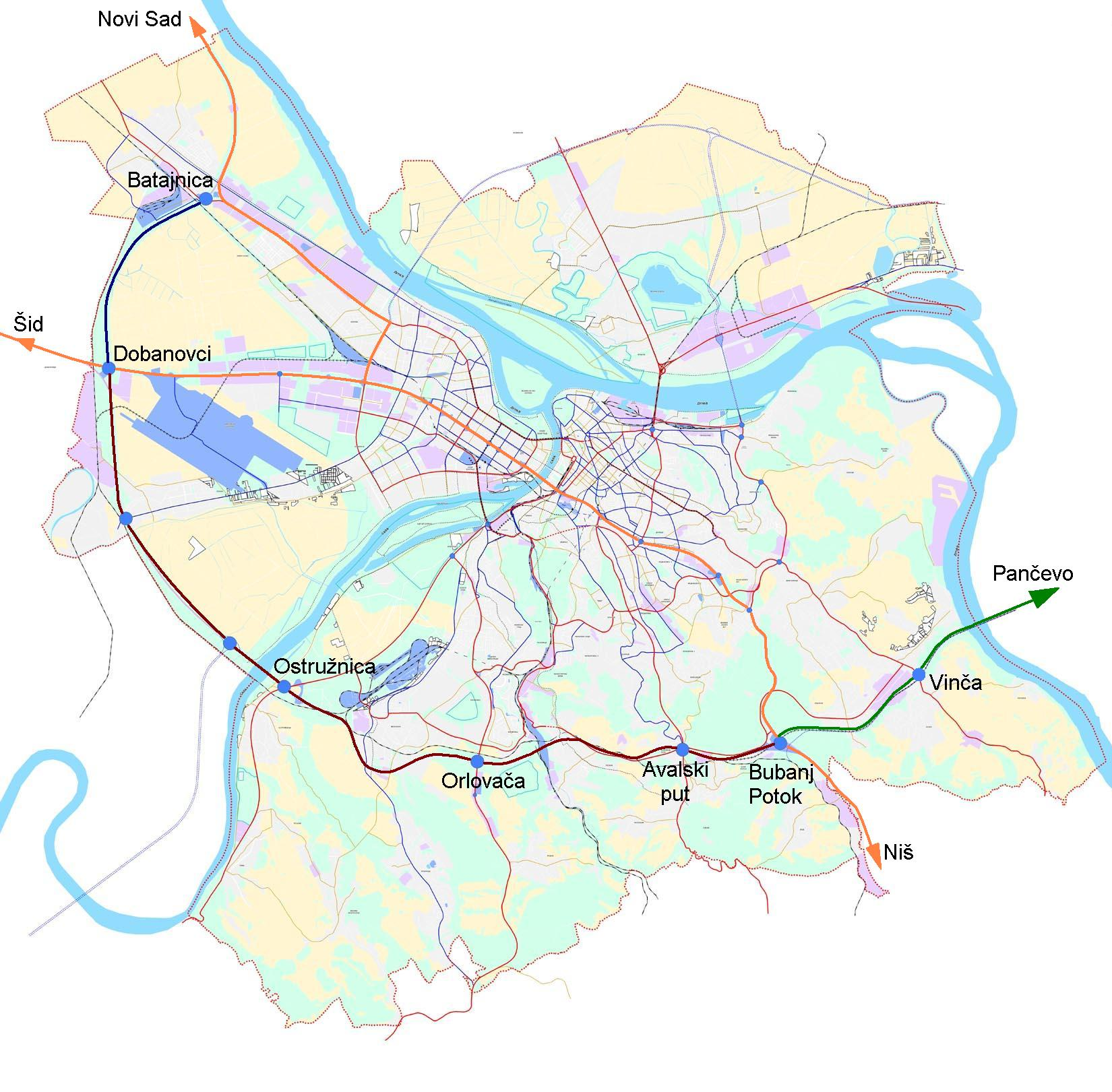
Sector A (Batajnica-Dobanovci) Sector B (Dobanovci-Bubanj Potok) Sector C (Bubanj Potok-Pančevo)

The Belgrade bypass (Serbian: Обилазница око Београда, Obilaznica oko Beograda), officially named the Milutin Mrkonjić Motorway (Аутопут Милутин Мркоњић, Autoput Milutin Mrkonjić), is a U-shaped, 47.44 km long motorway that partially encircles the city of Belgrade, the capital of Serbia. It is a part of the A1 motorway.

The construction of the bypass started in 1991 and its parts have been sporadically built ever since. Its completion is expected to help alleviate Belgrade's traffic congestion, and remove all transit traffic from the city itself. As of June 2023, two (out of three) sectors are fully completed.

== Name ==
The Belgrade bypass, sometimes is also mentioned as the Belgrade city road bypass. Since 14 July 2026, it is officially named the Milutin Mrkonjić Motorway, bearing the name of the late Serbian politician Milutin Mrkonjić.

== Route ==
Sector A (Batajnica - Dobanovci, A3 interchange)

Sector A is 10.1 km long part of A1 motorway that intersects with A3 motorway at Dobanovci interchange. It is completed and opened to traffic in 2012.

Sector B (Dobanovci, A3 interchange – Bubanj Potok)

Sector B is 37.2 km long part of A1 motorway that intersects with A2 motorway at Surčin interchange. It spans the hilly terrain to the south of Belgrade and it has 4 tunnels and 40 viaducts nine of them over 400 m long, with dual carriageway Ostružnica bridge across the Sava.

It is divided in 6 sections:

Section B1: Dobanovci interchange – Surčin. It includes Surčin interchange and the Surčin South interchange with the A2 highway. The right carriageway of this 7.8 km long sector was opened in 2005, while the left was opened in 2016.

Section B2: Surčin – Ostružnica Bridge. The right carriageway of this 4.9 km long section was opened in 2005, while the left was opened in 2016.

Section B3: Ostružnica Bridge – Ostružnica. This 4.1 km long section includes 1950 meters long Ostružnica Bridge over the Sava river and Ostružnica interchange with road 26 for Belgrade center and Obrenovac. The right carriageway was opened in 2005, while the left one was opened in June 2020.

Section B4: Ostružnica – Orlovača. On this 7.7 kilometer stretch are tunnels Lipak (665 m) and Železnik (699 m), as well as Orlovača interchange with road 22 for Belgrade center and Čačak. Only the right carriageway was constructed in 2008, while the left one was opened in April 2021.

Section B5: Orlovača – tunnel Straževica. It includes tunnel "Straževica", the longest one on Sector B (772 m). Only 3.1 km of the right carriageway was constructed in 2012. The left one was opened on June 15, 2022.

Section B6: Tunel "Straževica" – Bubanj Potok. It includes tunnel "Beli Potok" (360 m) and the Avala interchange. Along with the section B, it ends at the existing interchange Bubanj Potok, with the connecting roads being built. It opened on 28 June 2023.

Section	Length	Status (as of June 2023)
B1 (Dobanovci – Surčin)	7.8 km	In service (since 2016)
B2 (Surčin – Ostružnica Bridge)	4.9 km	In service (since 2016)
B3 (Ostružnica Bridge – Ostružnica)	4.1 km	In service (since 2020)
B4 (Ostružnica – Orlovača)	7.7 km	In service (since 2021)
B5 (Orlovača – tunnel "Straževica")	3.1 km	In service (since 2022)
B6 (Tunnel "Straževica" – Bubanj Potok)	9.74 km	In service (since 2023)

Sector C (Bubanj Potok - Pančevo)

Sector C is planned 31-km long eastern section of A9 motorway (which itself will connect Belgrade with Pančevo and Vršac and eventually Romania at border crossing near Vatin). This is the most complex sector of the bypass, as its construction involves building a 1,190-metre-long (3,900 ft) bridge over the Danube, and additional 11 viaducts and 2 tunnels. Its exact route is not decided yet, nor the start of the construction.
