= A3 motorway (Serbia) =

Road in Serbia

Autoput A 3
- Serbian: Autoput A3; Serbian Cyrillic: Аутопут А3

Route information
- Part of E70
- Maintained by JP "Putevi Srbije"
- Length: 95.444 km (59.306 mi)

Major junctions
- From: A3 E70 at Batrovci border with Croatia
- 21 A8 at Ruma
- To: A1 E75 (Belgrade bypass) at Dobanovci interchange

Location
- Country: Serbia
- Major cities: Sremska Mitrovica, Ruma, Belgrade

Highway system
- Roads in Serbia; Motorways
← A2	→ A4

The A3 motorway (Serbian: Аутопут А3, romanized: Autoput A3) is a motorway in Serbia which spans 95 kilometers (59 mi) and is part of the European route E70 through Serbia. It crosses the Syrmia region from east to west, starting at Belgrade and ending at the border crossing with Croatia.

== Route ==
The A3 motorway begins near Šid, at the Batrovci border crossing with Croatia, and runs westward across the Syrmia region, near Sremska Mitrovica and Ruma. It ends in the Dobanovci interchange near the outskirts of Belgrade where it meets the A1.

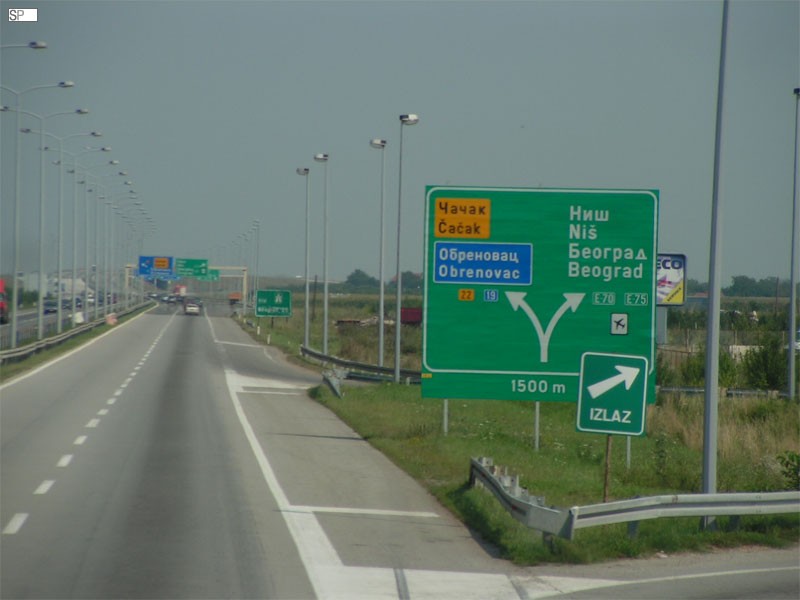
A3 near Dobanovci interchange

The main toll stations of the A3 are located at Batrovci near Šid and Šimanovci near Dobanovci. The Belgrade city motorway section between Šimanovci and Bubanj Potok interchanges is toll-free, serving as one of the main city arteries. It includes the exit to Nikola Tesla Airport, located just south of the A3.

== History ==
The A3 motorway is part of the old Belgrade-Zagreb motorway, known as Brotherhood and Unity Highway which was built after World War II, by young volunteers, and opened to traffic in 1950, first as a single carriageway. The second carriageway from Belgrade to Sremska Mitrovica was completed in 1977, while the section from Sremska Mitrovica to Šid was opened to traffic in 1987.

== List of exits ==
Nr	km	Name	Route	Places	Note
1	2	Batrovci		Batrovci	Accessible to eastbound traffic only.
2	8	Adaševci	121	Adaševci, Šid	
-	20	Kuzmin West	A7	Bijeljina (Bosnia and Herzegovina), Brčko (Bosnia and Herzegovina)	This exit is planned to be constructed.
3	22	Kuzmin	19; 120	Kuzmin, Bijeljina (Bosnia and Herzegovina)	
4	44	Sremska Mitrovica	120; 20	Sremska Mitrovica	
5	58	Ruma	A8 21	Ruma, Šabac	
6	69	Pećinci	120	Pećinci	
7	84	Šimanovci	318	Šimanovci	
8	92	Dobanovci	319	Dobanovci, Ugrinovci, Batajnica	
9	94	Dobanovci / Beograd	A1 / E75	Belgrade, Novi Sad, Čačak, Niš	

== See also ==
- Transport in Serbia
- National Road (M)1
