= A1 motorway (Serbia) =

Road in Serbia

A1 motorway
- Serbian: Autoput A1; Serbian Cyrillic: Аутопут А1

Route information
- Part of E75
- Maintained by JP "Putevi Srbije"
- Length: 582.935 km (362.219 mi)

Major junctions
- From: M5 E75 at Horgoš border crossing (Hungary)
- 11 at Subotica 12 at Novi Sad; A3 E70 at Dobanovci; A2 E763 at Surčin jug M7 at Požarevac; M15 at Batočina; A5 E761 at Pojate; A4 E80 at Trupale 39 at Leskovac
- To: A-1 E75 at Preševo border crossing (North Macedonia)

Location
- Country: Serbia
- Major cities: Subotica, Novi Sad, Belgrade, Smederevo, Jagodina, Niš, Leskovac, Vranje

Highway system
- Roads in Serbia; Motorways
← A5	→ A2

The A1 motorway (Serbian: Аутопут А1, romanized: Autoput A1) is a motorway in Serbia and at 583 kilometres (362 mi) it is the longest motorway in Serbia. It crosses the country from north to south, starting at the Horgoš border crossing with Hungary and ending at the Preševo border crossing with North Macedonia. As a part of the European route E75 and Pan-European corridor X, connecting 4 of 5 largest Serbian cities (Belgrade, Novi Sad, Niš and Subotica), it is the most vital part of the Serbian road network.

== Route ==
=== Northern section ===
The northern section (Hungarian border – Subotica – Novi Sad – Belgrade) is 172 km long and was built between 1971 and 2013.

The first subsection of this section to be opened is the Belgrade (Batajnica) – Novi Sad stretch. It was built between 1971 and 1975, but only a single carriageway was constructed at the time. It is 56.3 km long, and it includes the Beška Bridge (2,205 m) on the Danube river, which is the longest bridge on the Serbian road network. The next to open was the section between Novi Sad and Feketić, in 1986, 44.7 km long. Again, only one carriageway was constructed. Due to the breakup of Yugoslavia and the UN sanctions, motorway construction temporarily came to a halt. The next section to open was Feketić – Horgoš (border with Hungary), 71 km long. It was opened in 1997, and once again only the one (right) carriageway was constructed. After the right carriageway of the highway was complete, the construction of the left carriageway could start. The left carriageway between Batajnica and Beška was completed in 2004, and at this stage there was 32.2 km of a full-profile motorway. Construction continued, and the 19.1 km section from Beška to Novi Sad was completed in 2006. The next two sections were Novi Sad – Sirig and Žednik – Bikovo, both of them 10 km long; they opened in 2009. The first 5.5 km of the Novi Sad bypass were completed in 2010. In 2011 most of the motorway was upgraded to full-profile, with the completion of the 93 km sections Bikovo – Horgoš (border with Hungary), Sirig – Žednik and the twin Beška bridge. Finally, the remaining 2.5 km of the Novi Sad bypass were completed, which marked the end of construction of the northern section of the A1 motorway.

The motorway enters Serbia in Bačka and passes by Subotica, Bačka Topola, Vrbas, Novi Sad, crosses the Danube and enters Srem, passes by Inđija and Stara Pazova and arrives to Batajnica, a suburb of Belgrade, where the Belgrade bypass begins. This part of the A1 motorway passes through Vojvodina, which is part of the Pannonian Basin. This is very flat terrain and the motorway is surrounded by fields. In the Novi Sad area, the motorway features local-express lanes, in order to avoid congestion in both directions.

=== Belgrade bypass ===
Part of A1 motorway is Belgrade bypass, from Batajnica to Bubanj Potok, and it is 47.44 km long. Part from Batajnica to tunnel "Straževica" is completed and it is a full-profile motorway. Part from tunnel "Straževica" to Bubanj Potok interchange (sector 6) is 9.74 km long. It was opened to traffic in June 2023.

=== Central section ===
Central section (Belgrade–Niš) is 210 km-long and is completed in 1985.

The first section of this part of A1 motorway was opened in 1977, and it was 28.1 km long section Beograd (Bubanj Potok) – Umčari, which was opened with another 12.5 kilometres of motorway through Belgrade from Mostar interchange to Bubanj Potok. Next year, 79.3 kilometres from Umčari to Batočina were opened. Motorway was simultaneously constructed from Belgrade and from Niš, so in 1980 21.2 kilometres between Pojate and Deligrad were opened. In 1982 sections Batočina – Ćuprija and Deligrad – Niš were opened, and there was in total 189 kilometers between Belgrade and Niš. The last section was opened in 1985, and it was last 21 km between Ćuprija and Pojate.

The motorway goes through hilly terrain southern of Belgrade and then, near Smederevo enters the valley of Great Morava and later South Morava, passes by Jagodina, Ćuprija, Paraćin and Aleksinac and enters a basin near of Niš. Few km southwards Trupale interchange with A4 motorway which goes north of Niš, then passes Pirot, and goes to border with Bulgaria, while A1 motorway goes south by Južna Morava river.

=== Southern section ===
Southern section (Niš–Leskovac–Vranje–North Macedonia border) is 154 km long. Construction of southern section started in 1992 and has only been completed and opened for traffic in 2019. First section of this part of A1 motorway was opened in 1992, and it was 13 km long section Niš – Batušinac. In 1997 year 23 kilometres from Batušinci to Pečenjevce were opened. Motorway construction continued in 2003 with the 23 km long subsection between Pečenjevce and Grabovnica which was completed in 2005. The next subsection to be opened to traffic was 21 km-long Levosoje – border with North Macedonia in 2013. New momentum came in 2014 when construction started on last remaining subsections (5.6 km-long Grabovnica – Grdelica, 26.1 km-long Grdelica – Vladičin Han, 26.3 km-long Vladičin Han – Donji Neradovac, 8 km-long Donji Neradovac – Srpska Kuća, and 8 km-long Srpska Kuća – Levosoje) and was in simultaneous construction from until 2019 when it was completed and this last remaining part of A1 motorway was opened to traffic.

Motorway passes through valley of South Morava, passes west of Niš, by Merošina and Leskovac, and through very difficult terrain of Grdelica Gorge. On this part of motorway through the Grdelica Gorge there are 33 bridges, of which Vrla bridge is the longest (around 650 meters long and around 60 high), and two tunnels: "Predejane" (1,000 m) and "Manajle" (1,818 m) which is the secondlongest tunnel in Serbia. Near Vladičin Han motorway leaves Grdelica gorge and passes by Vranje. Few kilometres south of Preševo motorway ends at Preševo border crossing with North Macedonia.

== List of exits ==
Nr	km	Name	Route	Places	Note
1	4	Horgoš	13	Horgoš, Kanjiža, Novi Kneževac	
2	17	Subotica north	100	Palić, Subotica	
3	23	Subotica east	300	Subotica	
4	27	Subotica south	11	Subotica, Kelebija, Hungary	
5	38	Čantavir	303	Čantavir, Novi Žednik, Tornjoš	This is the first exit on the tolled part of A1 highway.
6	50	Bačka Topola	105	Bačka Topola, Senta	
7	60	Mali Iđoš		Mali Iđoš	Construction of this exit is planned.
8	71	Feketić	100	Feketić, Mali Iđoš	
9	81	Vrbas	15	Vrbas, Srbobran, Kula	
10	94	Sirig	112	Sirig, Zmajevo, Temerin	
11	110	Novi Sad north		Novi Sad	
12	112	Novi Sad center	100; 102	Novi Sad, Temerin, Bački Jarak	
13	114	Novi Sad east	12	Novi Sad, Žabalj, Zrenjanin	
14	119	Novi Sad south	21	Irig, Ruma, Šabac, Loznica, Bijeljina (Bosnia and Herzegovina)	Road 21 is a single carriageway road and does not have an exit on A1, but it is planned to be upgraded to a motorway with an interchange with A1.
15	130	Kovilj	114	Kovilj, Šajkaš, Titel	
16	143	Beška		Beška, Krčedin, Sremski Karlovci	
17	147	Maradik	125	Inđija, Sremski Karlovci	From this exit it is only possible to enter the motorway towards Belgrade and exit the motorway from Belgrade.
18	152	Inđija	126	Inđija, Ruma	This is the last exit on the tolled part of the A1 highway.
19	162	Stara Pazova	127	Stara Pazova, Stari Banovci,	
20	165	Nova Pazova		Nova Pazova, Stari Banovci	
21	169	Novi Banovci	319	Novi Banovci, Batajnica	
22	175	Batajnica	100	Batajnica, Zemun, New Belgrade, Borča	It is not possible to access Batajnica directly from this exit until the construction of Batajnica boulevard is completed.
23	183	Dobanovci	A3 / E70; M11	Zagreb (Croatia), Bijeljina (Bosnia and Herzegovina), Šid, Sremska Mitrovica, Šabac, Loznica	
24	187	Surčin	319	Surčin, Dobanovci, Jakovo, Novi Beograd	
24.1	191	Surčin south	A2 / E763; 475	New Belgrade, Obrenovac, Valjevo, Čačak	
25	197	Ostružnica	26	Ostružnica, Obrenovac, Čukarica	
26	206	Orlovača	22	Čukarica, Lazarevac, Barajevo	
27	212	Avala	154	Beli Potok, Voždovac, Sopot	
28	217	Bubanj Potok	M11	Belgrade, Pančevo, Vršac	This interchange is partially open.
29	219	Tranšped		Zuce	
30	224	Vrčin	347	Vrčin, Grocka	
31	238	Mali Požarevac	25	Sopot, Mladenovac	This is the first exit on the tolled part of A1.
32	245	Umčari	351	Umčari, Grocka	
33	251	Vodanj	155	Vodanj, Smederevo, Mladenovac	
34	257	Kolari	352	Kolari, Smederevo, Smederevska Palanka	
35	263	Smederevo	153; 14	Smederevo, Kovin, Pančevo	
36	264	Požarevac	M7	Požarevac, Kostolac, Veliko Gradište, Majdanpek	
37	293	Velika Plana	147; 158	Velika Plana, Smederevska Palanka, Mladenovac, Petrovac na Mlavi	
38	305	Markovac	27	Markovac, Svilajnac, Rača, Topola	
39	311	Lapovo		Lapovo	
40	315	Batočina	M15	Batočina, Kragujevac, Kraljevo	
41	337	Jagodina	184	Jagodina	
42	349	Ćuprija	160	Ćuprija, Resavica, Despotovac	
43	360	Paraćin	36	Paraćin, Boljevac, Zaječar	
44	372	Pojate	A5 / E761	Kruševac, Trstenik, Vrnjačka Banja, Kraljevo, Čačak	
45	385	Ražanj	158	Ražanj	
46	405	Aleksinački Rudnici	158	Aleksinački Rudnik, Aleksinac	
47	410	Aleksinac	158; 217	Aleksinac, Sokobanja	
48	432	Trupale	A4 / E80	Niš, Niška Banja, Pirot, Dimitrovgrad, Sofia (Bulgaria)	
49	435	Niš south	158	Niš	
50	441	Merošina	35	Merošina, Prokuplje, Kuršumlija, Brus, Priština	It is planned for this exit to be upgraded to an interchange with the Niš – Priština motorway when it is constructed.
51	451	Doljevac	158; 216	Doljevac, Prokuplje	
52	457	Brestovac	225	Brestovac, Gadžin Han, Bojnik	
53	465	Leskovac center	258	Leskovac	
54	481	Leskovac south	39	Leskovac, Vlasotince, Pirot	
55	492	Grdelica	258	Grdelica	
56	502	Predejane	258	Predejane	
57	516	Vladičin Han	40	Vladičin Han, Surdulica	
58	539	Vranje	258	Vranje, Vranjska Banja	
59	553	Bujanovac north	258	Bujanovac	
60	556	Bujanovac south	258	Bujanovac, Ranilug, Gnjilane	This is the last exit on the tolled part of A1 motorway.
61	578	Preševo	40	Preševo, Gnjilane	

== Toll ==
The A1 is by and large a toll road, as are all motorways in Serbia. The toll is collected at entry and exit toll stations based on the distance travelled and the category of the vehicle. The toll sections are Subotica – Stara Pazova, Belgrade (Vrčin) – Preševo, while the Belgrade bypass section and short stretches immediately adjoining it are toll-free.

== Gallery ==
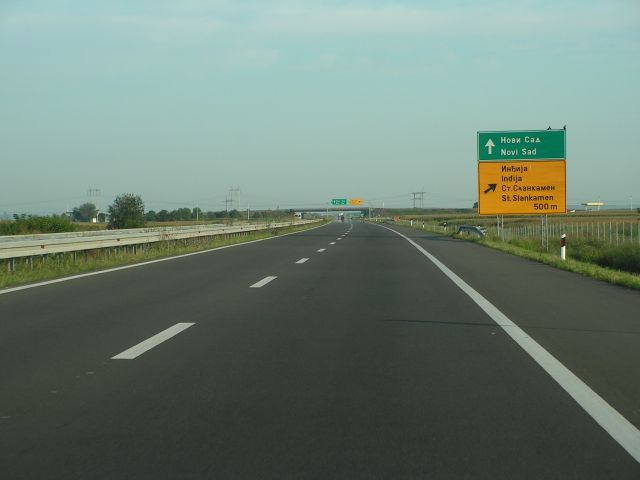
A1 near Inđija

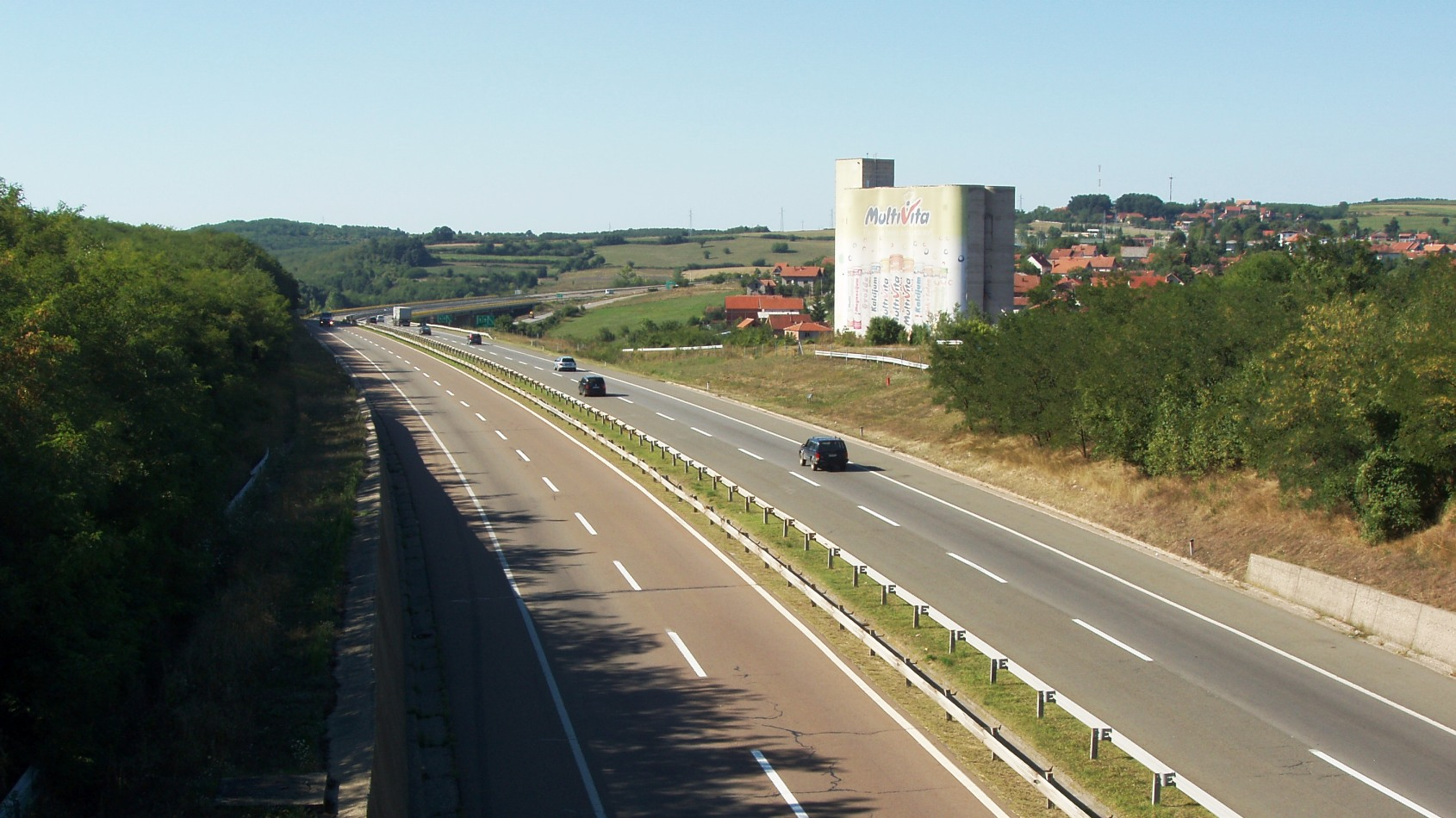
A1 near Ražanj

== See also ==
- National Road (M)1

== Sources ==
- Sić, Miroslav (June 1990). "Problematika razvoja autocesta u Hrvatskoj i Jugoslaviji na pragu 90. godina" [Development of Motorways in Croatia and Yugoslavia on the Threshold of the Nineties] (PDF). Geografski glasnik (in Serbo-Croatian). 52 (1): 13–29.
- Putevi Srbije P.E.
- Koridori Srbije P.E.
