= Dobanovci interchange =

- Serbian: Чвор Добановци; Čvor Dobanovci
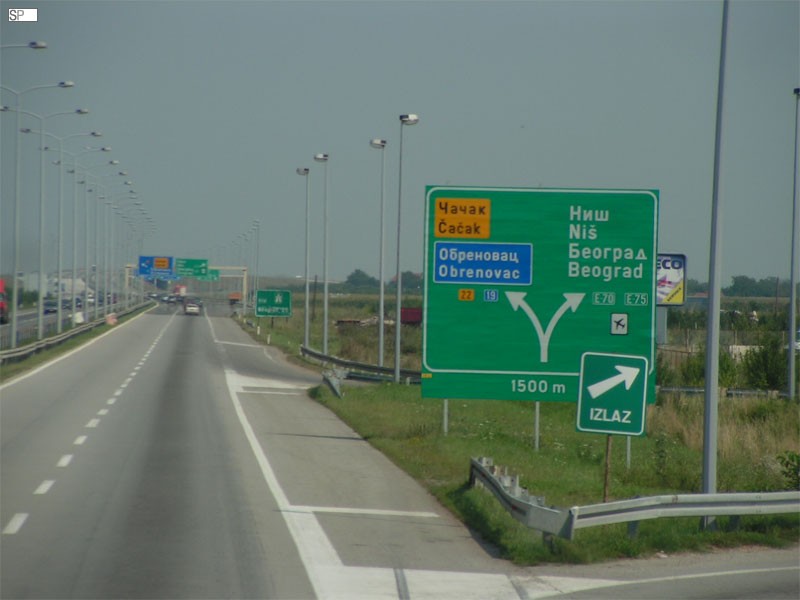
- Dobanovci interchange

Location
- Dobanovci (Belgrade), Serbia
- Coordinates: 44.50160°N 20.15041°E
- Roads at junction: A1; A3

Construction
- Type: Cloverleaf interchange

The Dobanovci interchange (Serbian: Чвор Добановци, romanized: Čvor Dobanovci) is a cloverleaf interchange west of Belgrade, Serbia. It is named after nearby Belgrade neighborhood of Dobanovci. The interchange represents the eastern terminus of the A3 motorway which connects to the A1 motorway, representing major a link in the Serbian motorway system. The interchange is a part of Pan-European corridors X and Xb. It also represents a junction of European routes E75 and E70. Construction of the interchange marked start of construction of the A1 motorway in its present form. In 2011, it became a part of the first six-lane (including emergency lanes) section, constructed as a part of the Belgrade-Horgoš motorway section connecting the Dobanovci and Batajnica interchanges. At the time of construction, the interchange connected the new Belgrade bypass to former Brotherhood and Unity Highway which linked Belgrade to Croatian border.
