= A4 motorway (Serbia) =

Road in Serbia

Autoput A 4
- Serbian: Autoput A4; Serbian Cyrillic: Аутопут А4

Route information
- Part of E80
- Maintained by JP "Putevi Srbije"
- Length: 105.434 km (65.514 mi)

Major junctions
- From: A1 E75 at Trupale
- Niš, Bela Palanka, Pirot, Dimitrovgrad
- To: E80 at Gradina border crossing (Bulgaria)

Location
- Country: Serbia
- Major cities: Niš, Bela Palanka, Pirot, Dimitrovgrad

Highway system
- Roads in Serbia; Motorways
← A3	→ A5

The A4 motorway (Serbian: Аутопут А4, romanized: Autoput A4) is a motorway in Serbia, and it spans for 105 kilometers (65 mi).

== History ==
The ancient Roman road Via Militaris connecting Balkans, central and Western Europe had a similar route to the modern-day A4 motorway. The old highway which is still in partial use was constructed during the 1960s and 1970s. Soon, there began to be, especially during summer, too many vehicles using the road which made it unsafe on some parts. So in the 1990s, the construction of a modern motorway started.

=== Beginning of construction ===
The first section of the motorway were 3 km from Trupale interchange to Komren on entrance in Niš which was constructed in the period 1990–1992. After 1992, due to the wars in Croatia and Bosnia and Herzegovina, as well as UN sanctions towards FR Yugoslavia, construction of motorways in Serbia stopped until the wars ended. Construction of the Komren — Prosek section, which is usually referred as Niš bypass, started in 1998, but was cancelled due to the war in Kosovo and NATO intervention. Construction of this section was completed in 2006. Soon after, project of completion of the motorway started.

=== Construction of rest of the motorway ===
The first two sections on which construction started in 2010 were Pirot east — Dimitrovgrad (14.3 km) and Dimitrovgrad bypass (8.6 km). Next year, construction started on Crvena Reka — Čiflik (12.7 km), while in 2012, construction of Prosek — Crvena Reka (22.5 km) commenced. Finally, in 2013, construction started on sections Čiflik — Staničenje (12.1 km) and Staničenje — Pirot east (16.6 km). The first completed section was Pirot east — Dimitrovgrad in 2016, but it could not be opened until two neighboring sections were completed. The next two completed sections were Crvena Reka — Čiflik and Čiflik—Staničenje which were opened in July 2017.

In July 2017, the section Prosek—Bancarevo (9.2 km) was also completed, but it was still not opened because Bancarevo — Crvena Reka section was not completed at the time.

In August 2017, the first carriageway of motorway was opened of 5.1 kilometers-long part of section Staničenje — Pirot east from end of bridge Nišava 4 to Sarlah tunnel.

In September of same year, for traffic were opened the last 7.2 km of section Staničenje — Pirot east (from exit of tunnel Sarlah to end of section), the section Pirot east — Dimitrovgrad and the first 6.8 km of the Dimitrovgrad bypass (from beginning of section to Gradinje cut). Also, 1.2 km of half-profile motorway were opened on Dimitrovgrad bypass.

In March 2018, full-profile motorway was completed on 5.1 km-long part of section Staničenje — Pirot east on which the first carriageway was opened in 2017. Also were opened another 0.6 km of full-profile motorway and 0.6 km of second carriageway on Dimitrovgrad bypass.

In June 2018, the last 0.6 km of the second carriageway on the Dimitrovgrad bypass was opened. In June, was also opened first carriageway on 2 km from bridge Nišava 2 to bridge Nišava 4 on section Staničenje — Pirot east, while the second carriageway on this part was opened in July 2018.

== Route ==
The motorway begins at Trupale interchange near Niš, at the junction with A1 motorway and runs eastward, to the Gradina border crossing with Bulgaria, near Dimitrovgrad. The motorway is part of the Pan-European corridor X and is planned to be connected with the Bulgarian Europe motorway that will run to Sofia.

== List of exits ==
Nr	km	Name	Route	Places
–	0	Trupale	A1 / E75	Kragujevac, Belgrade, Novi Sad, Sremska Mitrovica, Leskovac, Vranje, Priština
1	2	Niš north	158	Niš, Niš Constantine the Great Airport
2	9	Niš east	426	Niš, Niška Banja
3	17	Malča	35	Svrljig, Knjaževac, Zaječar
4	46	Bela Palanka	223	Bela Palanka
5	70	Pirot west	259	Pirot
6	80	Pirot east	259	Pirot
7	96	Dimitrovgrad	259	Dimitrovgrad
8	103	Gradina	259	Gradinje, Dimitrovgrad
