= National Road (M)1.9 (Serbia) =

Road in Serbia

National Road (M)1.9
- Serbian: Magistralni put (M)1.9; Serbian Cyrillic: Магистрални пут (М)1.9
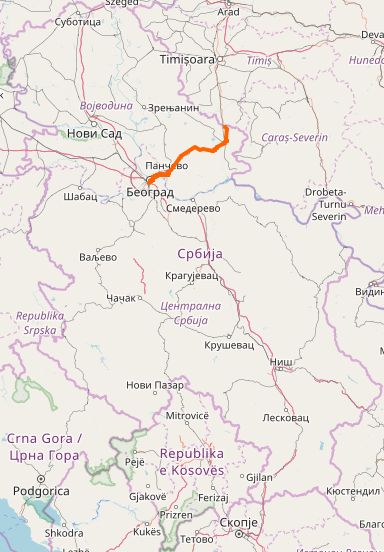

Route information
- Part of E70
- Maintained by JP "Putevi Srbije"
- Length: 104 km (65 mi)

Major junctions
- From: M1 / E70 / E75 at Belgrade
- To: DN59 / E70 at Serbia–Romania border at Vatin

Location
- Country: Serbia
- Districts: City of Belgrade, South Banat

Highway system
- Roads in Serbia; Motorways
← M1	→ M1.10

National Road 1.9 (alternatively marked as M-1.9, M1.9, M 1.9 and M1/9), was a road in Serbia, connecting Belgrade with Romania at Vatin. After the new road categorization regulation given in 2013, the route wears the name 10, except for the section passing through the capital city, which is currently not numbered. The route was a national road with two traffic lanes (more in city sections).

== Sections ==
Section number	Length	Distance	Section name
0043	10.4 km (6.5 mi)	10.4 km (6.5 mi)	Belgrade (Mostar interchange) – Belgrade (Krnjača)
0044/1450	7.4 km (4.6 mi)	17.8 km (11.1 mi)	Belgrade (Krnjača) – Sibnica
0046/1451	2.2 km (1.4 mi)	20.0 km (12.4 mi)	Sibnica – Vojvodina border (Pančevo)
2014/2015	5.7 km (3.5 mi)	25.7 km (16.0 mi)	Vojvodina border (Pančevo) – Pančevo 1 (Kovin)
2016/2017	1.3 km (0.81 mi)	27.0 km (16.8 mi)	Pančevo 1 (Kovin) – Pančevo 2 (Zrenjanin) (overlap with)
2018	31.8 km (19.8 mi)	58.8 km (36.5 mi)	Pančevo 2 (Zrenjanin) – to Alibunar
2019	5.2 km (3.2 mi)	64.0 km (39.8 mi)	to Alibunar – Banatski Karlovac
2306	0.7 km (0.43 mi)	64.7 km (40.2 mi)	Banatski Karlovac – Deliblato
2020	11.2 km (7.0 mi)	75.9 km (47.2 mi)	Deliblato – Uljma
2021	13.7 km (8.5 mi)	89.6 km (55.7 mi)	Uljma – Vršac 1 (Zrenjanin) (overlap with)
2022	1.0 km (0.62 mi)	90.6 km (56.3 mi)	Vršac 1 – Vršac 2 (to Straža)
2023	13.4 km (8.3 mi)	104.0 km (64.6 mi)	Vršac 2 (to Straža) – Serbia – Romania border at Vatin

== See also ==
- Roads in Serbia
