= A2 motorway (Serbia) =

Road in Serbia

Autoput A 2
- Serbian: Autoput A2; Serbian Cyrillic: Аутопут А2
- Miloš the Great Motorway

Route information
- Part of E761 E763
- Maintained by JP "Putevi Srbije"
- Length: 150.188 km (93.322 mi) 106.806 km (66 mi) planned

Major junctions
- From: A1 / E75 at Belgrade
- 26 at Obrenovac 27 at Lajkovac; 22 at Ljig; A5 at Preljina 23 at Požega
- To: A-1 / E-763 at the Boljare border crossing (Montenegro)

Location
- Country: Serbia
- Major cities: Belgrade, Obrenovac, Gornji Milanovac, Čačak, Požega,

Highway system
- Roads in Serbia; Motorways
← A1	→ A3

The A2 motorway (Serbian: Аутопут А2, Autoput A2), called the Miloš the Great Motorway (Serbian: Аутопут Милош Велики, Autoput Miloš Veliki) is a motorway in Serbia under construction. When complete, it will span 257 kilometers (160 mi). It begins in Belgrade and runs southward to Čačak and Požega, then going further south towards Montenegro ending at the future Boljare border crossing.

This motorway will provide a faster route to Montenegro by linking to the Bar-Boljare motorway, currently under construction. It is frequently referred in Serbian media as part of proposed Corridor XI (Serbian: Коридор 11, Koridor XI) - an envisioned ferry/motorway corridor linking Bari (Italy), Bar (Montenegro), Belgrade (Serbia) and Bucharest (Romania).

== Route ==
=== Section Belgrade—Požega ===
Subsection Surčin—Obrenovac

The northernmost subsection Surčin—Obrenovac starts on interchange “Surčin jug” with A1 motorway. It passes by Jakovo as it leaves the Syrmia region by passing Sava and Kolubara rivers on a 1766 meters-long bridge. The section ends close to the bridge on the “Obrenovac” interchange where next subsection, Obrenovac—Ub, starts. The construction of this 17.6 kilometer-long section started in 2017 and was completed by the end of 2019 with main contractor China Communications Construction Company (CCCC).

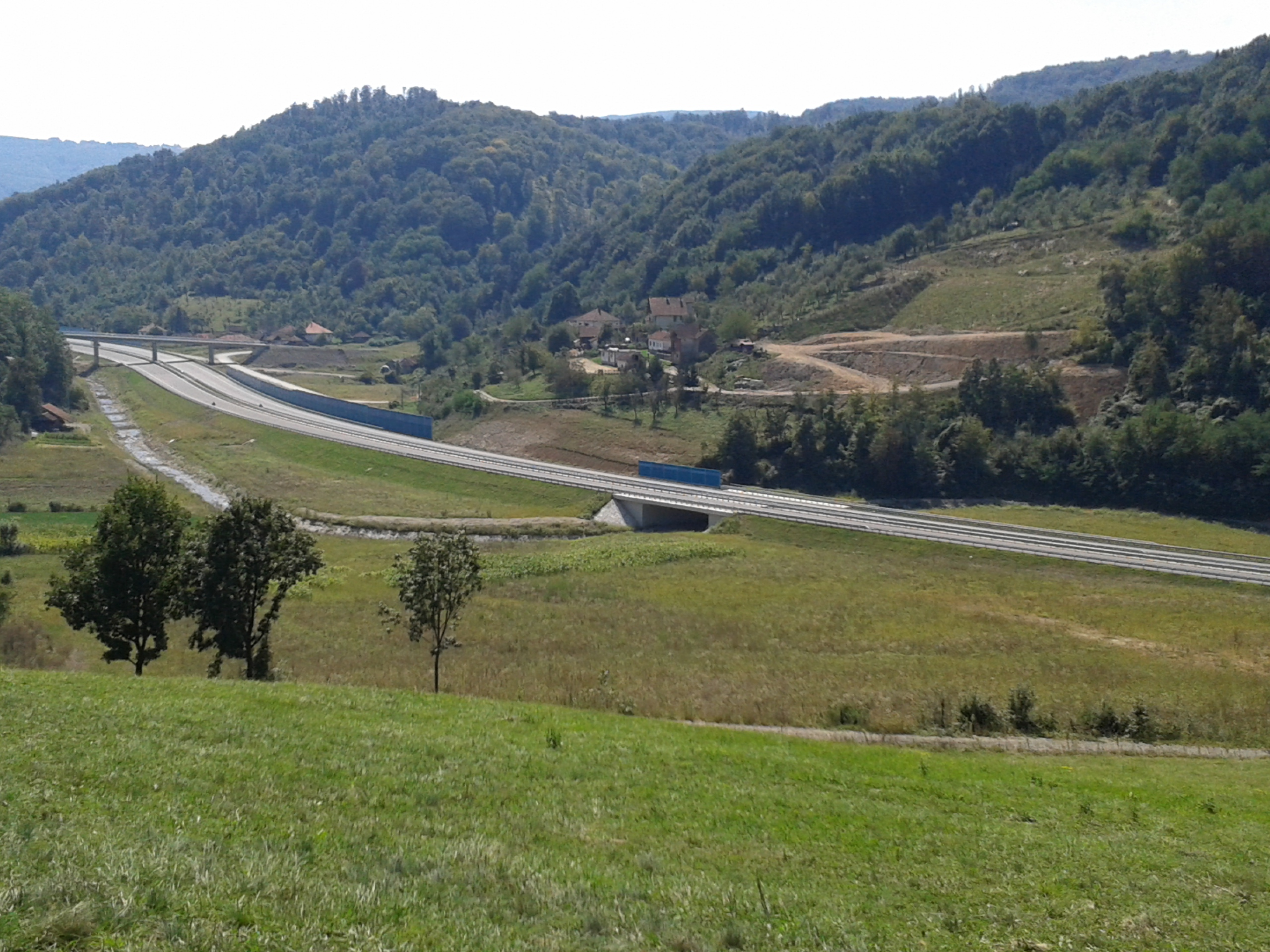
A2 motorway between Ljig and Preljina

Subsection Obrenovac—Ub

This 26.2 kilometers-long section was under construction from 2014 to 2019. The main contractor was Chinese company Shandong Hi-Speed Group. On this section there are 14 bridges, one rest area and exit 'Ub'. It goes through flat terrain in the Kolubara river valley.

Subsection Ub—Lajkovac

Section Ub—Lajkovac which is 12.5 kilometers-long is first completed section on A2 motorway. It was constructed from 2011 to 2014, and main contractors were Serbian companies 'Putevi Užice' and 'GP Planum'. Value of this section is 73 million euros and it was funded by the budget of the Government of Serbia. On this section there are 13 bridges, one rest area and exit „Lajkovac“. Even though it was completed in 2014, it could not be put into service while sections Obrenovac—Ub and Lajkovac—Ljig were under construction.

Subsection Lajkovac—Ljig

This 24 kilometers-long section was under construction from 2014 to 2019. Main contractor s Chinese company Shandong Hi-Speed Group. On this section there are 16 bridges, tunnel 'Brančići' (956m), one rest area and exit 'Ljig'. It goes through flat terrain in valley of Kolubara and Ljig rivers, and after Ljig it enters hilly terrain.

Subsection Ljig—Preljina

The 40.3 kilometers-long section Ljig—Preljina is first section of motorway A2 which was put into service. It was constructed from 2012 to 2016 by Azerbaijani company AzVirt. It starts near Dići which is few kilometers from Ljig, passes near Takovo where is exit 'Takovo' for Gornji Milanovac. This section ends on exit 'Preljina' near to Čačak, where there is an interchange with the A5 motorway. On this section there are 66 bridges and 12 overpasses, 4 tunnels: 'Veliki Kik' (200m), 'Savinac' (270m/260m), 'Šarani' (937m/1040m) and 'Brđani' (456m/438m) and 3 rest areas.

Subsection Preljina—Požega

Subsection Preljina—Požega was completed in 2025 (the Preljina-Pakovraće section being inaugurated in 2022). It is 30.9 kilometers long and divided on 3 tranches: Preljina—Prijevor, Prijevor—Lučani and Lučani—Požega. Commercial contract with Chinese company China Communications Construction Company (CCCC) worth 450 million euros was signed in 2017. There are 3 exits: 'Pakovraće' (near Čačak), 'Lučani' and 'Požega'. Also, one third of this subsection will be under bridges and 3 tunnels: 'Trbušani' (360m), 'Laz' (2562m) and 'Munjino Brdo' (2861m). The construction started in 2019, was expected to be completed by the end of 2023, but was finally completed and open to traffic in July 2025.

On interchange "Požega" near Prilipac motorway will be divided on two directions: to Boljare (border with Montenegro) and to Kotroman (border with Bosnia and Herzegovina). Motorway will pass through valleys of Čemernica and Zapadna Morava rivers, while from Prijevor it enters hilly terrain and bypasses Ovčar-Kablar Gorge.

=== Section Požega—Border with Montenegro ===
Požega — Boljare section represents the final segment of the A2 motorway in Serbia, connecting Požega with the Boljare border crossing on the border with Montenegro. The total length of the section is 106.3 km, divided into 11 subsections.

The motorway runs through the valley of the Moravica River, between the slopes of Javor and Golija, across the Pešter plateau, passing near Arilje, Ivanjica, and Sjenica (Duga Poljana), and ends at the future Boljare border crossing. The most demanding part of the route is between Požega and Duga Poljana, where 72 bridges with a total length of 35 km and 10 tunnels with a total length of 16.88 km are planned.

Five major interchanges are planned along the route:

- Požega (0 km),
- Arilje (≈ 18 km),
- Ivanjica (≈ 38 km),
- Duga Poljana (≈ 78 km), and
- Boljare (106.3 km).

The estimated cost of construction is around €1 billion. Works are expected to begin after the completion of the Preljina — Požega section. Due to the challenging terrain, this section is considered one of the most complex in Serbia, with a large number of bridges and tunnels.

== List of exits ==
Exit list is shown just for sections between Belgrade and Požega, because the detailed route for section Požega—Boljare is currently unknown.

Nr	km	Name	Route	Places	Note
24.1	0	Surčin jug	A1 / E75	Budapest (Hungary), Subotica, Novi Sad, Sremska Mitrovica, Zagreb (Croatia), Niš	
1/1	2	Jakovo		Jakovo, Boljevci, Bečmen, Pećinci	
1	16	Obrenovac	26	Obrenovac, Umka, Barič, Belgrade, Šabac	
2	42	Ub	146	Ub	This is the first exit on the tolled part of the A2 motorway.
3	55	Lajkovac	27	Lajkovac, Lazarevac, Valjevo	
4	75	Ljig	22	Ljig	
5	102	Takovo	177	Takovo, Gornji Milanovac	
6	119	Preljina	A5 / E761	Čačak, Kraljevo, Kruševac, Trstenik, Kragujevac, Vrnjačka Banja	
7	129	Pakovraće	23	Čačak	
8	142	Lučani	181	Lučani, Guča	
9	149	Prilipac	21 A10	Požega, Užice, Zlatibor, Nova Varoš, Prijepolje, Višegrad (Bosnia and Herzegovina), Sarajevo (Bosnia and Herzegovina)	This is the last exit on the tolled part of the A2 motorway.

=== Image gallery ===
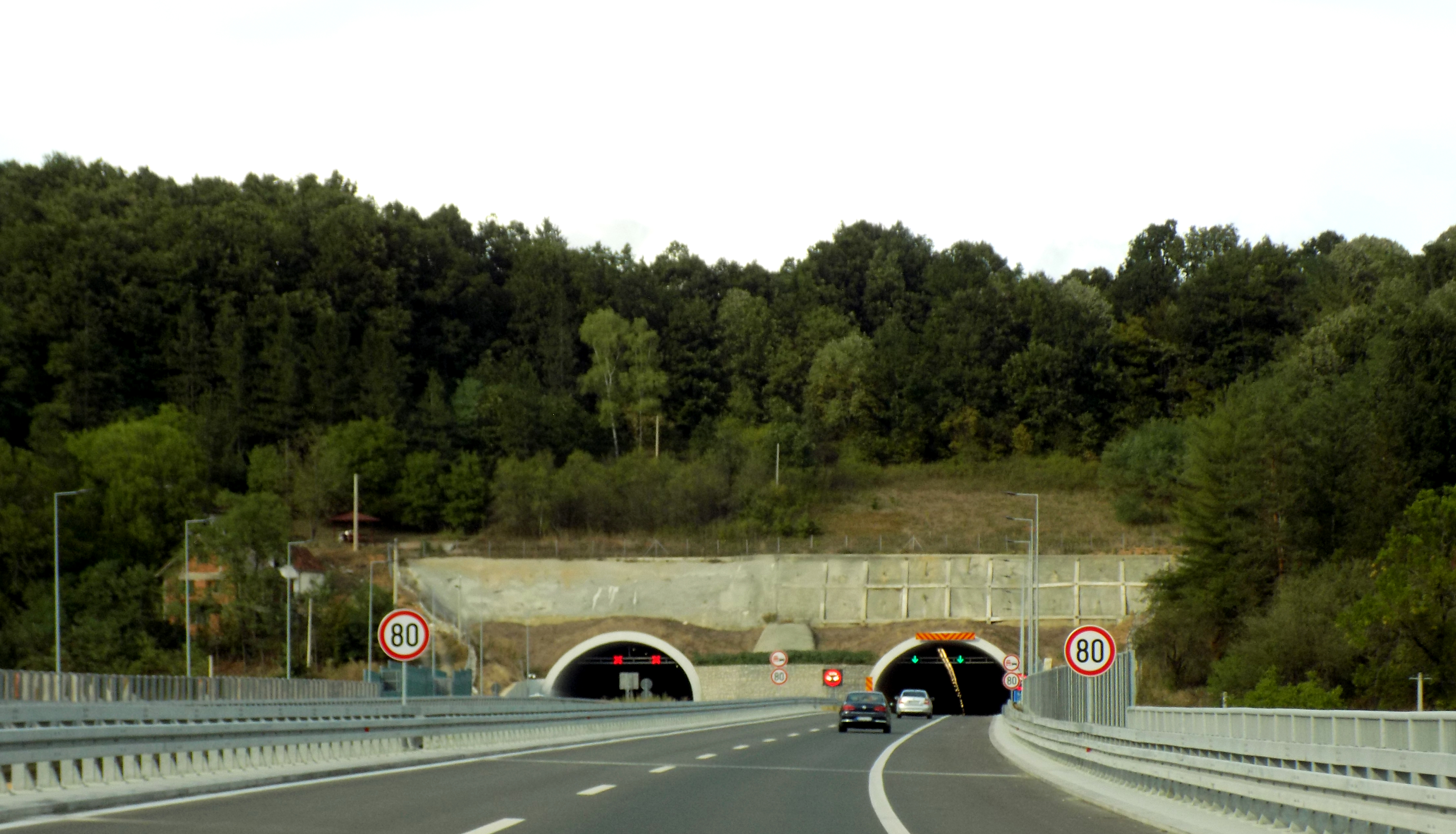
A2 motorway in Savinac

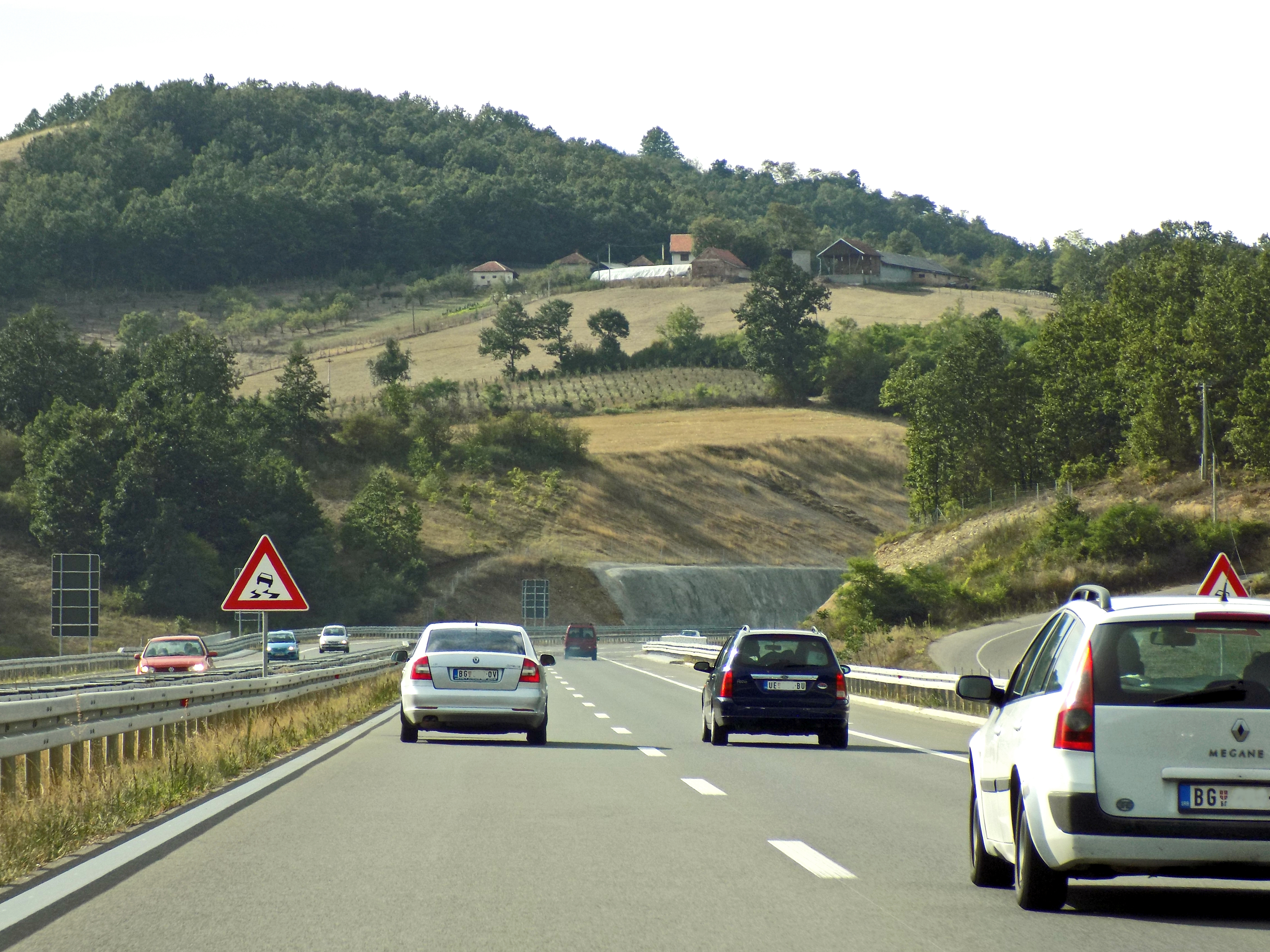
A2 motorway near Ljig
