= Šarani (Gornji Milanovac) =

Šarani Шарани
- Village
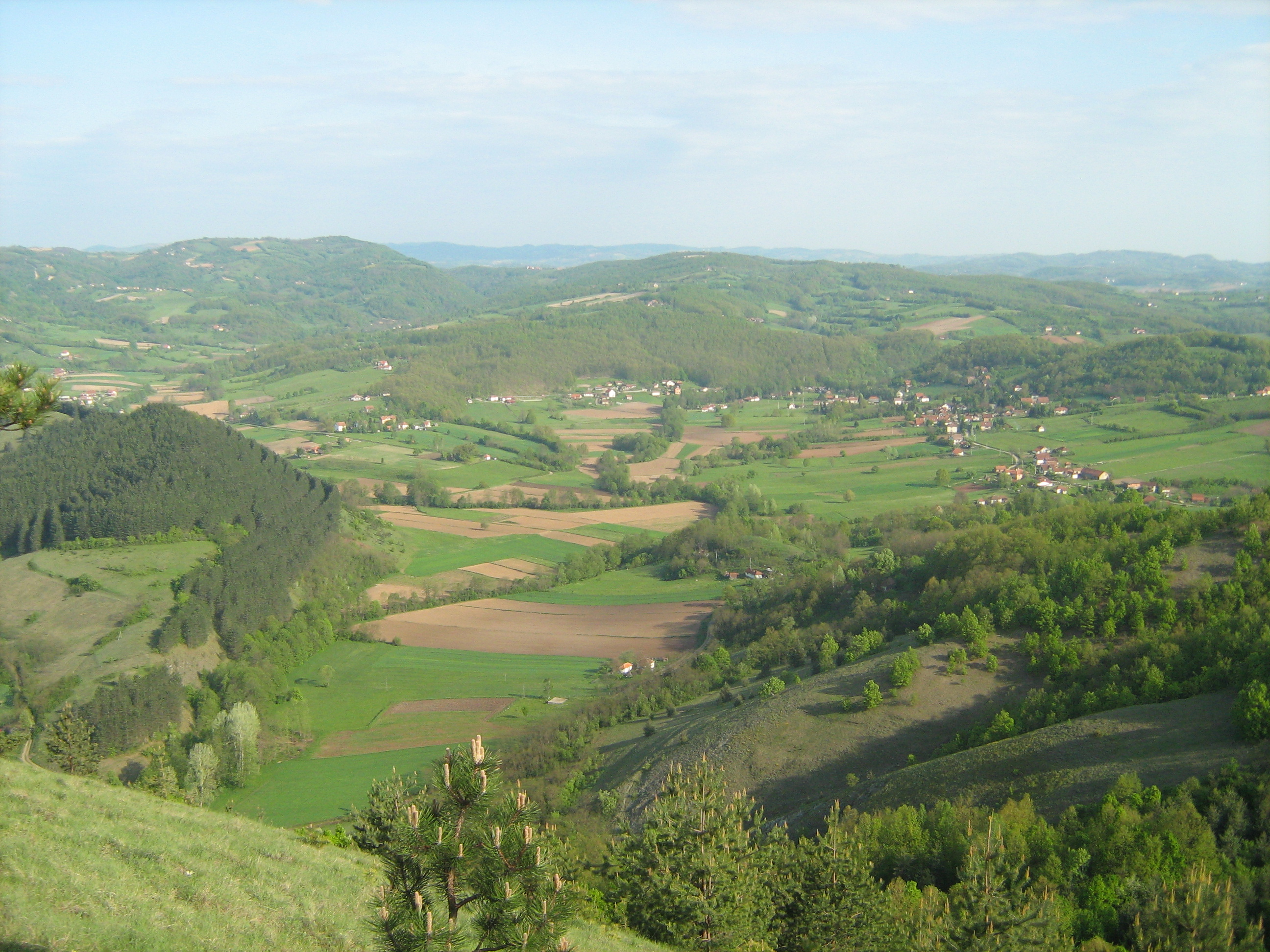

- Location within Serbia
- Coordinates: 44°01′N 20°22′E
- Country: Serbia
- District: Moravica District
- Municipality: Gornji Milanovac

Area
  - Total: 27.04 km^{2} (10.44 sq mi)
- Elevation: 396 m (1,299 ft)

Population (2011)
  - Total: 241
- Time zone: UTC+1 (CET)
  - Summer (DST): UTC+2 (CEST)

Šarani (Serbian Cyrillic: Шарани) is a village in the municipality of Gornji Milanovac, Serbia. According to the 2011 census, the village has a population of 241 people.

The name Savinac (Serbian Cyrillic: Савинац) is often identified with the village of Šarani. Savinac is a wider land area on the left bank of the Dičina River.

== History ==
The village was active in the Serbian Revolution, being organized into the knežina (administrative unit) of Brusnica (Takovo) during the First Serbian Uprising (1804–13). Among notable local revolutionaries were Sima Baralija, Dragoljub Matković, Stevan Markelja, Lazar Stankić and Jovan Belaković.

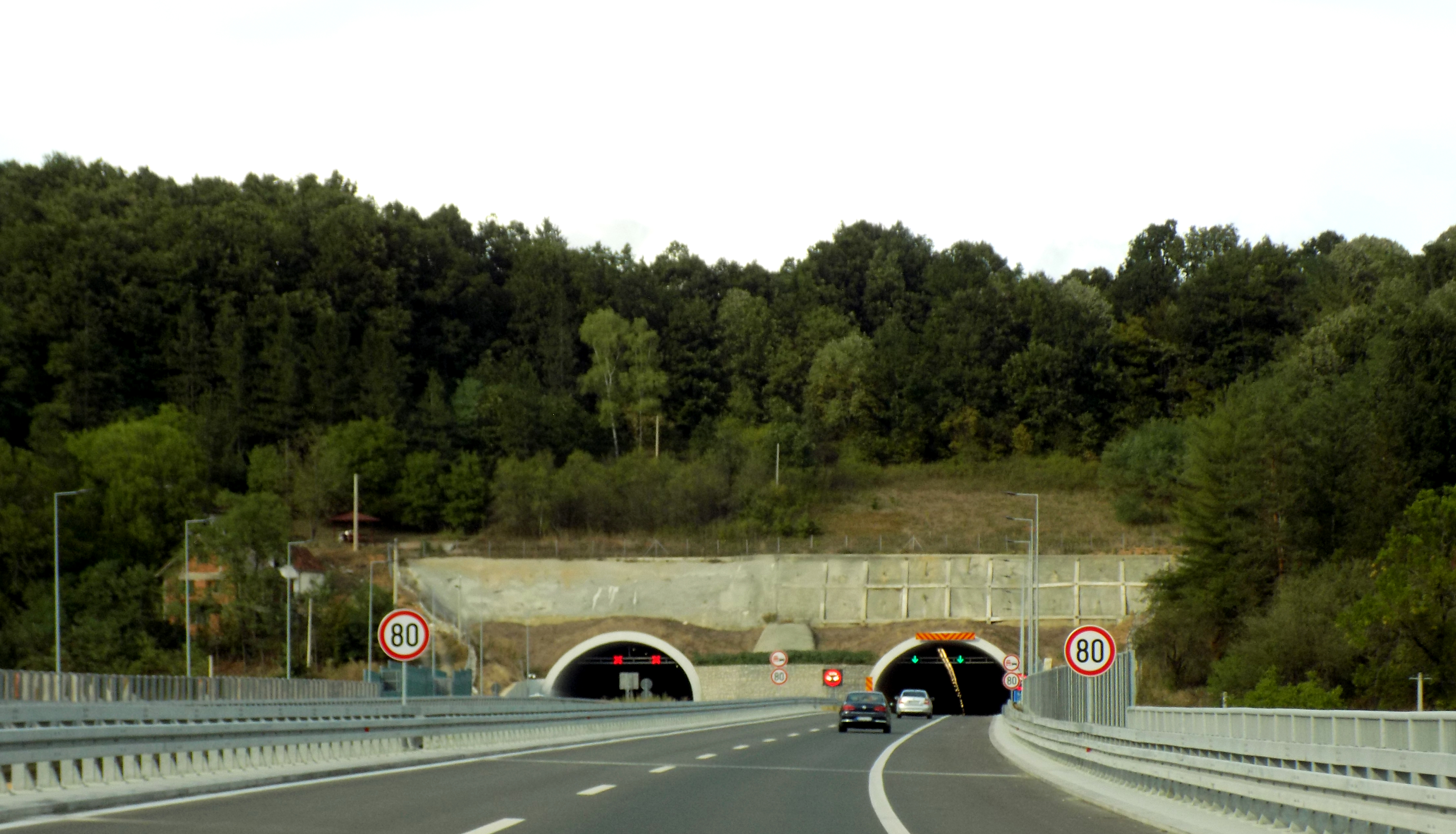
Motorway A2 in Savinac, opened in 2016
