= Ostružnica Bridge =

Bridge in Belgrade, Serbia

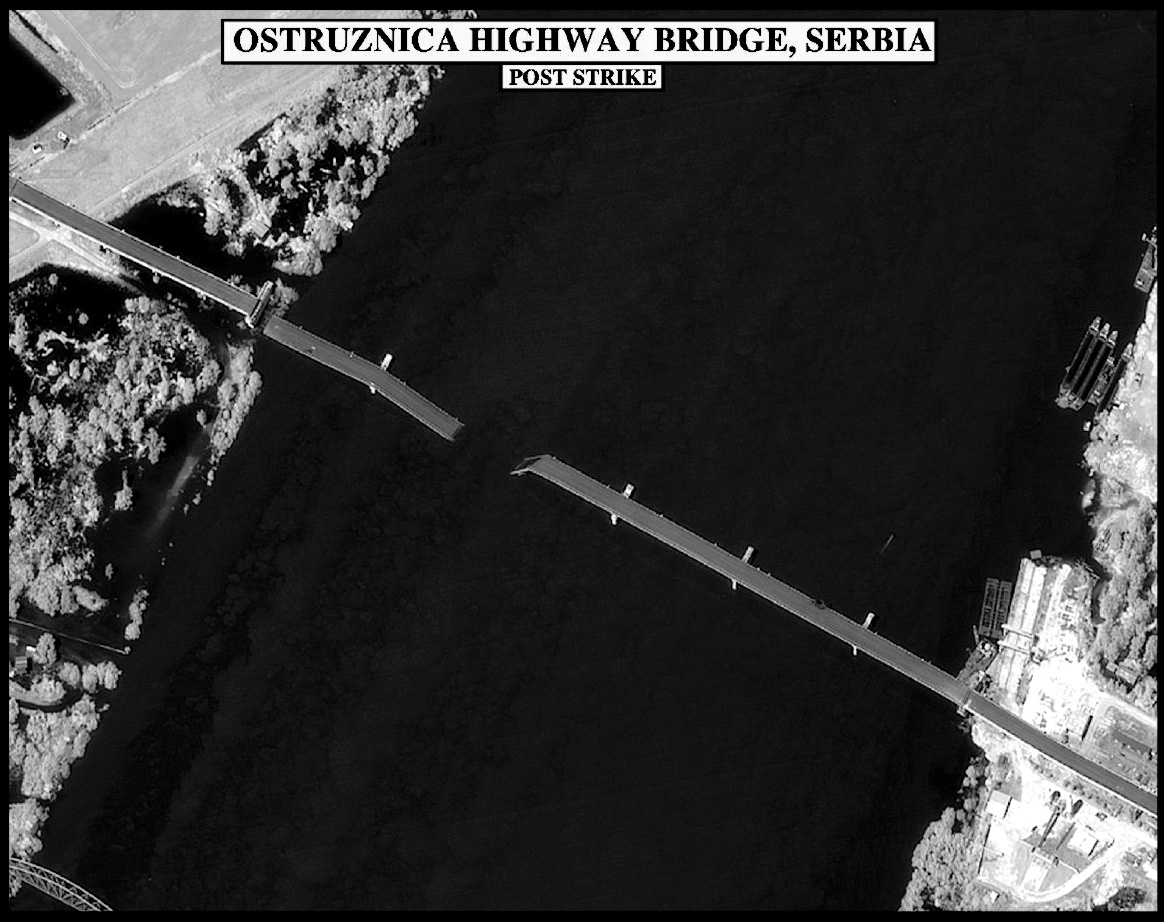
- Coordinates: 44.741968°N 20.319138°E
- Crosses: Sava

Ostružnica Bridge is a six-lane girder bridge carrying the Belgrade bypass over the Sava at Ostružnica.

== Original bridge ==
First half was constructed by Mostogradnja between 1990 and 1998. Total length of the bridge is 1,789.6 m (5,871 ft), with a 588 m (1,929 ft) long continuous steel structure crossing the river in five spans. The largest span is 198 m. The bridge was bombed by NATO during the Kosovo War in 1999 and fully reconstructed by 2004. Additional three lanes on the parallel, twin bridge were built from 2016 to 2020.

After the 2004 reconstruction, some damages on the bridge still remained. Also, the bridge has been used in the two-way capacity, though it was planned to be used only in the one-way direction. After new lanes were added in 2020, thorough reconstruction of the old section of the bridge began in July 2022.

== Twin bridge ==
Construction of the parallel, two-lane span began in January 2016. The original deadline was 26 months, or April 2018. It was then moved to March 2019. In May 2019 the end of construction was set to October 2019, and then to November. The delays were due to the change of the building technology after the construction began, possibility of unexploded mines in the river and an accident when the barge, turning in the zone of the construction site, hit the largest segment of the bridge construction which was to be lifted. The steel segments were constructed in the shipyard 10 km (6.2 mi) away, adapted into the floating objects and towed to the construction site. Some of the lifted bridge elements weighed up to 550 tons.

Two sides of the bridge were connected in December 2019. The works continued to slow down (strong winds, lack of qualified workforce, more expensive parts, winter, COVID-19 pandemic, additional problems after the final part was installed), so the deadline was moved to the end of the spring 2020. The second side of the bridge was officially opened on 14 June 2020. The reconstruction of the old bridge is planned to start when the new one is finished, hence all the traffic will be rerouted to the new bridge as soon as it is completed.

Older part of the bridge was then closed. Reconstruction of the upper section of the older bridge was finished by January 2023, when it was reopened for traffic.
