= Brotherhood and Unity Highway =

Highway in former Yugoslavia

Brotherhood and Unity Highway

Route information
- Length: 1,182 km (734 mi)

Major junctions
- From: Jesenice
- To: Gevgelija

Location

Highway system

The Brotherhood and Unity Highway (Serbo-Croatian: Autoput/Autocesta "Bratstvo i jedinstvo", Аутопут/Аутоцеста "Братство и јединство"; Macedonian: Автопат „Братство и единство“; Slovene: Avtocesta/Cesta bratstva in enotnosti), officially classed as the M-1 highway, was a highway that stretched over 1,182 km (734 mi) across Yugoslavia, from the Austrian border at Jesenice in the northwest via Ljubljana, Zagreb, Belgrade and Skopje to Gevgelija on the Greek border in the southeast. It was the main highway in the country, connecting four constituent republics and the country as a whole with neighboring highways.

== History ==
Through the late 1940s no direct road existed between Belgrade and Zagreb, a situation that John Gunther compared to Chicago and New York City lacking a road connection. Its construction began on the initiative of Communist Yugoslavia President Josip Broz Tito, who called the project the "Road of brotherhood and unity" (Autoput bratstva i jedinstva) after the motto of the League of Communists of Yugoslavia. The first section between Zagreb and Belgrade was built with the effort of the Yugoslav People's Army and volunteer Youth Work Actions and was opened in 1950. The section between Ljubljana and Zagreb was built by 54,000 volunteers within eight months in 1958. The southern section from Belgrade was not completed until 1963, thus coinciding with Skopje's reconstruction in the direct aftermath of the July 1963 earthquake. The Macedonian segments of the Brotherhood and Unity Highway would retain a less modernized infrastructure than other parts until the dissolution of Yugoslavia.

Its importance caused it to be colloquially named autoput or autocesta (generic Serbo-Croatian expressions for "highway", "motorway"). This use has since largely faded out, after the successor states built further motorways.

In the 1960s and 1970s the autoput became a much frequented holiday route for Turkish immigrants in West Germany and Austria (then called Gastarbeiter) visiting their original homeland during the summer vacation time, and for tourists to southeastern Europe. Entering communist but non-aligned Yugoslavia was far easier, for people from NATO countries such as West Germany and Turkey, than entering any of the Warsaw Pact communist countries of the Balkan region that might have provided alternative routes.

Originally an ordinary road, the carriageway was congested with cars and trucks, especially in summertime, when overtired long-distance drivers caused numerous accidents. Wrecked cars usually remained in place for long periods of time, providing a grim reminder of the dangers of the highway. The situation slightly improved after some parts were rebuilt to motorway standards (two lanes for each direction plus an emergency lane) on the following sections built between 1977 and 1991:

- Kranj–Ljubljana: 20 km (12 mi)
- Jankomir interchange (Zagreb bypass)–Slavonski Brod (east): 207 km (129 mi)
- Sremska Mitrovica–Belgrade–Niš: 277 km (172 mi)

In 1991, several sections were affected by the Yugoslav Wars, bringing severe damage, and causing the traffic to be almost completely discontinued in places.

== International categorization ==
Since 1975, the road was concurrent with the following routes of the International E-road network:

- European route E61: Villach–Kranj–Ljubljana
- European route E70: Ljubljana–Zagreb–Sisak–Slavonski Brod–Belgrade
- European route E75: Belgrade–Niš–Skopje–Veles–Thessaloniki

== Legacy ==
Since 1994 the route is also part of the Pan-European corridor X that extends from Salzburg to Thessaloniki. As of 2019, it is a motorway in its entire length through:

- Slovenia - the A2 motorway;
- Croatia - the A3 motorway;
- Serbia - the A3 motorway west of Belgrade and the A1 motorway south of Belgrade.
- North Macedonia - the A1 motorway.

The most difficult section to engineer and build was the 34 km (21 mi) Grdelica Gorge section which was completed in May 2019. The classification as the M-1 Highway continued in Serbia up to 2013, when the road was reorganized as the A1 and A3.

== Sources ==
- Sić, Miroslav (June 1990). "Problematika razvoja autocesta u Hrvatskoj i Jugoslaviji na pragu 90. godina" [Development of Motorways in Croatia and Yugoslavia on the Threshold of the Nineties] (PDF). Geografski glasnik (in Croatian). 52 (1): 13–29.
