= Prijevor (Čačak) =

Prijevor Пријевор
- Village
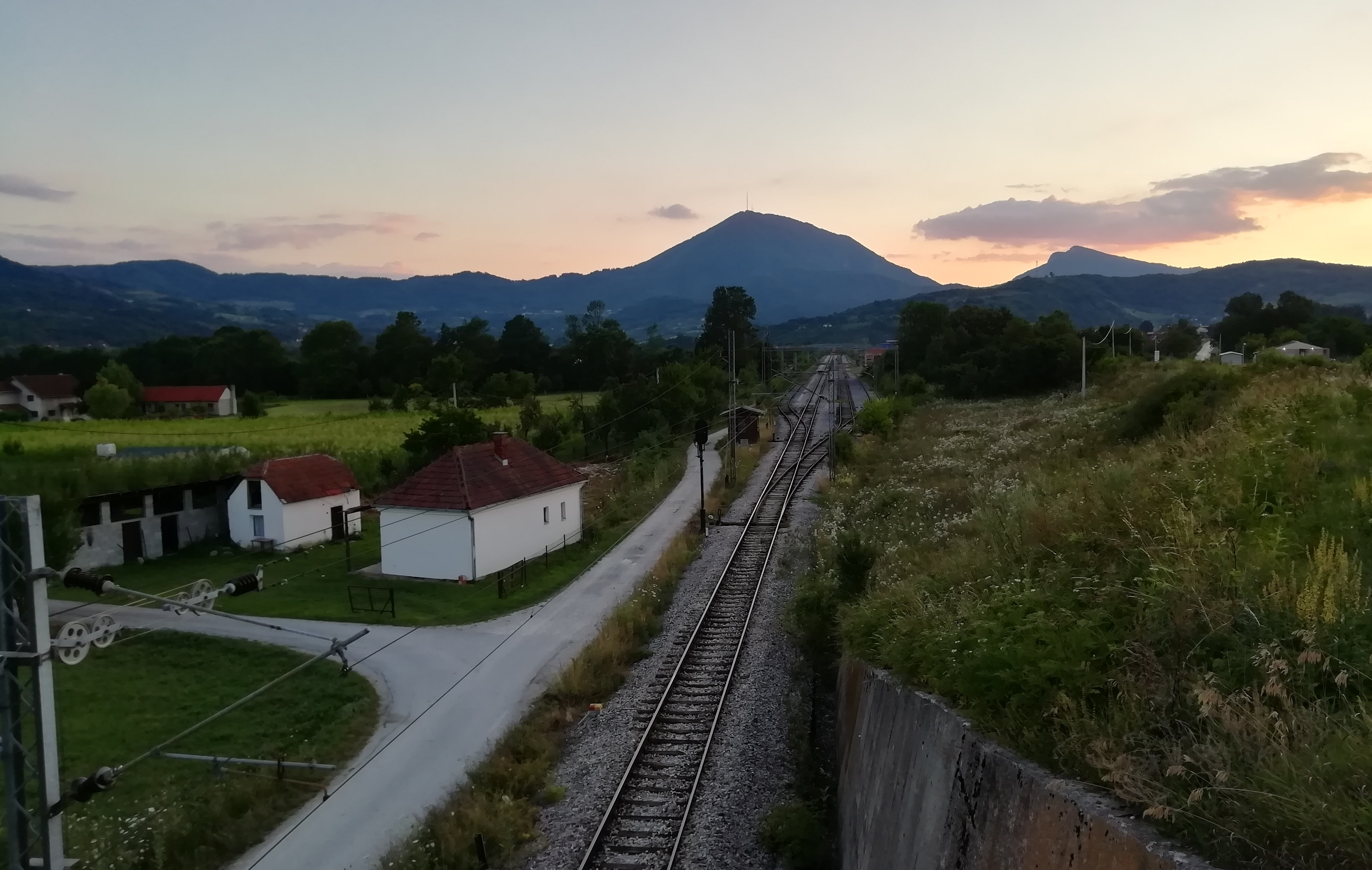
- Look on railway from overpass in Prijevor

- Location within Serbia
- Coordinates: 43°55′06″N 20°16′40″E
- Country: Serbia
- District: Moravica
- City: Čačak

Area
  - Total: 17.75 km^{2} (6.85 sq mi)
- Elevation: 241 m (791 ft)

Population (2011)
  - Total: 1,603
  - Density: 90.31/km^{2} (233.9/sq mi)
- Time zone: UTC+1 (CET)
  - Summer (DST): UTC+2 (CEST)

Prijevor (Serbian Cyrillic: Пријевор) is a village located in the city of Čačak, Serbia. According to the 2011 census, the village has a population of 1,603 people.
