= Boljare (Sjenica) =

Boljare Бољаре
- Village
- Location within Serbia
- Coordinates: 43°04′41″N 19°59′11″E
- Country: Serbia
- District: Zlatibor District
- Municipality: Sjenica

Area
  - Total: 12.04 km^{2} (4.65 sq mi)
- Elevation: 273 m (896 ft)

Population (2011)
  - Total: 33
  - Density: 2.7/km^{2} (7.1/sq mi)
- Time zone: UTC+1 (CET)
  - Summer (DST): UTC+2 (CEST)

Boljare (Serbian Cyrillic: Бољаре) is a village located in the municipality of Sjenica, Serbia. According to the 2011 census, the village has a population of 33 inhabitants. A border crossing between Serbia and Montenegro in planned to be constructed in the village as part of A2 motorway.
