= Mala Kopašnica =

Mala Kopašnica Мала Копашница
- Village
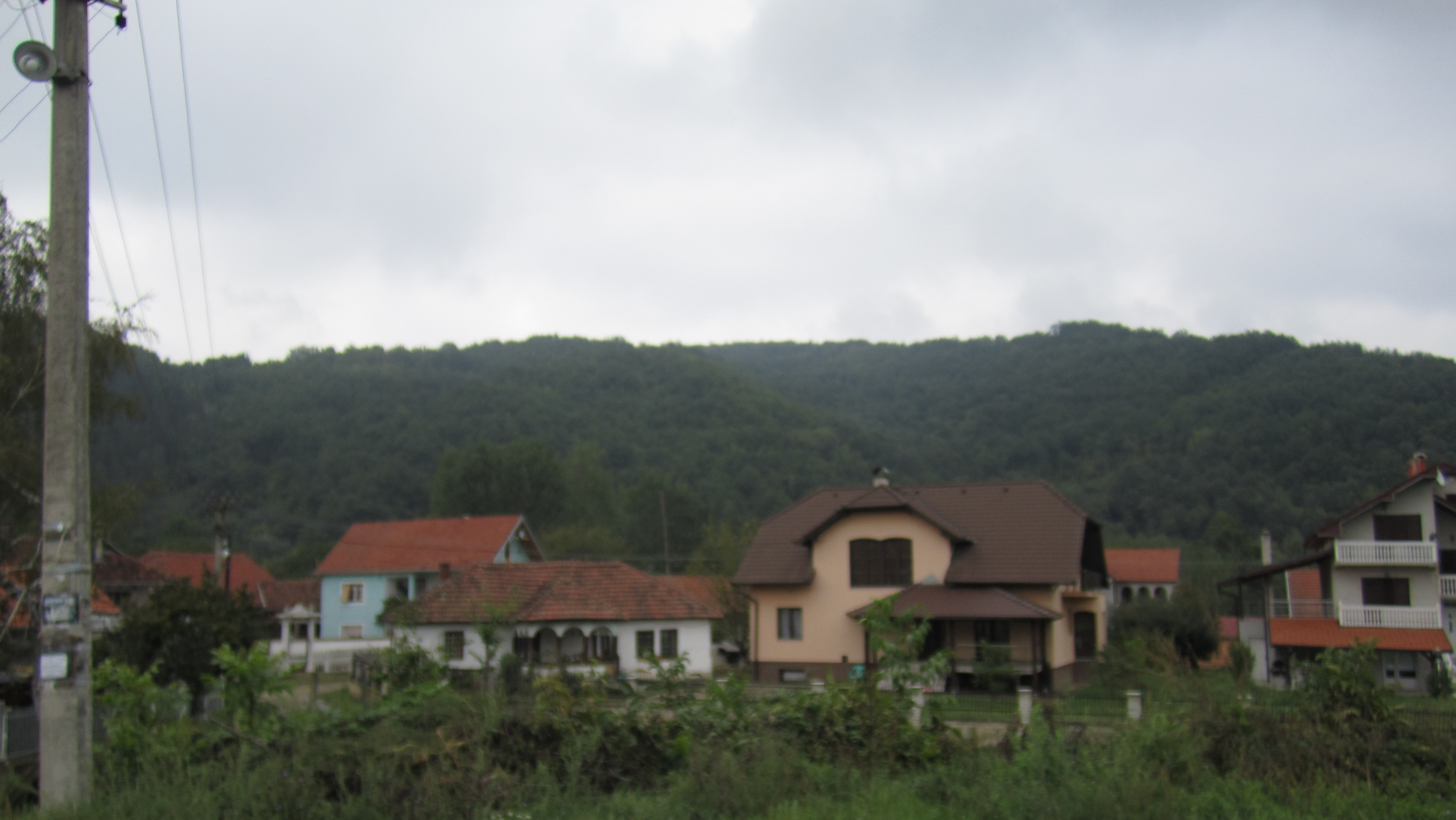

- Location within Serbia
- Coordinates: 42°54′53″N 22°02′45″E
- Country: Serbia
- District: Jablanica District
- Municipality: Leskovac

Population (2002)
  - Total: 255
- Time zone: UTC+1 (CET)
  - Summer (DST): UTC+2 (CEST)

Mala Kopašnica is a village in the municipality of Leskovac, Serbia. According to the 2002 census, the village had a population of 255.
