= Gradinje, Serbia =

Gradinje Градиње Gradina Градина
- Village
- Location within Serbia
- Coordinates: 43°01′N 22°48′E
- Country: Serbia
- Region: Southern and Eastern Serbia
- District: Pirot
- Municipality: Dimitrovgrad

Area
  - Total: 10.15 km^{2} (3.92 sq mi)
- Elevation: 551 m (1,808 ft)

Population (2011)
  - Total: 204
  - Density: 20.1/km^{2} (52.1/sq mi)
- Time zone: UTC+1 (CET)
  - Summer (DST): UTC+2 (CEST)

Gradinje (Serbian Cyrillic: Градиње) or Gradina (Serbian Cyrillic: Градина), known in Bulgarian as Gradine (Bulgarian: Градине) or Gradini (Bulgarian: Градини) is a village located in the municipality of Dimitrovgrad, Serbia. As of the 2011 census, the village has a population of 204 inhabitants, most of whom were Bulgarians. A border crossing between Serbia and Bulgaria is located in the village.
