= Predejane =

Predejane Предејане
- Town
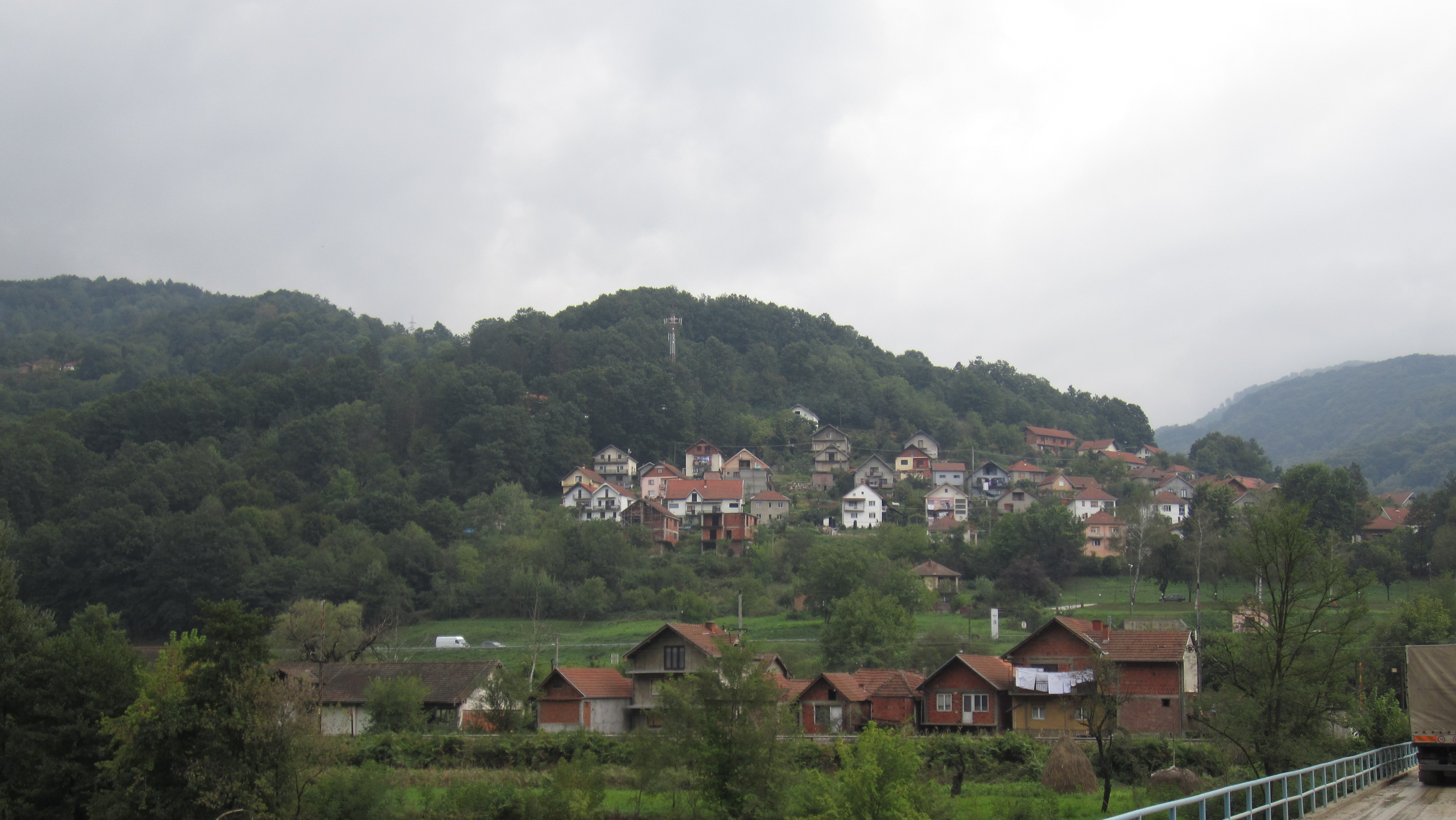

- Location within Serbia
- Coordinates: 42°49′46″N 22°07′52″E
- Country: Serbia
- District: Jablanica District
- Municipality: Leskovac

Population (2011)
  - Total: 1,088
- Time zone: UTC+1 (CET)
  - Summer (DST): UTC+2 (CEST)
- Postal code: 16222
- Area code: 016

Predejane (Serbian Cyrillic: Предејане) is a town in Serbia. It is situated in the Leskovac municipality, in the Jablanica District. The population of the village is 1,088 people (2011 census).
