= Šimanovci =

Šimanovci Шимановци (Serbian)
- Village (Selo)
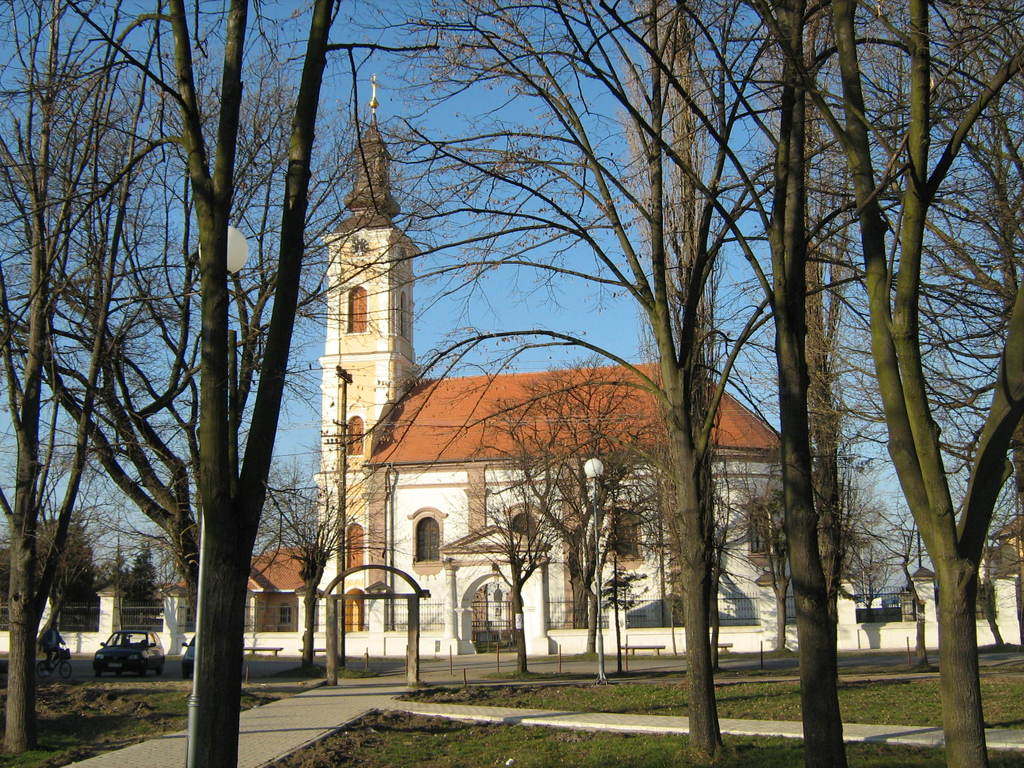
- Orthodox church in Šimanovci
- Interactive map of Šimanovci
- Location within Vojvodina Location within Serbia Location within Europe
- Coordinates: 44°52′N 20°05′E
- Country: Serbia
- Province: Vojvodina
- District: Srem
- Municipality: Pećinci

Population (2002)
  - Total: 3,358
- Time zone: UTC+1 (CET)
  - Summer (DST): UTC+2 (CEST)

Šimanovci (Serbian Cyrillic: Шимановци) is a village in Serbia. It is situated in the Pećinci municipality, in the Srem District of the Vojvodina Autonomous Province. The village has a Serb ethnic majority and its population numbering 3,358 people (2002 census).

== See also ==
- List of places in Serbia
- List of cities, towns and villages in Vojvodina
