= Markovac (Velika Plana) =

Markovac Марковац
- Town
- Location within Serbia
- Coordinates: 44°14′N 21°06′E
- Country: Serbia
- District: Podunavlje District
- Municipality: Velika Plana

Population (2002)
  - Total: 3,228
- Time zone: UTC+1 (CET)
  - Summer (DST): UTC+2 (CEST)

Markovac is a small town in the municipality of Velika Plana, Serbia. According to the 2002 census, the town has a population of 3228 people.
