= Preljina =

Preljina Прељина
- Village
- Location within Serbia
- Coordinates: 43°54′N 20°24′E
- Country: Serbia
- District: Moravica
- Municipality: Čačak

Area
  - Total: 12.53 km^{2} (4.84 sq mi)
- Elevation: 250 m (820 ft)

Population (2011)
  - Total: 1,840
  - Density: 147/km^{2} (380/sq mi)
- Time zone: UTC+1 (CET)
  - Summer (DST): UTC+2 (CEST)

Preljina (Serbian: Прељина) is a village located in the municipality of Čačak, Serbia. According to the 2011 census, the village has a population of 1,840 inhabitants.
