= Kuzmin, Sremska Mitrovica =

Kuzmin Кузмин (Serbian)
- Village (Selo)
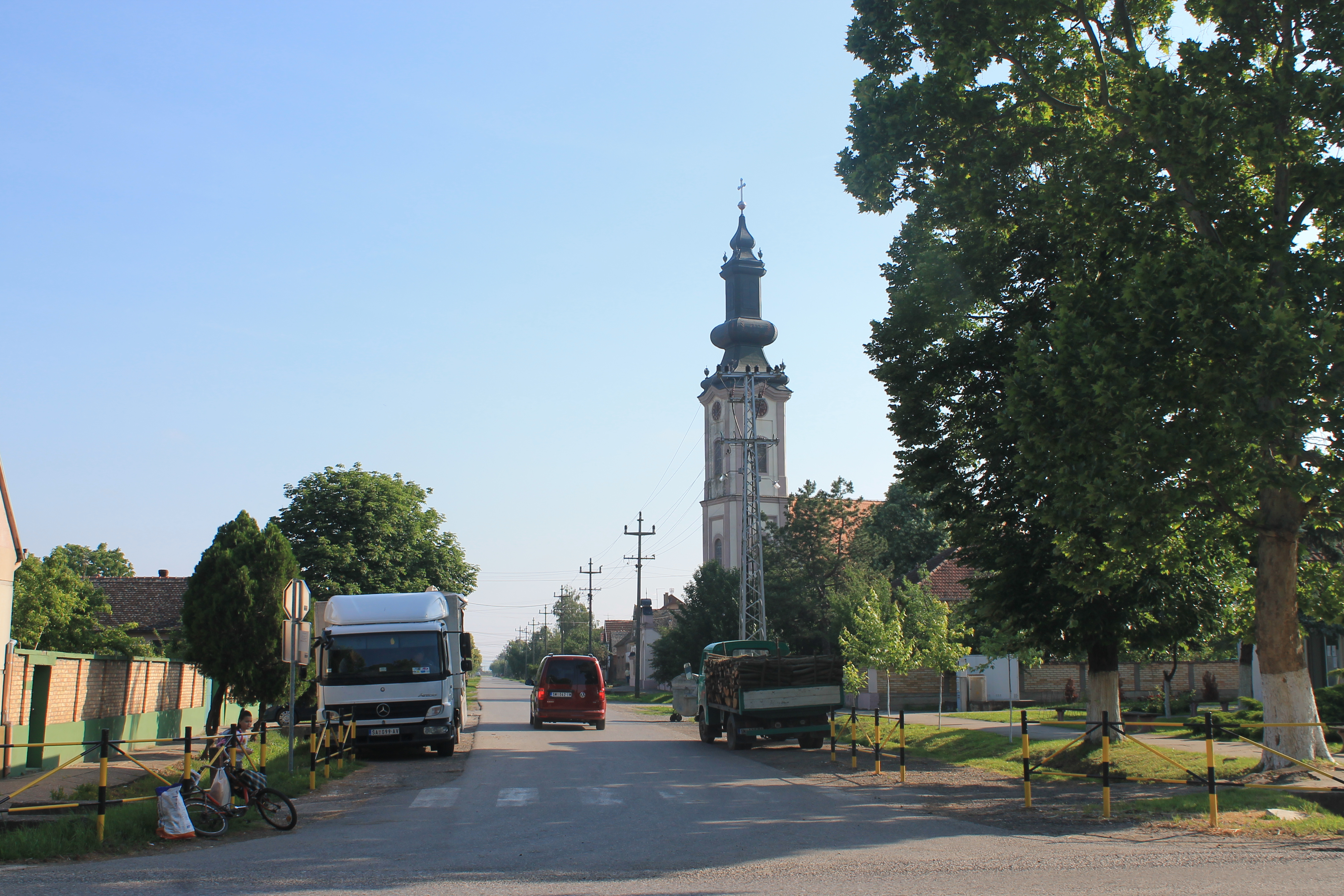
- Serbian Orthodox church
- Interactive map of Kuzmin
- Location within Vojvodina Location within Serbia Location within Europe
- Coordinates: 45°1′20″N 19°24′20″E
- Country: Serbia
- Province: Vojvodina
- Region: Syrmia
- District: Srem
- Municipality: Sremska Mitrovica

Area
  - Total: 58.77 km^{2} (22.69 sq mi)
- Elevation: 95 m (312 ft)

Population (2011)
  - Total: 2,982
  - Density: 50.74/km^{2} (131.4/sq mi)
- Time zone: UTC+1 (CET)
  - Summer (DST): UTC+2 (CEST)

Kuzmin (Serbian Cyrillic: Кузмин) is a village located in the municipality of Sremska Mitrovica, Serbia. As of 2011 census, the village has a population of 2,982 inhabitants.

== Name ==
In Serbian, the village is known as Kuzmin (Кузмин), and in Hungarian as Kozmadamján.

== History ==
Following Ottoman retreat from the region, the Lordship of Ilok and Upper Syrmia was established, and the village became part of its domain.

== Historical population ==
- 1961: 4,086
- 1971: 3,888
- 1981: 3,730
- 1991: 3,491
- 2002: 3,391

== See also ==
- List of places in Serbia
- List of cities, towns and villages in Vojvodina
