= Pojate =

Pojate Појате
- Village
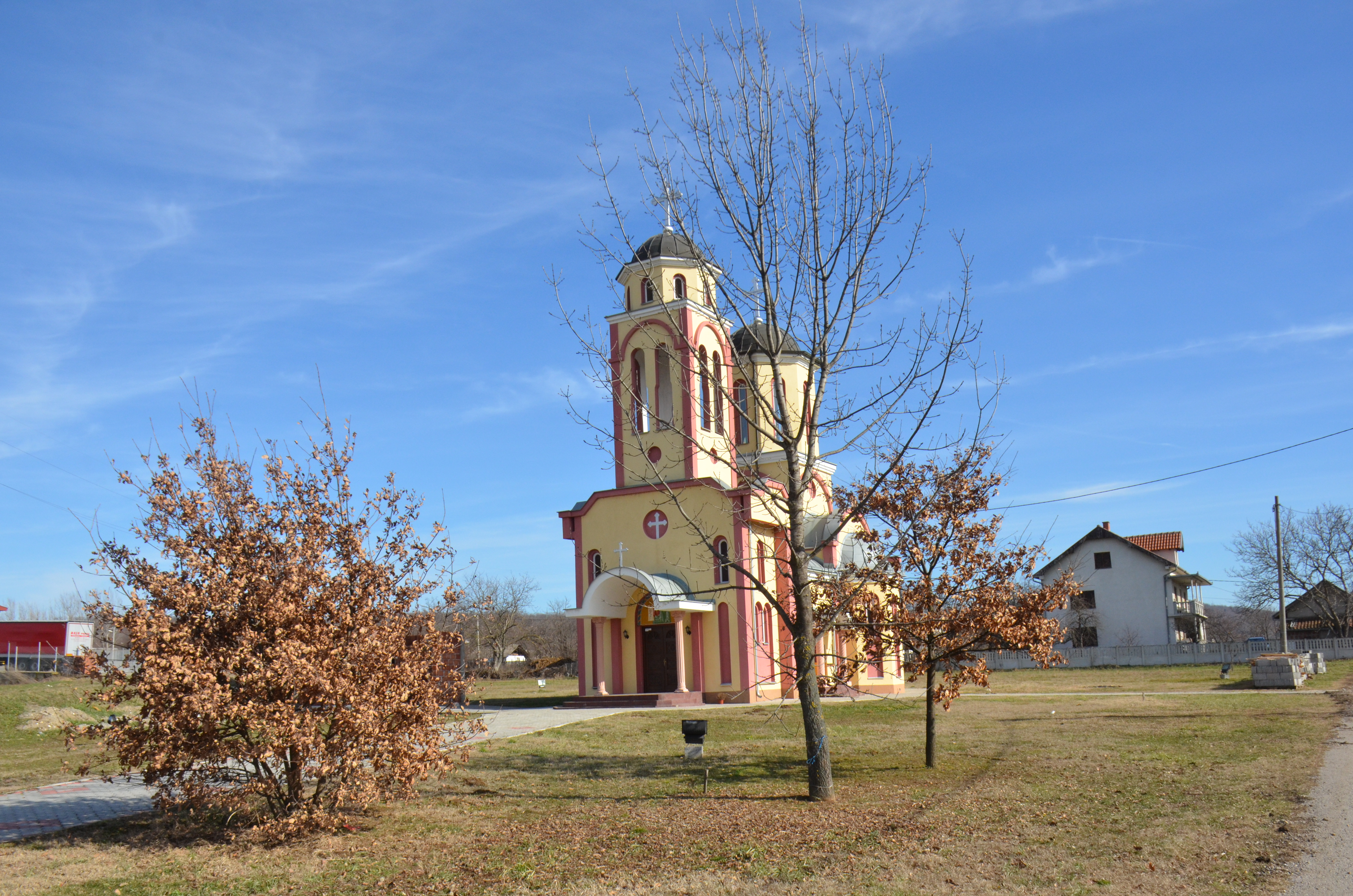
- An oak tree in Pojate

- Location within Serbia
- Coordinates: 43°44′33″N 21°27′23″E
- Country: Serbia
- District: Rasina District
- Municipality: Ćićevac

Area
  - Total: 10.04 km^{2} (3.88 sq mi)
- Elevation: 220 m (720 ft)

Population (2011)
  - Total: 846
  - Density: 84.3/km^{2} (218/sq mi)
- Time zone: UTC+1 (CET)
  - Summer (DST): UTC+2 (CEST)

Pojate (Serbian Cyrillic: Појате) is a village located in the municipality of Ćićevac, Serbia. According to the 2011 census, the village has a population of 846 inhabitants.
