= Batrovci =

Batrovci Батровци (Serbian) Batrovci (Slovak) Батровци (Pannonian Rusyn) Batrovci (Croatian)
- Village (Selo)
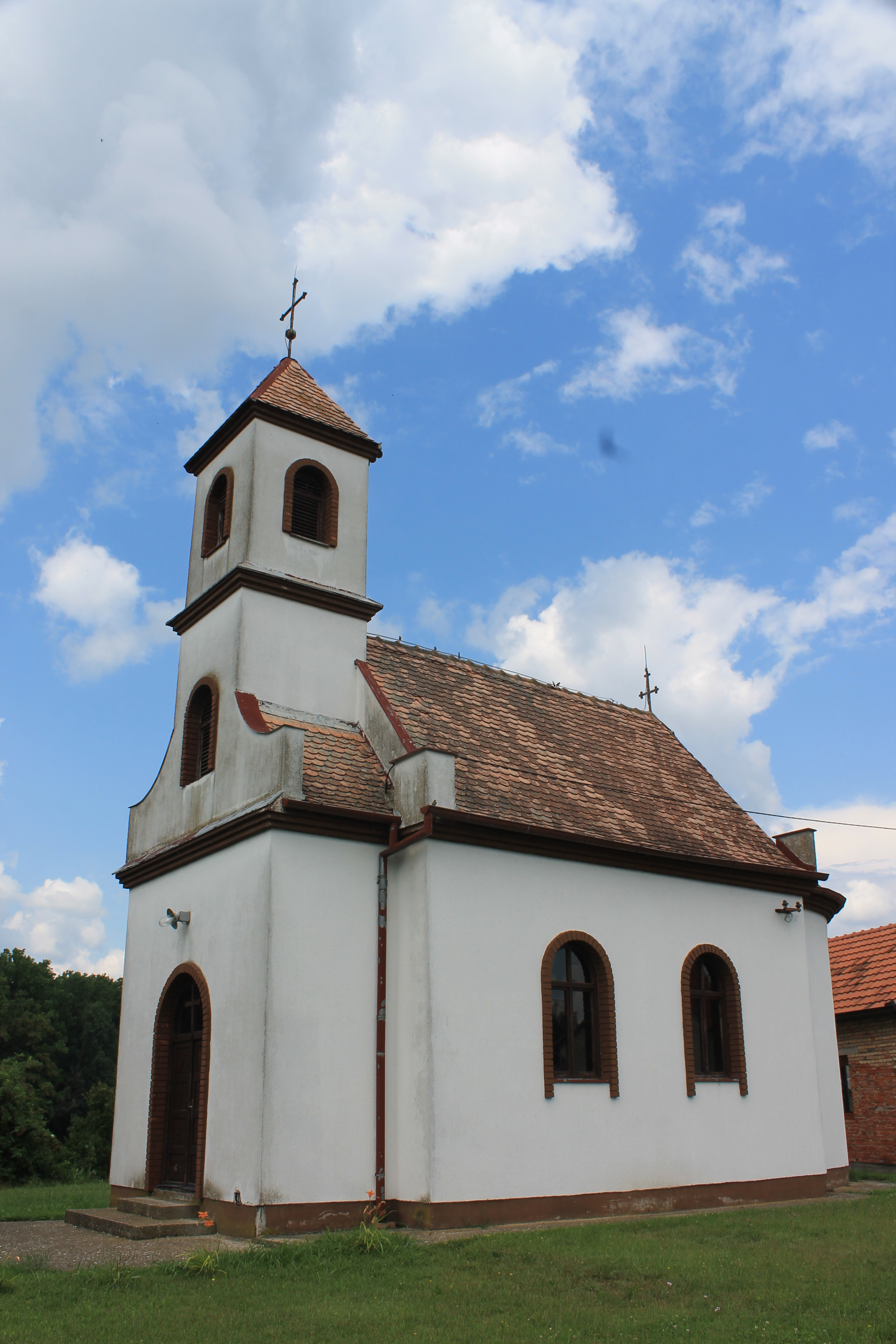
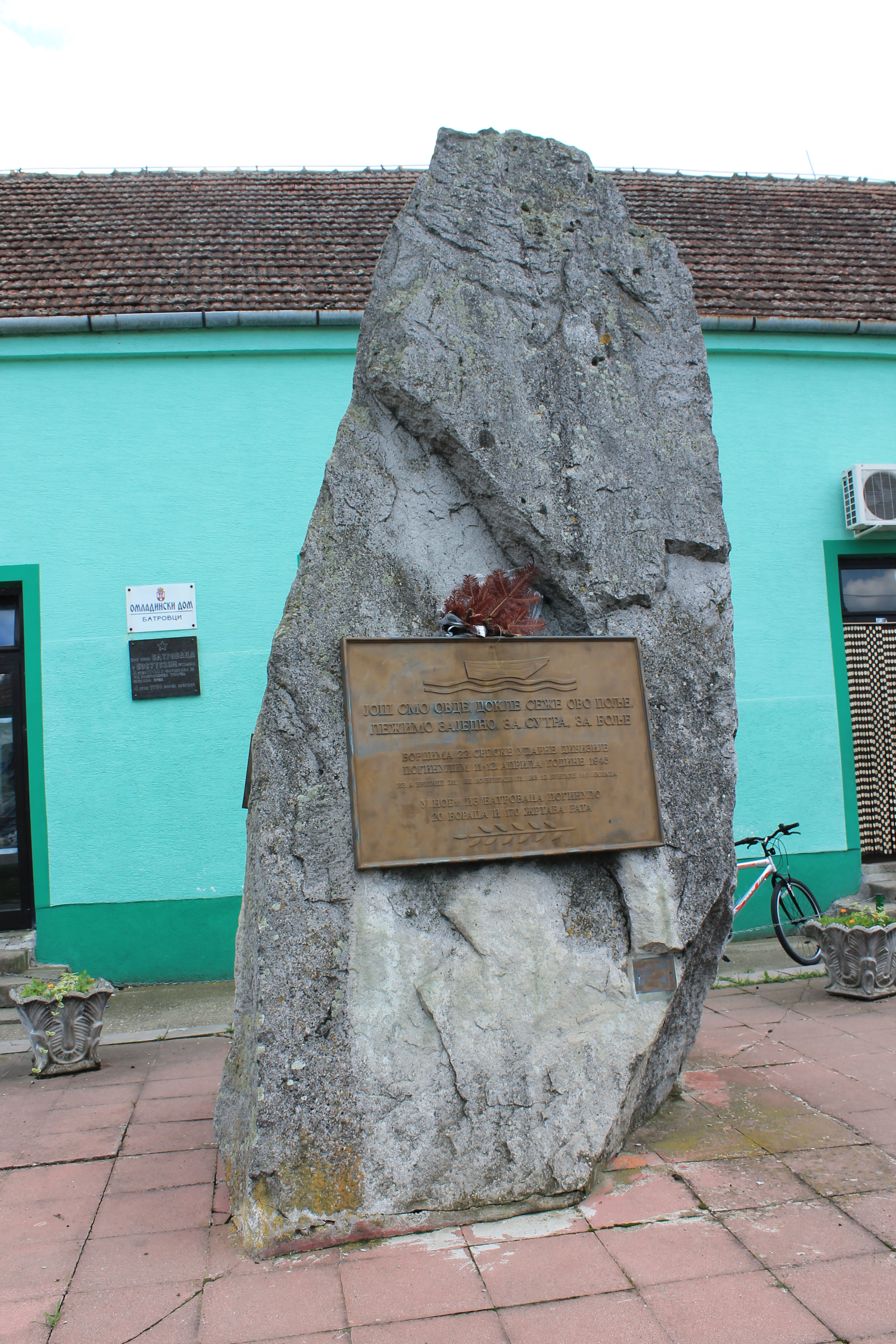
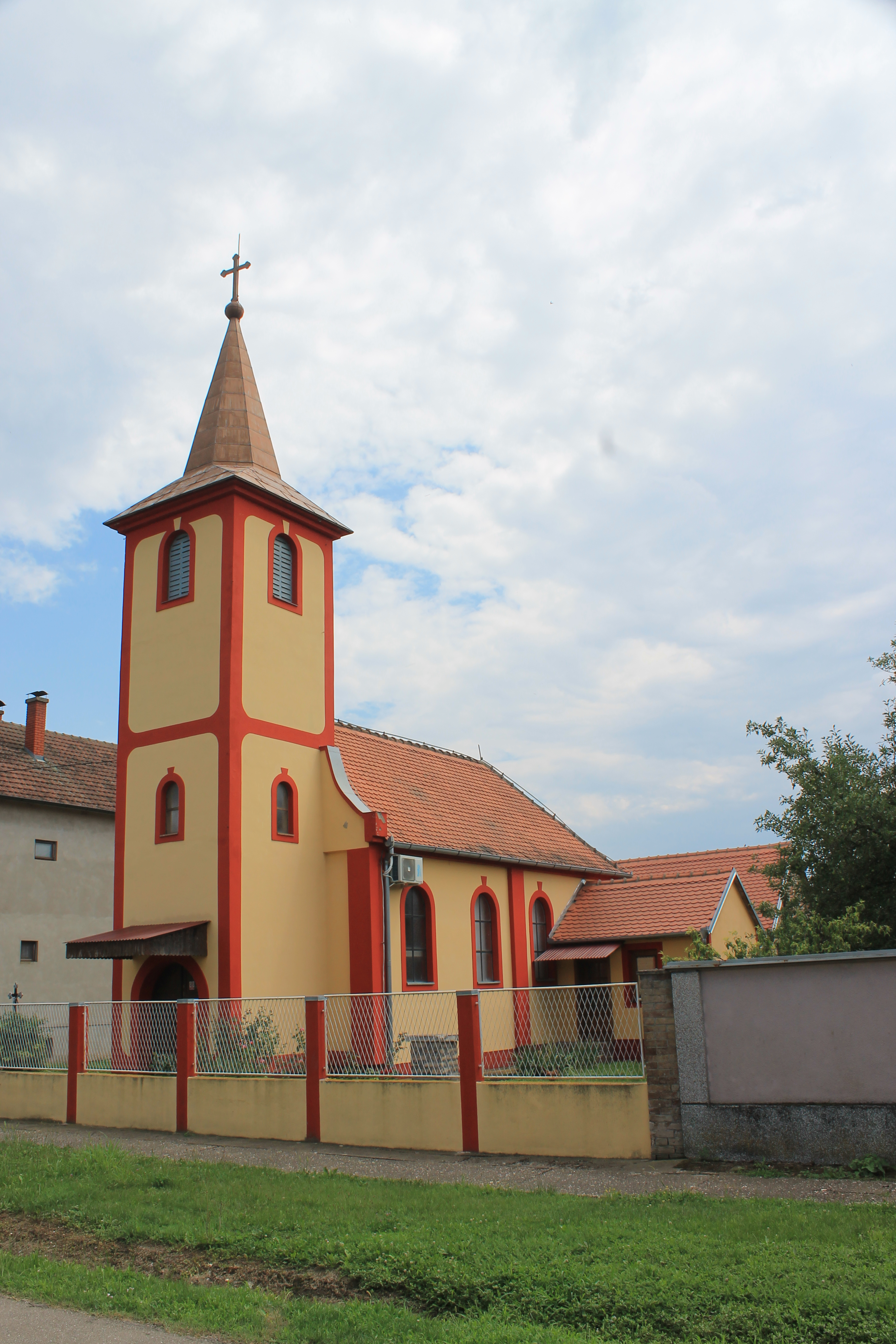
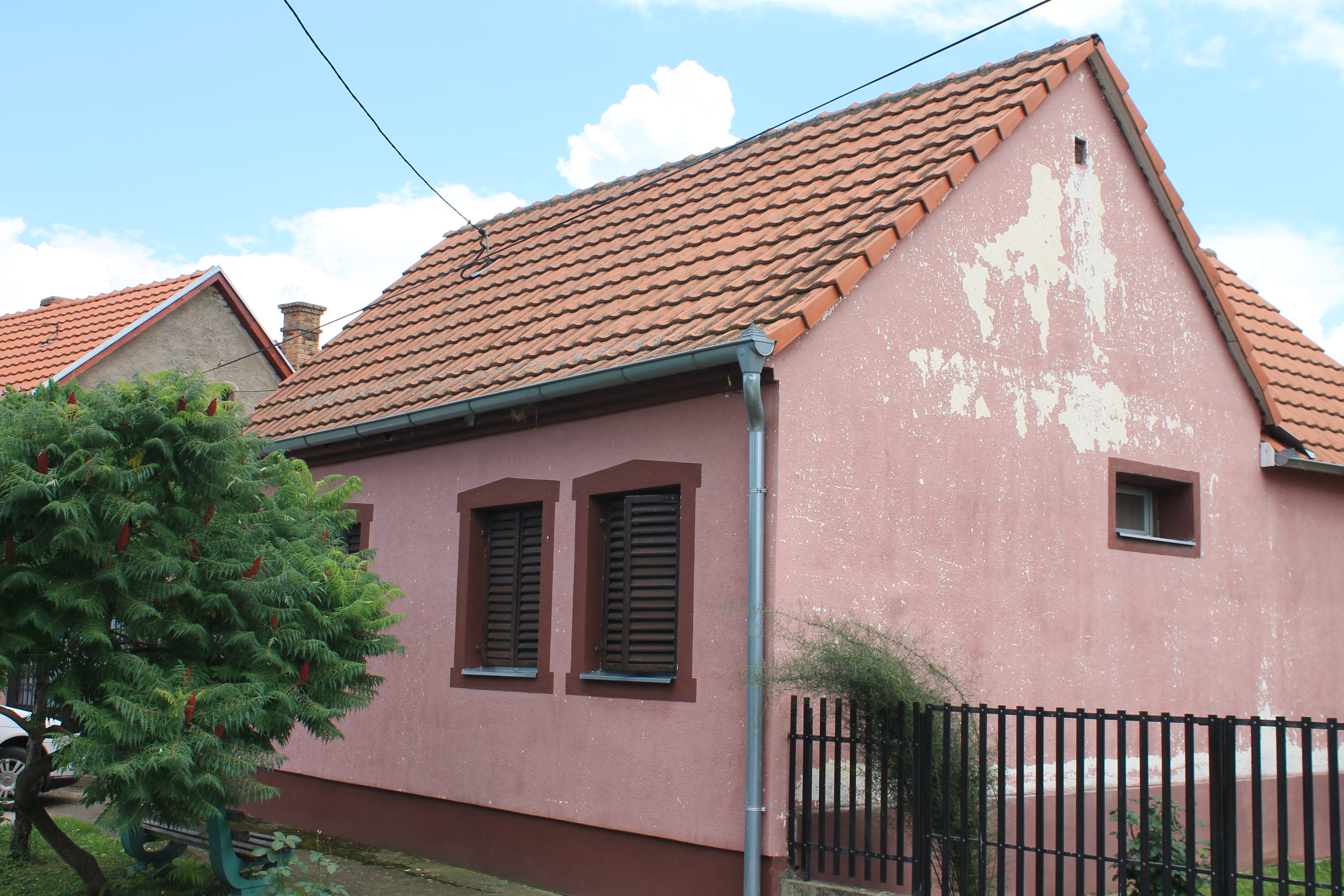
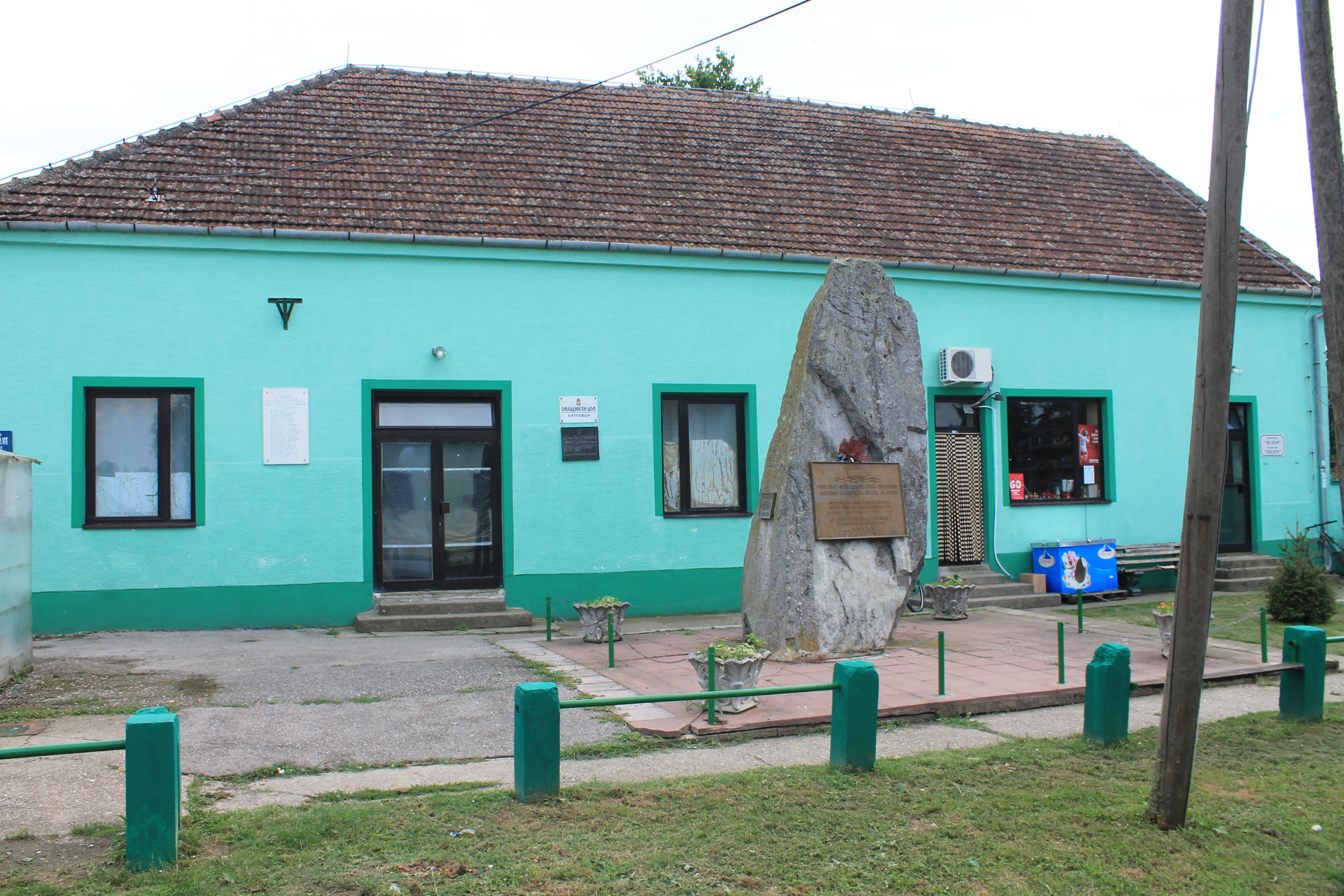
- Batrovci

- Location within Vojvodina Location within Serbia Location within Europe
- Coordinates: 45°03′N 19°08′E
- Country: Serbia
- Province: Vojvodina
- Region: Syrmia
- District: Srem
- Municipality: Šid

Area
  - Total: 29.53 km^{2} (11.40 sq mi)
- Elevation: 82 m (269 ft)

Population (2011)
  - Total: 259
  - Density: 8.77/km^{2} (22.7/sq mi)
- Time zone: UTC+1 (CET)
  - Summer (DST): UTC+2 (CEST)

Batrovci (Serbian Cyrillic: Батровци) is a village located in the municipality of Šid, Srem District, Vojvodina, Serbia. As of 2011, it has a population of 259 inhabitants. A border crossing between Serbia and Croatia is located in the village, on European route E70.

== Name ==
The name of the village in Serbian is plural.

== Historical population ==
- 1961: 653
- 1971: 577
- 1981: 464
- 1991: 399
- 2002: 320
- 2011: 259

== See also ==
- List of places in Serbia
- List of cities, towns and villages in Vojvodina
- Spačva basin
