= Pudarci =

Coordinates: 44°37′N 20°43′E

- Suburban settlement
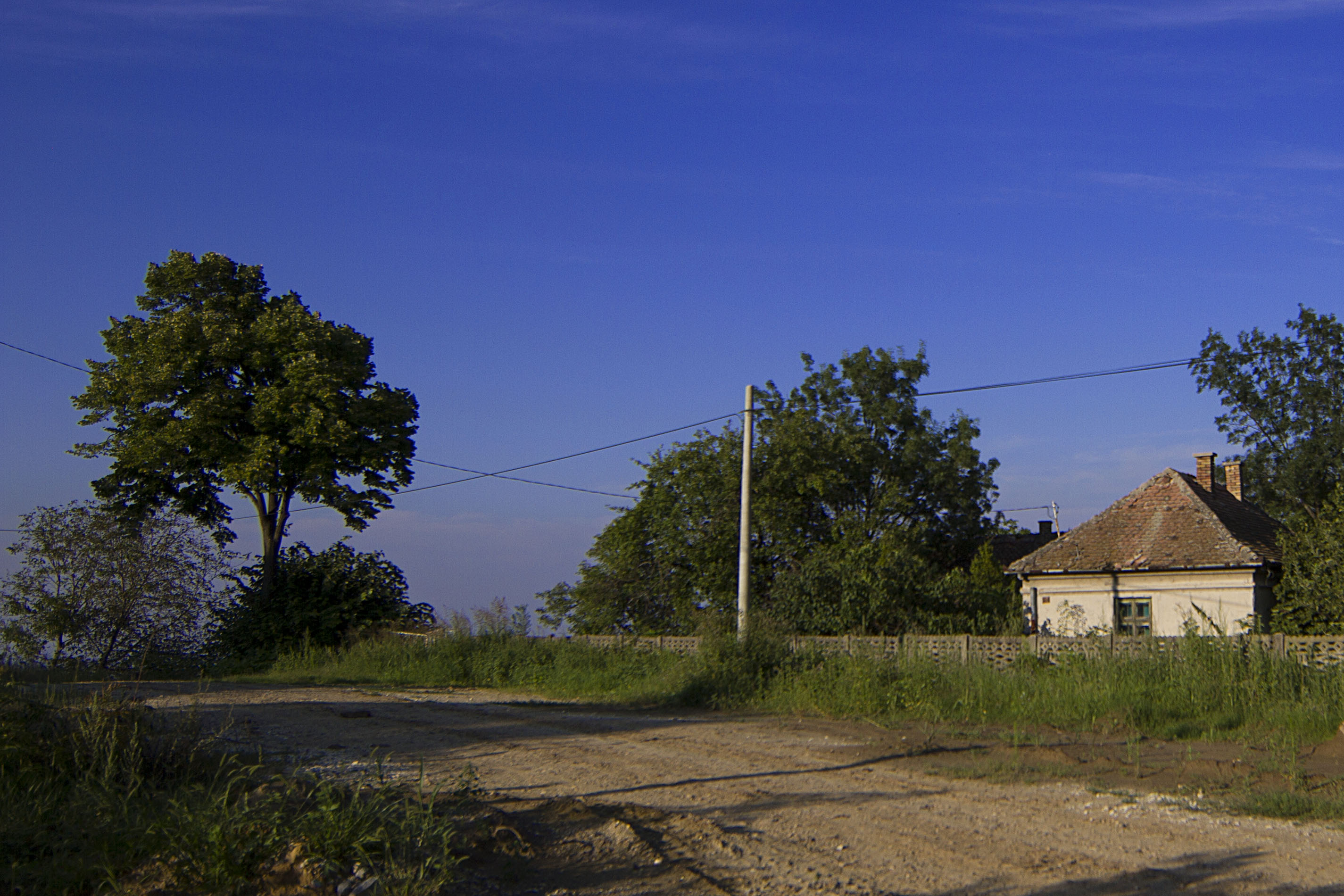
- Street of Pudarci
- Interactive map of Pudarci
- Country: Serbia
- Time zone: UTC+1 (CET)
  - Summer (DST): UTC+2 (CEST)

Pudarci (Serbian Cyrillic: Пударци) is a suburban settlement of Belgrade, the capital of Serbia. It is located in the Belgrade's municipality of Grocka.

Pudarci is located in the eastern part of the municipality, 41 km southeast of Belgrade and 7 km south of the municipal seat Grocka. It is on the crossroad of the Grocka-Umčari and Brestovik-Umčari roads, both of which connect the road of Smederevski put and the highway Belgrade-Niš. One branch of the road connects Pudarci with Kamendol, 2 km to the east.

Pudarci is classified as a rural settlement (village). It is a depopulating place, with a population of 1,536 in 1991 and 1,209 in 2022.

Local farmers grow fruit, including apples, pears, peaches and apricots. Around 2012, the city of Belgrade funded the construction of a pump station in Pudarci to improve agricultural irrigation in the area.

== See also ==
- List of Belgrade neighbourhoods and suburbs
