= Rančić =

Rančić (pronounced [râːntʃitɕ]) is a South Slavic surname. Notable people with the surname include:

- Bill Rancic (born 1971), American entrepreneur, husband of Giuliana
- Branimir Rančić (born 1953), Serbian medical doctor and politician
- Damir Rančić (born 1983), Croatian basketball player
- Giuliana Rancic (born 1974), Italian-American television personality and journalist, wife of Bill

== See also ==
- Rančić Family House, Grocka, Belgrade, Serbia
