= Milan Janković =

Milan Janković may refer to:

- Milan Janković or Philip Zepter, a Serbian entrepreneur
- Milan Janković (footballer, born 1959), Serbian football midfielder
- Milan Janković (politician), Serbian politician
