= Kamendol =

Coordinates: 44°37′N 20°45′E

- Suburban settlement
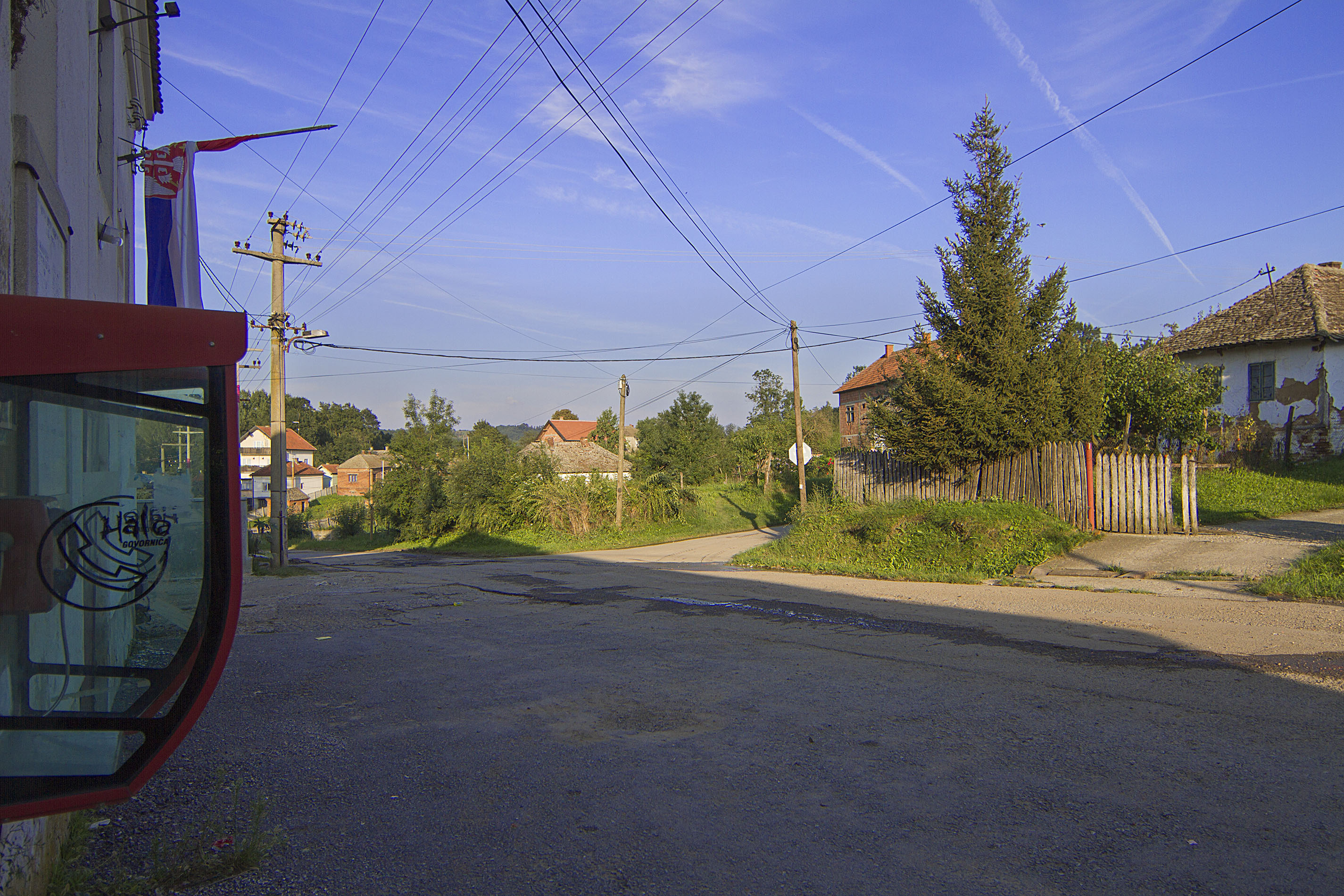
- Kamendol Village Center
- Interactive map of Kamendol
- Country: Serbia
- Time zone: UTC+1 (CET)
  - Summer (DST): UTC+2 (CEST)

Kamendol (Serbian Cyrillic: Камендол) is a suburban settlement of Belgrade, the capital of Serbia. It is located in the Belgrade's municipality of Grocka.

Kamendol is located in the eastern part of the municipality, near the border of the municipality of Grocka (and the City of Belgrade) and municipality of Smederevo (and the Podunavlje District). It is 10 km away from the municipal seat of Grocka, and over 40 km east of Belgrade. Kamendol is halfway on the Brestovik-Umčari road, which connects the road of Smederevski put and Belgrade-Niš highway.

Kamendol is a small, depopulating village (population of 1,372 in 1991 and 1,067 in 2002). The name of the village is Serbian for the rock valley.
