= Milan Janković (politician) =

Serbian politician (born 1954)

Milan Janković (Serbian Cyrillic: Милан Јанковић; born 21 August 1954), nicknamed Žire, is a politician in Serbia. He was a member of the National Assembly of Serbia from 2001 to 2007, has served three terms as mayor of the Belgrade municipality of Grocka, and is a current member of the Belgrade city council (i.e., the executive branch of the city government). Janković is a member of the Socialist Party of Serbia (Socijalistička partija Srbije, SPS).

== Early life and career ==
Janković was born in Umčari, Grocka (a year before the municipality's incorporation into Belgrade), in what was then the People's Republic of Serbia in the Federal People's Republic of Yugoslavia. He graduated as an economic technician.

== Politician ==
=== The Milošević years (1992–2000) ===
Janković was elected to the City Assembly of Belgrade for Grocka's fourth division in the May 1992 Serbian local elections and re-elected in the repeat elections in December of the same year. He was also elected to Grocka's municipal assembly and, in 1995, was chosen as its president (a position at the time equivalent to mayor).

He was re-elected to the Belgrade assembly in the 1996 Serbian local elections and also led the Socialist Party to a majority victory in Grocka, where he was confirmed as mayor for a second term.

During the 1990s, political life in Serbia was dominated by Slobodan Milošević, the leader of the Socialist Party, who oversaw the country's governmental institutions in an authoritarian manner. Milošević was defeated by Vojislav Koštunica of the Democratic Opposition of Serbia (DOS) in the 2000 Yugoslavian general election, an event that brought about wide-reaching changes in the country's political scene. The Socialist Party was dealt a significant defeat in the concurrent 2000 local elections in Belgrade, winning only four seats out of 110 in the city assembly; Janković was one of the four SPS members elected, winning again in Grocka's fourth division. The DOS won a narrow victory over the SPS for the Grocka municipal assembly in the same electoral cycle, and Janković's term as mayor came to an end.

Janković was a candidate for the national assembly on two occasions in the 1990s. He appeared in the forty-sixth (and final) position on the Socialist Party's electoral list for the Belgrade division in the 1993 Serbian parliamentary election and the eleventh (and also final) position on its list for the revised Voždovac division in the 1997 parliamentary election. The party won sixteen seats in Belgrade in 1993 and four seats in Voždovac in 1997; Janković was not selected for a mandate on either occasion. (From 1992 to 2000, one-third of the country's parliamentary mandates were assigned to candidates from successful lists in numerical order, while the remaining two-thirds were distributed amongst other candidates at the discretion of the sponsoring parties and coalitions. Janković could have been awarded a mandate on either occasion notwithstanding his list position, but in the event he was not.)

=== Parliamentarian (2001–07) ===
After Milošević's defeat in the Yugoslavian election, a new parliamentary election was held in Serbia in December 2000. For this election, the entire country was counted as a single electoral district and all mandates were awarded to candidates on successful lists at the discretion of the sponsoring parties or coalitions, irrespective of numerical order. Janković was given the seventy-fourth position on the SPS list, which was mostly alphabetical. The list won thirty-seven mandates, and he was selected for its parliamentary delegation when the assembly met in early 2001. The DOS won a majority victory in this election, and the Socialists served in opposition.

He was again included on the Socialist list in the 2003 Serbian parliamentary election and was given a new mandate when the list won twenty-two seats. In the term that followed, the Socialist Party provided outside support to a government led by the Democratic Party of Serbia (Demokratska stranka Srbije, DSS), the Serbian Renewal Movement (Srpski pokret obnove, SPO) and G17 Plus. Janković served on the committee for petitions and proposals and the committee on local self-government.

Janković was again included on the Socialist Party's lists in the 2007 and 2008 parliamentary elections, although he did not receive a mandate on either occasion.

Serbia introduced a system of proportional representation for local elections after 2000. Janković appeared on the Socialist Party's lists for both the Belgrade city assembly and the Grocka municipal assembly in the 2004 Serbian local elections and was re-elected to the latter body.

=== Since 2008 ===
Janković appeared on the Socialist Party's lists for both Belgrade and Grocka in the 2008 Serbian local elections. He did not initially take a seat in either assembly. On 19 August 2008, he returned to the city assembly as the replacement for another SPS member.

A shift in the municipal politics of Grocka saw the Socialists take a prominent role in the local coalition government and Janković return to mayor's office on 22 June 2010. He served in this role for the next two years.

Following a 2011 electoral reform, all mandates in Serbian elections were awarded to candidates on successful lists in numerical order. Janković was given the 101st position on the Socialist list for the Belgrade assembly in the 2012 Serbian local elections; this was too low for election to be a reasonable prospect, and he was not elected when the list won thirteen mandates. He also took the second position on the party's list in Grocka and was re-elected when the list won eight mandates. The Serbian Progressive Party (Srpska napredna stranka, SNS) won the election at the municipal level in Grocka, and Janković was succeeded as mayor by Dragoljub Simonović.

At the city level, the Democratic Party (Demokratska stranka, DS) won a minority government in the 2012 Belgrade election under the leadership of incumbent mayor Dragan Đilas. During this period, the Socialist Party was a minority partner with the DS in Belgrade's coalition government. On 28 December 2012, Janković was appointed to his first term on city council as the replacement for another party member. He served in this role until 24 September 2013, when the Socialists withdrew their support from Đilas's administration and the latter resigned as mayor.

Janković appeared in the thirty-third position on the Socialist Party's list in the 2014 Belgrade City Assembly election and missed election when the list won sixteen seats. He also appeared in the 119th position on the Socialist Party's list for the national assembly in the concurrent 2014 Serbian parliamentary election and was not elected when the list won forty-four seats.

The SNS became the dominant power in Belgrade's city government after the fall of Đilas's administration, and the SPS continued its role as a junior partner in the new coalition government. On 23 October 2015, Janković was re-appointed to city council as part of Siniša Mali's administration. He subsequently led the Socialist list in Grocka for the 2016 local elections and was re-elected when it won five mandates, although he soon resigned from the municipal assembly to continue serving on city council.

Janković was given the forty-ninth position on the Socialist Party's list in the 2018 Belgrade City Assembly election and was again not elected when the list fell to eight mandates. The SPS continued to participate in Belgrade's government, and Janković was confirmed for a third term on council in Zoran Radojičić's administration on 7 June 2018. He continues to serve in this role as of 2021.

== Electoral record ==
=== Local (City Assembly of Belgrade) ===
2000 City of Belgrade election Grocka Division IV
Mile Bugarčić	Serbian Renewal Movement	
Slobodan Đurđević	Serbian Radical Party	
Milan Janković – Žire (incumbent)	Socialist Party of Serbia–Yugoslav Left	Elected
Radovan Jelić	Democratic Opposition of Serbia	
Zoran Marković	Serb Party	
Slobodan Rakić	Serbia Together	
