= Dragoljub Simonović =

Dragoljub Simonović may refer to:

- Dragoljub Simonović (footballer)
- Dragoljub Simonović (politician)
