= Singidunum =

Ancient city that became Belgrade, Serbia

- Belgrade; Serbia
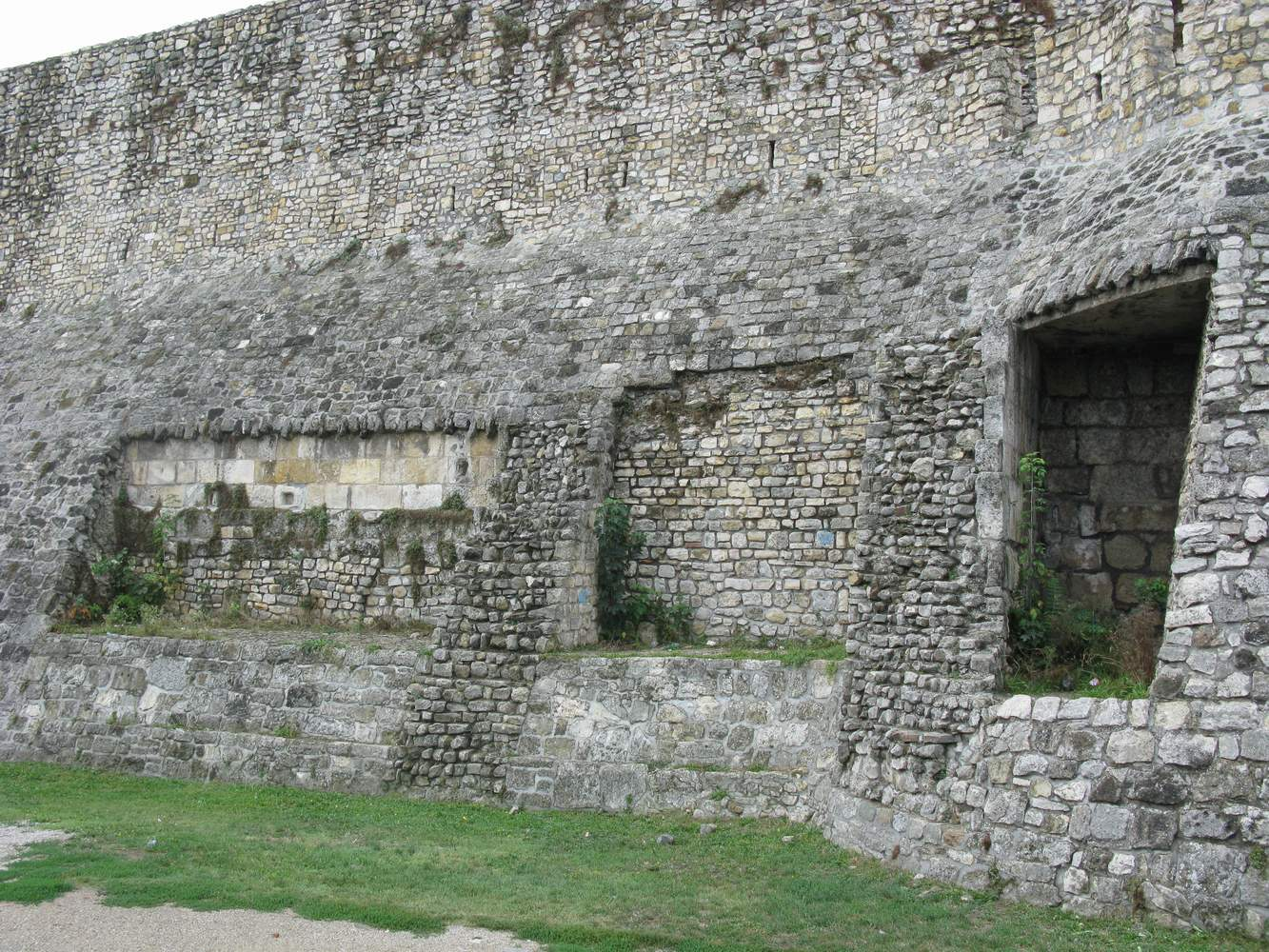
- Probing of the medieval walls of the Belgrade Fortress, where the walls of the Roman castrum Singidunum were discovered.

Site information
- Type: Fortification, mixed
- Open to the public: Yes

Location
- Coordinates: 44.82°N 20.46°E

Site history
- Built: 1st century
- Materials: Stone

Singidunum (Serbian: Сингидунум, Singidunum) was an ancient city which later evolved into modern Belgrade, the capital of Serbia. The name is of Celtic origin, going back to the time when the Celtic tribe Scordisci settled the area in the 3rd century BC, following the Gallic invasion of the Balkans. Later on, the Roman Republic conquered the area in 75 BC and incorporated it into the province of Moesia. It was an important fort of the Danubian Limes and Roman Legio IV Flavia Felix was garrisoned there since 86 AD. Singidunum was the birthplace of the Roman Emperor Jovian. It was sacked by Huns in 441, and by Avars and Slavs in 584. At the beginning of the 7th century, the Singidunum fort was finally destroyed.

A large part of Belgrade's downtown belongs to the "Archaeological Site of Singidunum", which was declared a protected zone on 30 June 1964.

== Celtic period ==
=== Origin ===
Scythian and Thracian-Cimmerian tribes traversed the region in 7th and 6th centuries BCE. The Gallic invasion of the Balkans occurred in the 4th and 3rd century BCE. One of the Celtic tribes, the Scordisci, settled around the strategic hilltop at the meeting of the two rivers (modern Danube and Sava). They are credited with establishing Singidunum, which was mentioned for the first time in 279 BCE as an already fortified settlement.

There is only limited archaeological evidence from the city's foundational period, as there were almost no traces left of the Celtic town, except for some burial sites with grave goods - the necropolises found at the locations in the modern neighborhoods of Karaburma and Rospi Ćuprija. These contained valuable artistic artefacts that belonged to the warriors of the Scordiscan tribe. Considerable Celtic cultural influence was woven into the spiritual culture of the Singidunum inhabitants, and later mixed with Roman classical cultural elements.

The Celtic fortification was a primitive one, located on top of Terazije ridge, above the confluence of the Sava into the Danube, where Belgrade Fortress still stands today. Celts also lived in small, open and fortified settlements around the fort, called oppida. Although it is not known with certainty where the Celtic fort was, some historians suggest that it was rather close to the necropolises in Karaburma and Rospi Ćuprija. Celtic settlements belonged to the La Tène culture.

Remains of the Scordisci habitation have also been found in the neighborhoods of Autokomanda, Bežanija, Ada Ciganlija and Ada Huja. Zemun, formerly a separate town and now part of Belgrade, was also founded by the Scordisci at about the same time they founded Singidunum. Evidence of their dwellings was also found in the suburban villages of Boljevci, Mislođin, Jakovo, Barič, Progar and Ritopek.

=== Name ===
The name has Celtic dūn(on) "enclosure, fortress" as its second element. For singi- there are several theories including those that it is a Celtic word for circle, though the only word with a similar form recorded in other Celtic languages is Old Irish seng "narrow, slender, good-looking; ant" (Modern Irish and Gaelic seang), hence "round fort", or that it could be named after the Sings, a Thracian tribe that occupied the area prior to the arrival of the Scordisci.

Herodotus names several tribes which inhabited the area in the 5th century BC: Sighnis, Graukens and Sinds, which, after the linguistic changes in the later Celtic and Roman periods, ultimately gave the name to the settlement. The Sinds were a Scythian tribe of Maeotian ethnicity. Originally inhabiting the area around the Kuban river and the Azov Sea, a branch of the tribe split in the 6th century BC and migrated to the southern parts of the Pannonian Basin, with one group remaining in Transylvania, while the other moved to the modern Belgrade area. The latest archaeological and linguistic researches showed that the Sinds inhabited the region in the 5th and 4th century BC.

Another possibility is that it is a composite name the first part of which (Sin-gi) means "Old prayer" ("sean guí" in modern Irish), implying that this was originally a site of Celtic religious significance, in addition to becoming a fortress (dun). This would also fit in with the ancient Celtic burial practice remnants there. However, etymologically speaking this is extremely unlikely. The Modern Irish form is sean-ghuí, and is from Old Irish sen-guidi, guidi being from the Common Celtic stem guedyo- "beg, implore, pray". Given the age of the name Singidunum, the expected form would be something like *senogwedyodunom, Latinised as *Senoguediodunum.

== Roman era ==
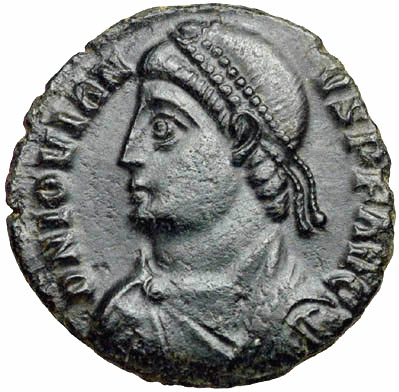
Flavius Iovianus, Roman Emperor from Singidunum.

The Romans first began to conquer lands surrounding Singidun during the 1st century BC. In 75 BC, Gaius "Quintus" Scribonius Curio, the proconsul of Macedonia, invaded the Balkan interior as far as the Danube, in an effort to drive out the Scordisci, Dardanians, Dacians and other tribes. The Romans had victories during these campaigns, but only stayed briefly, leaving the area outside of Roman control. Thus, very little is known about these operations or when the area was organized into the province of Moesia. It wasn't until the rule of Octavian, when Marcus Licinius Crassus, the grandson of the Caesarian Triumvir and then proconsul of Macedonia, finally stabilized the region with a campaign beginning in 29 BC Moesia was formally organized into a province some time before 6 AD, when the first mention of its governor, Caecina Severus, is made. Singidun was Romanized to Singidunum. It became one of the primary settlements of Moesia, situated between Sirmium (modern Sremska Mitrovica) and Viminacium (modern Kostolac), both of which overshadowed Singidunum in significance, and just across the Sava River from Taurunum, in Pannonia. Singidunum became an important and strategic position along the Via Militaris, an important Roman road connecting fortresses and settlements along the Danubian limes, or border. It became known as Limes Moesiae.

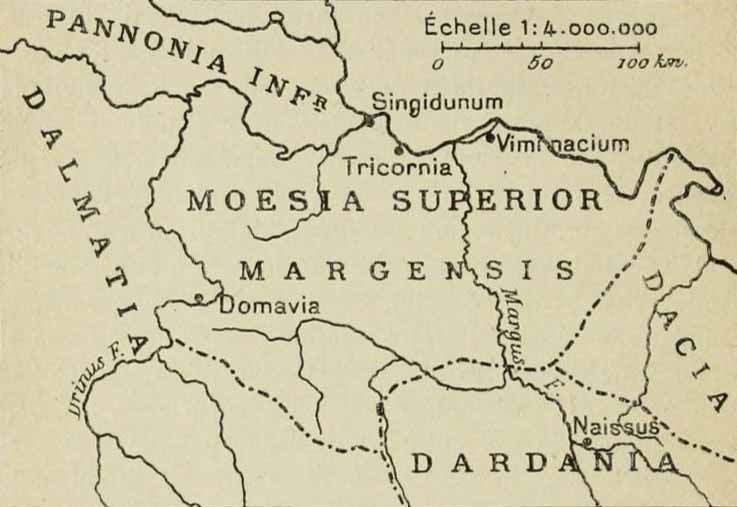
Moesia Superior

The original military camp was probably occupied by the soldiers from the Legio VIII Augusta from 46 AD to 69 AD. Early Singidunum reached its height with the arrival of Legio IV Flavia Felix which was transferred to the city in 86 AD and remained there most of the time until the mid 5th century. The presence of Legio IV prompted the construction of a square-shaped castrum (fort), which occupied Upper Town of today's Belgrade Fortress. Construction began at the turn of the 2nd century AD as since the early 100s, Legio IV Flavia Felix became permanently stationed in Singidunum, except for a break between 108 and 118/9 at Bersobis. At first, the fortress was set up as earthen bulwarks and wooden palisades, but soon after, it was fortified with stone as the first stone fort in Belgrade's history. The remains can be seen today near the northeastern corner of the acropolis. The legion also constructed a pontoon bridge over the Sava, connecting Singidunum with Taurunum. Connecting this way Via Militaris with the western parts of the empire, Singidunum became a major crossroad, not only for the local provinces (Moesia, Dacia, Pannonia, Dalmatia). The 6,000-strong legion became a major military asset against the continuous threat of the Dacians just across the Danube. Another step the Romans took to help strengthen Singidunum was the settlement of its legion veterans next to the fortress. In time, a large settlement grew out from around the castrum. The main axis of urban development was along the modern Knez Mihailova Street, which was the main route of communication (via cardo).

Hadrian granted Singidunum the rights of municipium, which were confirmed in 169. That means it had a local autonomy, statute and laws. Singidunum outgrew this status and became a full-fledged colony in 239. The Roman Emperor Jovian, who reestablished Christianity as the official religion of the Roman Empire, was born in Singidunum in 332. Jovian is today popularly named as the "only Roman emperor born in Belgrade", and has a street in the neighborhood of Veliki Mokri Lug. Singidunum and Moesia experienced a peaceful period, but that was not to last, due to the growing turmoil not only from outside the Roman Empire, but also from within. When the province of Moesia was divided in two, Singidunum became part of the Moesia Superior, or Upper Moesia.

The city peaked, especially when it comes to culture, in the 3rd century. The Roman Empire began to decline at the end of the 3rd century. The province of Dacia, established by several successful and lengthy campaigns by Trajan, began to collapse under pressure from the invading Goths in 256. By 270, Aurelian, faced with the sudden loss of many provinces and major damage done by invading tribes, abandoned Dacia altogether. Singidunum found itself once again on the limes of the fading Empire, one of the last major strongholds to survive mounting danger from the invading barbarian tribes.

Although continuing to be overshadowed by Sirmium, during the 4th century the city remained an important military outpost. It also became a seat of the bishopric, and was a major center of Arianism until late in the century, with its bishops Ursacius and Secundianus leading local resistance against Nicene Christianity until the First Council of Constantinople in 381.

Singidunum was damaged on a large scale for the first time in 378, by the invading Goths. The city was only partially restored after this event. In 395, upon the death of Theodosius I, the Roman Empire was split into two, with Singidunum lying on the northwestern border of the Eastern Roman Empire (better known as the Byzantine Empire).

=== Layout ===
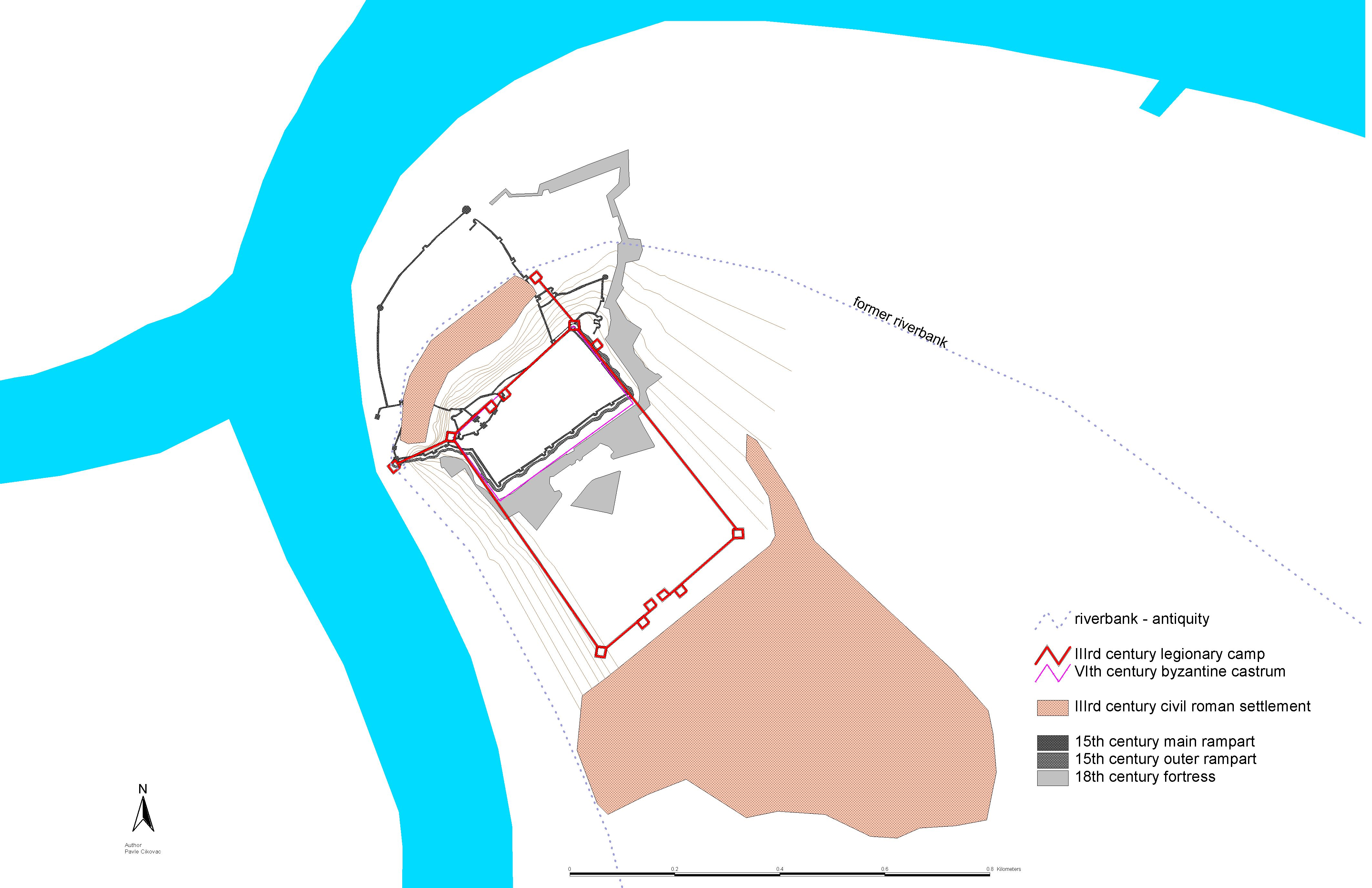
Development of the settlement

The city was designed by urban planning. It had a forum, temples, planned, structured and paved streets, aqueduct, sewage system, etc. The town took on a rectilinear construction, with its streets meeting at right angles. The grid structure can be seen in today's Belgrade with the orientation of the streets Uzun Mirkova, Dušanova, and Kralja Petra I. Studentski Trg (Students' Square) was a Roman forum, bordered by thermae (a public bath complex whose remains were discovered during the 1970s) and also preserves the orientation the Romans gave Singidunum. Other remnants of Roman material culture such as tombs, monuments, sculptures, ceramics, and coins have been found villages and towns surrounding Belgrade.

The area covered by Singidunum spreads over the territory of 5 modern municipalities of Belgrade. Castrum occupied part of today's Belgrade Fortress. Civilian zone spread from the Kralja Petra Street, over the both Sava and Danube slopes, till Kosančićev Venac, extending in a series of necropolises from Republic Square, along the Bulevar kralja Aleksandra all the way to the Mali Mokri Lug. Necropolis at Republic Square contained a well-shaped graves from the 1st century AD. In general, the largest section of the civilian settlement was situated between the modern Simina and Brankova streets, and the Republic Square. As for the Fortress itself, the rectangular castrum covered what is today the Upper Town of the Fortress and the Kalemegdan Park. The castrum had tall walls, built from the white Tašmajdan limestone and spread over the area of 16 ha (40 acres) to 20 ha (49 acres), being shaped as an irregular rectangle (approximately 570 by 330 m (1,870 by 1,080 ft)).

The area between the rivers and the castrum, Sava and Danube's alluvial plane, was occupied by a suburb Lower Town. Located below the castrum, it was protected by the ramparts and towers. South of the fort there was another suburb, a civilian Roman town. Next to the Lower Town, on the right bank of the Danube, there was a port, which was operational until the 18th century.

Modern Bulevar Kralja Aleksandra was a starting section of the 924 km (574 mi) long Via Militaris, which connected Singidunum and Constantinople, and in more local terms, Singidunum with fortresses and settlements along the Danube border of the Empire, like Viminacium. Built in the 1st century AD, the road was 6 m (20 ft) wide, with rows of shops, forges and arsenals, while Romans were buried along the road in stone sarcophagi. Archeological remnants of the Roman road can still be seen below the "Depo", former depot of the city's public transportation company. The majority of the boulevard's course is part of the "Ancient Singidunum" archeological locality.

The Romans extracted stone from the quarry located in the modern neighborhood of Tašmajdan, using it for the building of Singidunum, and for many surviving sarcophagi. An aqueduct used to conduct water from the modern Kumodraž area. At some point it joined the aqueduct from the Mokri Lug and then continued further to the castrum. Both Mokri Lug and Kumodraž are hills, so the natural inclination allowed for the water to flow downhill to Singidunum. The modern area of Cvetkova Pijaca was a location of three additional water systems. Aqueducts passed through the modern center of Belgrade, Terazije, and the main pedestrian zone, Knez Mihailova Street, which was one of the main access roads to the city and today still follows the original Roman street grid.

In the area bounded by the modern Karaburma, Rospi Ćuprija and, at that time island, Ada Huja, Romans cultivated grapevines and used thermal springs for public bathhouses.

=== Suburbs ===
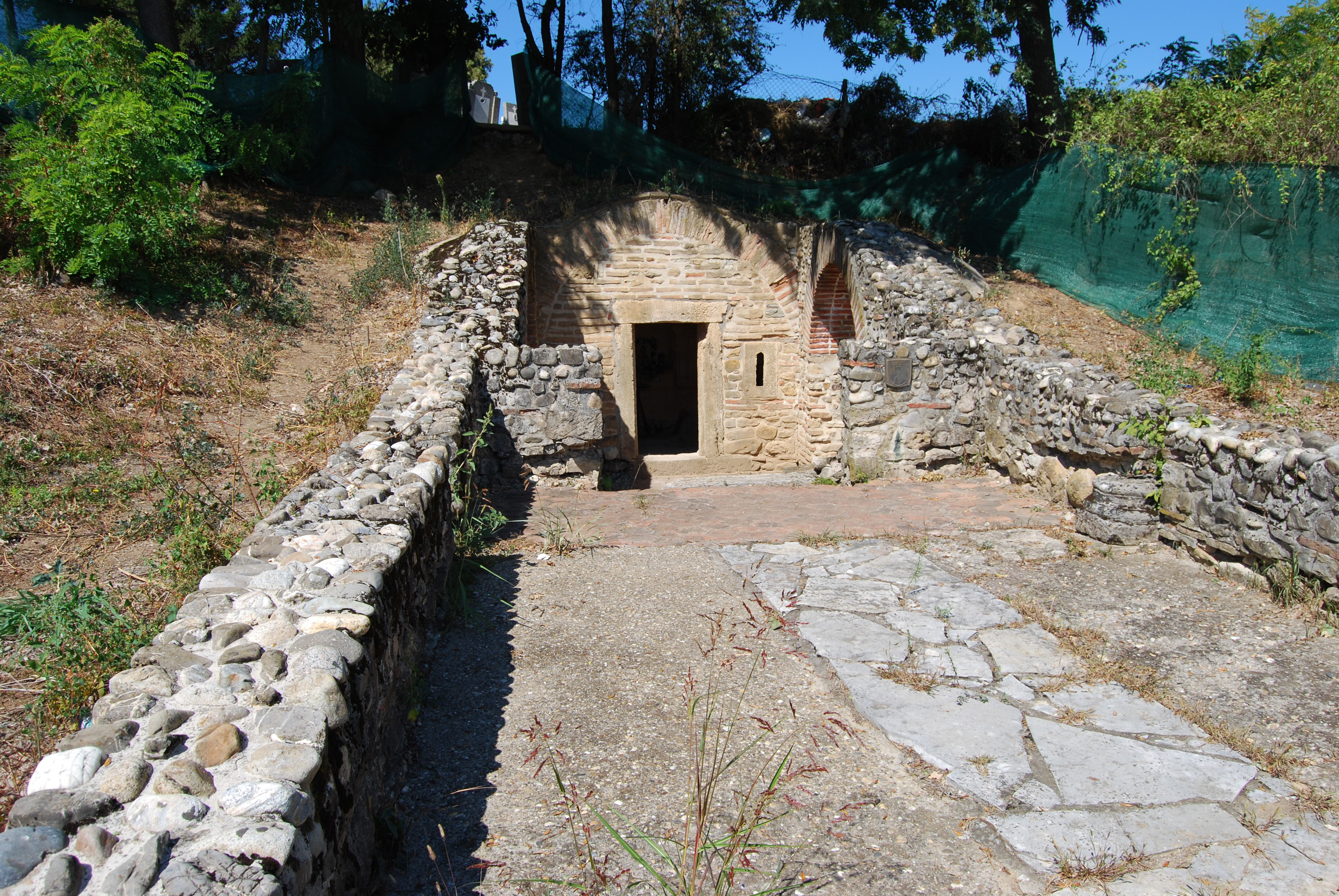
The Roman tomb in Brestovik

The main town and fortress in the vicinity of Singidunum was Taurunum, modern Zemun, across the Sava, on the right bank of the Danube. The Celtic settlement became Roman town in the 1st century AD and was later turned into the harbor for the Singidunum's Pannonian fleet.

There are remains from the Singidunum period in the modern suburban village of Brestovik, to the east, with three localized archaeological locations: "Podunavlje-Hladna Voda-Vrtlog-Mikulje", "Beli Breg" and "Goli Breg". There is a Roman tomb in Brestovik, dating from c. 300 and discovered in 1895. Evidence points to the tomb of a wealthy local (a military commander or a high ranked Singidunum clerk who was awarded with an estate), but the popular belief is that Hermylus and Stratonicus, the Christian "martyrs of Singidunum", were buried there. Three monumental stones, heavy up to 2 tones each, were also discovered. Carved reliefs point to some large public building from before the 4th century. Well preserved bust of emperor Macrinus (ruled 217–218) is discovered in modern village of Boleč, halfway between Belgrade and Brestovik, and close to the ancient Tricornium.

Tricornium (Latin for "three-horned fortification"), modern Ritopek, had an important military camp Castra Tricornia. The name originated from three distinctive hills dominating the landscape, one of which sank or was simply washed away into the Danube later. The settlement gave name to the Romanized Thracio-Celtic tribe of Tricornenses. A 258 AD ceremonial breast plate with stylistic illustrations belonging to Legio VII Claudia soldier Aurelius Herculanus has been found and many other artifacts of the Roman period such as silver coins that were washed ashore once the dam of the Iron Gate I Hydroelectric Power Station was constructed.

Tricornium was one of the forts, built to protect the Via Militaris. Other forts include Mutatio ad Sextum Militare (modern Grocka) and Mutatio ad Sextum (Mali Mokri Lug).

The top of the Avala mountain proved to be suitable for building, so the Romans built a fortified outpost, probably on the foundations of the older Celtic one. Apart from guarding and controlling the access roads to Singidunum, the outpost was also important for the protection of the numerous mines on the mountain, which were exploited by the Romans. They were extracting lead, zinc, silver and mercury, close to the modern Ripanj. The outpost was some 100 m (330 ft) below the top of the mountain. The outpost was a base for the future medieval fortress of Žrnov.

The neighboring mountain of Kosmaj was also rich in ores which were excavated by the Romans. In July 2000, during the excavations for the new sports complex in the village of Babe, a spring was discovered in the valley of the Pruten Creek. In the process, a hidden entry into the vast complex of Roman mines was discovered, too, being obscured for centuries. There is evidence of the extraction of silver, iron and lead. In the 3rd century AD, the Kosmaj mines were one of the most important in the Roman Empire, and were administered by the Roman procurator Babenius, whose name is preserved in the name of the Babe village. In the 1970s and 1980s, experts from the National Museum in Belgrade explored the area and discovered many mining necropolis, centered around the villages of Babe, Stojnik and Guberevac. It is estimated that there are some 100 ancient mining shafts on Kosmaj, which go 2 km (1.2 mi) below the ground and are 25 km (16 mi) wide. After the Roman period, mining activities ceased, only being revived in the Medieval Serbia.

In 1963, a tractor which was plowing the land in the neighborhood of Zemun Polje, in the vicinity of Školsko Dobro's central building began digging up on the surface the old coins, head of a sculpture, pottery pieces and numerous other objects. The National Museum in Zemun was notified and archaeologists examined the site. It was concluded that it was a Roman fort on the former Sirmium-Singidunum road. The previously unknown settlement was squarely shaped with the sides of 3 km (1.9 mi) and, at the time of discovery, was the largest known "outer suburb" of Singidunum.

== Byzantine rule and Migration Period ==
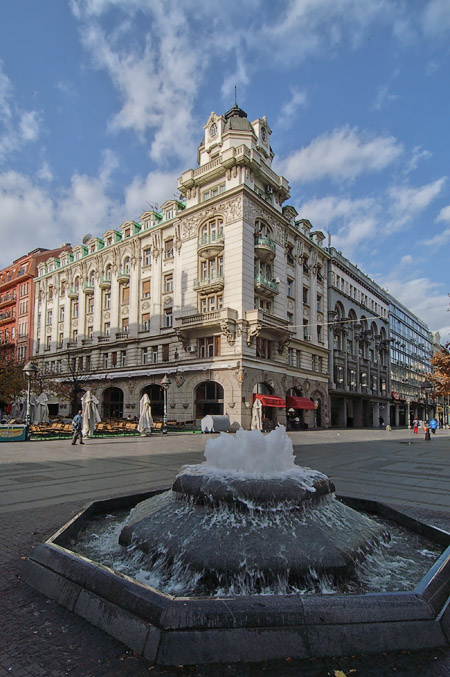
Ruski car Tavern at the corner of the Knez Mihailova and Obilićev Venac streets, which follow the original grid layout of Singidunum

In the 5th and 6th centuries, Moesia and Illyricum suffered devastating raids by the successive invasions of the Huns, Ostrogoths, Gepids, Sarmatians, Avars, Slavs and Herules. Singidunum fell to the Huns in 441, who razed the city and fortress to the ground, selling its Roman inhabitants into slavery, which they have done with all the cities along the limes. Over the next two hundred years, the city passed hands several times: the Romans reclaimed the city after the fall of the Hun confederation in 454, but the Sarmatians conquered the city shortly thereafter. In 470 the Ostrogoths seized the city around, expelling the Sarmatians. The city was later invaded by Gepids in 488, but the Ostrogoths recaptured it in 504. Six years later the Eastern Roman Empire reclaimed the city according to a peace treaty.

Byzantine emperor Justinian I rebuilt Singidunum from scratch in 535, restoring the fortress and city to its former military importance. Singidunum became an important border stronghold, however, Justinian rebuilt only the area within the former legion's camp. The city saw a brief peaceful period of about fifty years, but was then sacked with the arrival of the Avars in 584, though the Byzantines recaptured it in 596. The city remained under the constant attacks of the Avars and their allies at the time, Slavs. During Maurice's Balkan campaigns, Singidunum served as a base of operations, but it was lost again in the early half of the 7th century when the Avars sacked and burned Singidunum to the ground. The destruction of Singidunum and the collapse of the entire Limes Moesiae by the Avars occurred before 614 when Avars attacked the town of Niš, south of Singidunum. Around 630, the Slavs permanently settled in the area.

== Belgrade ==
After its fall to the Avars in the early 7th century, the ancient city ceases to be mentioned, and its fate on the subsequent centuries is obscure. There are no available historical records which mention settlement on this location from the late 6th century to the second half of the 9th century. However, the Slavs settled the city during this period and named it Beograd ("white city"), after the white Tašmajdan limestone, which Romans used to build the castrum.

Its Slavic name was mentioned for the first time in a letter written on 16 April 878 by Pope John VIII to Bulgarian prince Boris I Mihail, as Belgrade was then part of the First Bulgarian Empire. The Slavic settlement obviously existed for a while as the new name was evidently accepted, while the city was a seat of a bishopric since the pope mentions episcopatus Belogradensis ("bishop of Belgrade"). Under the new name, Belgrade would eventually be restored to its earlier strategic significance, especially after it was reconquered by the Byzantines.

== Archaeology ==
=== Overview ===
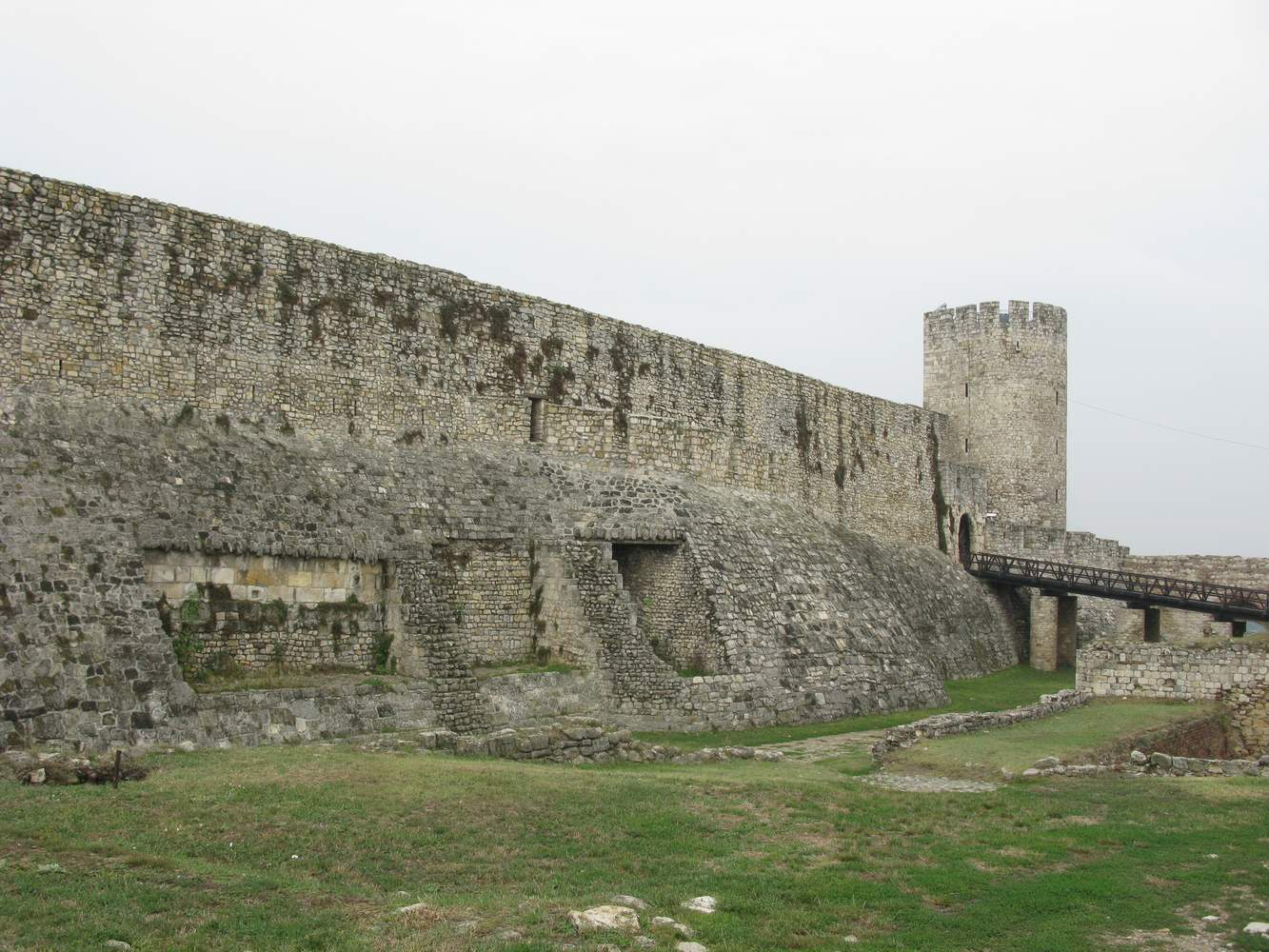
Remains of the Roman castrum in the older layers of the modern Belgrade Fortress

Later development of Belgrade destroyed over 80% of the cultural layer within the today protected zone of the Ancient Singidunum, that is, of the civilian settlement and necropolises. Only three sections were dug, conserved and reburied: Akademski Park, Park Proleće and Tadeuša Košćuškog Street. Of the remaining area, only a small part was explored. Northwest rampart with towers is explored to the higher degree, while the urban street grid and locations of soldier barracks can be deduced. In July 2016 city administration announced the complete reconstruction of Studentski Trg and construction of the underground garage. Construction of the two-level underground garage is criticized both by the public and experts, as the archaeological locality beneath the park has not been properly explored, historically or archaeologically, and now all the Roman and later Byzantine remains will be permanently destroyed. It was the first among the most important urban zones of old Belgrade and is especially important as the locality of ancient Singidunum which developed along the Terazije ridge. The area of the square was described as having the deepest "cultural and historical sedimentation" in the city and as the original source of the urban culture of Belgrade.

=== Downtown ===
During the digging of the foundations for the Monument to Prince Michael in 1882, tombs from different periods of Roman rule were discovered. One tomb was made from bricks, and there were 13 circular and 2 rectangle grave pits. Some of them are "well-tombs", named so because they are more than 10 m (33 ft) deep. The "well-tombs" are rare in these areas and it is believed that the custom arrived from Gaul. The brick tomb, which contained rushlight, was discovered close to the Čika Ljubina Street, while the other pits were where the monument is today. The materials found in the tombs include pottery fragments and vessels, pieces of terracotta and stone statues, fan-shaped floor tiles, bronze and bone needles, bricks, rushlights, etc. The pits were filled with ashes and contained animal bones. Coins and bronze rings, parts of the armor, have also been discovered. These "well-tombs" are considered to be the oldest part of the vast Singidunum necropolis, originating from c.100 AD, while the brick tomb is dated to c.400 and some of its bricks have a stamp of the Legio IV Flavia Felix. During the 2018-2019 renovation, two additional, devastated tombs were discovered.

The southwestern necropolis, dating from the 3rd century, was located in the modern neighborhoods of Zeleni Venac, Kosančićev Venac and Varoš Kapija. The remains were discovered during the construction works in the 1930s when the Brankova Street was extended to the Sava river, to make a connection to the future King Alexander Bridge. At 16 Brankova Street a Roman tomb was discovered in 1931, with ceramics and coins from the period of the emperors Aurelian and Claudius Gothicus. The grave was made from the reused parts of stele. The sandstone plaque had a niche with a human bust and an inscription naming Valerius Longinus as a builder of the memorial for his son, a veteran Valerius Maximinus. There was another tombstone, crushed into pieces, dedicated by Maximinus' wife. Several other well preserved graves were discovered in the direction of the Pop Lukina and Karađorđeva streets. Further discoveries in the area during the Interbellum include a golden polyhedron shaped earring from the early Middle Ages (Great Migration Period), found in Kamenička Street. When the foundations for the building of the Medical Association were dug, more than 4 kg of the Late Roman coins were discovered. They originated from the 5th century. Some remains were also discovered during the 2018 construction of the hotel at 20 Jug Bogdanova Street.

On the crossroad of the Gospodar Jevremova and Kneginje Ljubice streets, in Dorćol, a house of worship dedicated to the Greek goddess Hecate, a sort of "descent to Hades", was discovered in 1935. As foundations for a new building were being dug, a 1.5 m (4 ft 11 in) long architrave beam, with an inscription in Latin dedicated to Hecate, was discovered at the depth of 2.5 m (8 ft 2 in). The inscription was written by Valerius Crescentio, a legionary of the Legio IV Flavia Felix, in the service of the emperor Maximinus Thrax. It is roughly dated at c.235 AD. It disappeared after it was discovered, but was found decades later and handed over to the National Museum in Belgrade. It is one of the rare findings of Hecate in Serbia. Her cult wasn't developed in this area and she was mostly identified with the Roman goddess Diana, worshiped in the region as the protector of silver mines. The entire surrounding slope around the Gospodar Jevremova was a necropolis, so the temple was probably part of it, since Hecate's temples were usually built on the cemeteries. The beam ends in a step-like manner, so the temple was probably built in the Ionic order rather than the Tuscan order, which would be expected in Singidunum. Impressions of anta capital and their size on the lower side of the beam point to existing of two columns and a probable rectangular gable above it. There is a possibility, due to the terrain, that the temple was actually dug into the slope.

The original earthen and wooden fort stretched around the Studentski Trg and Knez Mihailova Street. The oldest Roman graves were discovered in this section, dated to the 1st and early 2nd century. In the Lower Town section of today's Fortress, remains from the 2nd and 3rd centuries were discovered. They include thermae, residential objects and a shrine dedicated to Mithras. The forum, which included the temples of Jupiter and Nemesis, was located close to the Cathedral Church, where the modern building of the National Bank of Serbia in the Kralja Petra Street is situated. Another thermae were located in the Čika Ljubina Street. The entire settlement was surrounded by vast necropolises, while the main and the largest one stretched along the Via Militaris in the direction of Viminacium, today's Bulevar Kralja Aleksandra where numerous graves, grave steles and sacrificial altars were discovered.

The northern section of the Academy Park, on Studentski Trg, was excavated in 1968 during the building of a furnace oil tank for the boiler room of the Belgrade's City Committee of the League of Communists located nearby. Under the lawn, the remnants of the ancient Roman thermae were discovered, including the frigidarium (room with the cold water), laconicum (room with the warm water where people would sweat and prepare) and caldarium (room with the two pools of hot water). The site became an archaeological dig in 1969 and 8 rooms in total were discovered, including the remains of the brick furnace which heated the water. It was a public unisex bath dated to 3rd or 4th century. The entire area of the park is actually within the borders of the "Protected zone of Roman Singidunum". It is situated in the area that used to be the civilian sector of the city, outside the fortress. The remnants were visible until 1978 and due to the lack of funds to continue excavations or to cover it with the roof or a marquee, the remains were conserved and buried again. Remains of another thermae on the nearby Faculty of Philosophy Plateau are still visible and used as benches.

In 2004 digging for the future shopping mall in Rajićeva Street began, next to the Knez Mihailova. Remains of the antique and late antique layers were discovered, so as the remains of the southwest rampart route and double trench in the direction of Kralja Petra. The trench from the 3rd century was buried and full of coins, lamps, ceramics and jars. Next to this locality, at the corner of Knez Mihailova and Kralja Petra, an area paved with the cobblestone dating from the 2nd century was discovered. It was a public space right before the entrance into the fortress.

During almost every construction downtown where digging is involved, more remains are being discovered. In 2007, on the location of the former kafana Tri lista duvana at the corner of Bulevar Kralja Aleksandra and Kneza Miloša street, several necropolises were found. Just across, in Pioneers Park, there is Archaeological Site Pionirski Park. When the underground garage was dug, 19 tombs were discovered. In 2008 in Čika Ljubina Street remains of the house from the 4th century was discovered, which included the part of the floor and doorstep of the main entry door. Part of the walls was decorated with frescoes. Similar findings are discovered in the streets of Kosančićev Venac and Tadeuša Košćuškog. Also in 2008 remains from the late Antiquity were found, while at the corner of Takovska and Kosovska streets. Roman tombs were discovered. Remnants of the Roman castrum from the 2nd century were discovered beneath Tadeuša Košćuškog during the reconstruction in June 2009, they were conserved and reburied. In Cincar Jankova Street, five graves from the late 1st century were discovered so as three canals. Archaeologists expected to find a southeastern route of the castrum ramparts, but due to the mass wasting in the area and the leveling of the terrain, the route was destroyed in time. Remnants discovered in Kosančićev Venac are actually remains of the luxurious villa, with the floor mosaic and walls decorated in frescoes.

=== Outer neighborhoods ===
Pre-Roman artifacts, from the Late Iron Age, have been discovered in the modern neighborhoods and suburbs of Karaburma, Zemun, Batajnica and Ritopek. The Scythian styled pendant from the 5th century BC have been discovered in Ritopek, a representation of a stylized griffin's head with tentacles.

Remains were found near Karaburma and Rospi Ćuprija, including necropolis (Horseman's grave 16), rich in artefacts and parts of dunum.

== See also ==
- Archaeological Site Pionirski Park

== Sources ==
Books

- Curta, Florin (2001). The Making of the Slavs: History and Archaeology of the Lower Danube Region, c. 500–700. Cambridge: Cambridge University Press. ISBN 9781139428880.
- Curta, Florin (2006). Southeastern Europe in the Middle Ages, 500–1250. Cambridge: Cambridge University Press. ISBN 9780521815390.
- Given, John (2014). The Fragmentary History of Priscus. Merchantville, New Jersey: Evolution Publishing. ISBN 9781935228141.
- Levick, Barbara (1999). Vespasian. Routledge. ISBN 978-0415338660.
- Mócsy, András (2014) [1974]. Pannonia and Upper Moesia: A History of the Middle Danube Provinces of the Roman Empire. New York: Routledge. ISBN 9781317754251.
- Taylor, William Cooke (1878). A manual of ancient and modern history. D. Appleton & Co.
- Todorović, Jovan (1974). Skordisci: istorija i kultura. Institut za izučavanje istorije Vojvodine.
- Whitby, Michael (1988). The Emperor Maurice and his Historian: Theophylact Simocatta on Persian and Balkan warfare. Oxford: Clarendon Press. ISBN 9780198229452.

Encyclopedias

- Kazhdan, Alexander (1991). "Singidunum". The Oxford Dictionary of Byzantium. Vol. 3. New York: Oxford University Press. p. 1904. ISBN 9780195046526.
- Milan Mišić, ed. (2005). Енциклопедија Британика - сажето издање, књига 1, А-Б [Britannica pocked encyclopaedia, Vol. 1, A-B]. Narodna Knjiga, Politika. p. 131. ISBN 86-331-2075-5.
- Milan Mišić, ed. (2005). Енциклопедија Британика - сажето издање, књига 8, С [Britannica pocked encyclopaedia, Vol. 8, S]. Narodna Knjiga, Politika. p. 86. ISBN 86-331-2119-0.
- Radivoje Mikić, ed. (2006). Српска породична енциклопедија, књига 3, Ба-Би [Serbian family encynclopedia, Vol. 3, Ba-Bi]. Narodna Knjiga, Politika. p. 116. ISBN 86-331-2732-6.
- Borislav Blagojević, ed. (1986). Мала енциклопедија Просвета, 4. иѕдање, књига 1, А-Ј [Little encyclopedia Prosveta, 4th edition, Vol. 1, A-J]. Prosveta, Belgrade. p. 227. ISBN 86-07-00001-2.
- Srboljub Stanković (2008). Radoš Ljušić (ed.). Енциклопедија српског народа [Encyclopedia of Serbian people]. Zavod za udžbenike, Belgrade. p. 89. ISBN 978-86-17-15732-4.
- Miroslav Vujović (2008). Radoš Ljušić (ed.). Енциклопедија српског народа [Encyclopedia of Serbian people]. Zavod za udžbenike, Belgrade. p. 1006. ISBN 978-86-17-15732-4.
- Marko Popović (2011). Dragan Stanić (ed.). Српска енциклопедија, том 1, књига 2, Београд-Буштрање [Serbian Encyclopedia, Vol. I, Book 2, Beograd-Buštranje]. Matica Srpska, Serbian Academy of Sciences and Arts, Zavod za udžbenike, Novi Sad-Belgrade. p. 37. ISBN 978-86-7946-097-4.

Journals

- Janković, Đorđe (2004). "The Slavs in the 6th Century North Illyricum". Гласник Српског археолошког друштва. 20: 39–61.
- Marija Brakočević (16 June 2009). "Beograd na ostacima Rimskog carstva" [Belgrade on the remains of the Roman Empire]. Politika (in Serbian). pp. 01 & 09.
- Marija Brakočević & Dejan Aleksić (21 February 2016). "Bulevar kralja Aleksandra – moderna avenija sa šarmom prošlosti" [King Alexander Boulevard - a modern avenue with the charm of the past]. Politika (in Serbian).
- Zoran Nikolić (7 October 2002). "Enigma ispod Taša" [Enigma below the Taš]. Večernje Novosti (in Serbian).
- Branka Jakšić (24 September 2017). "Pogled s neba i podzemne avanture" [View from the sky and underground adventures]. Politika (in Serbian).
- Nikola Bilić (30 October 2011). "Putovanje kroz istoriju beogradskim metroom" [Journey through history by Belgrade subway]. Politika (in Serbian).
- Daliborka Mučibabić (4 January 2017). "Pešačko carstvo od trideset leta" [Pedestrian empire of 30 years]. Politika (in Serbian).
- Tanjug (15 April 2017). "Ada Huja postaje izletište i stambeno-komercijalna zona" [Ada Huja becomes an excursion site and a residential-commercial zone]. Politika (in Serbian).
- Aleksandar Todorović (30 October 2017a). "Avala krije svoje tajne" [Avala is hiding its secrets]. Politika (in Serbian). p. 32.
- Milan Janković (30 May 2011). "Voda kulja iz kosmajskih rudnika" [Water pouring from the Kosmaj mines]. Politika (in Serbian). p. 32.
- "Otkriveno rimsko nalazište u Zemun-polju" [Roman find in Zemun-Polje discovered]. Politika (in Serbian). 9 September 1963.
- Aleksandra Mijalković (13 August 2017). "Vlastelinska grobnica u Brestoviku" [Nobleman's tomb in Brestovik]. Politika-Magazin, No. 1037 (in Serbian). pp. 25–27.
- Zorica Atić (26 August 2017). "Misteriozni kamenovi iz Brestovika" [Mysterious stones from Brestovik]. Politika (in Serbian). p. 13.
- Miroljub Kojović (30 October 2017b). "Istoriju Singidunuma prepuštamo zaboravu" [We leave he history of Singidunum to the oblivion]. Politika (in Serbian).
- Borislav Stojkov (4 November 2017). "Da li se građani za nešto pitaju" [Are citizens being asked about anything?]. Politika-Kulturni dodatak (in Serbian). p. 07.
- Branka Vasiljević (14 November 2011). "Počinje uređenje Akademskog parka" [Arrangement of Academy Park begins]. Politika (in Serbian).
- Branka Vasiljević (27 May 2009). "Rimske terme ispod Akademskog parka" [Roman thermae beneath Academy Park]. Politika (in Serbian).
- Branka Vasiljević (15 January 2018). "Hekatino svetilište, mesto silaska u Had" [Hecate place of worship, a place for descending in the Hades]. Politika (in Serbian). p. 15.
- "Да ли знате: по коме је Београд добио своје прво име Сингидунум?" [Did you know: who gave Belgrade its first name Singidunum?]. Politika (in Serbian). 18 May 2018. p. 30.
- Branka Vasiljević (interview with archaeologist Rade Milić) (21 July 2018). "Rimske nekropole oko Zelenog venca" [Roman necropolises around Zeleni Venac]. Politika (in Serbian). p. 12.
- Branka Vasiljević (6 November 2018). "Jedinstveni grobovi bunari s kraja prvog veka" [Unique well-graves from the end of the first century]. Politika (in Serbian). p. 13.
- Ana Vuković (8 November 2018). "Tragom Skordiska u našem gradu" [Trails of the Scordisci in our city]. Politika (in Serbian). p. 15.

Web

- "Planina Avala: srednjovekovni utvrđeni grad Žrnov, zvan i Žrnovan, branik Beograda" [Avala Mountain: medieval fortified town of Žrnov, also called Žrnovan, defender of Belgrade].
- "Pektoral" [Pectoral (shield)]. Virtuelni muzej Dunava. 2012. Archived from the original on 31 December 2019.
- "Ovako će izgledati Studentski trg" [This is how Studentski Trg will look like] (in Serbian). B92. 13 July 2016.
- "The Society of the living – the Community of the dead (from Neolithic to the Christian Era)". University "Lucian Blaga", Sibiu, Romania.
- "Discover Belgrade - Ancient period" (in Serbian). City of Belgrade. 2018.
- "Jovijanova ulica, Beograd". Google Maps. 2018.
