= Roman tomb, Brestovik =

Coordinates: 44.644113°N 20.760604°E

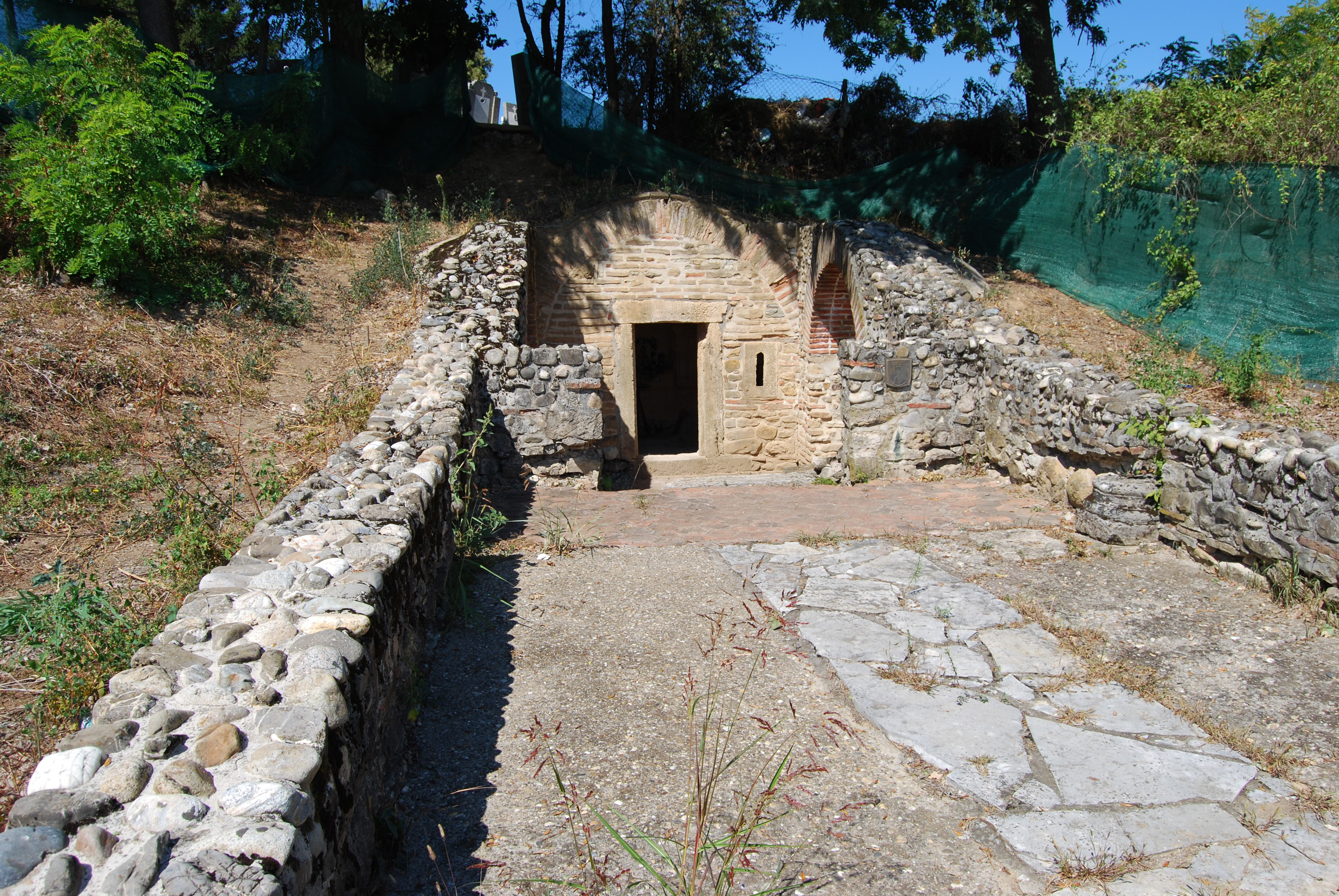
Roman tomb in Brestovik

Roman tomb in Brestovik (Serbian: Римска гробница у Брестовику, romanized: Rimska grobnica u Brestoviku) is an ancient tomb, dating from c. 300, which was discovered in 1895 in Brestovik, today a suburban village of Belgrade, the capital of Serbia. Though evidence points to the tomb of a wealthy local, popular belief is that the "martyrs of Singidunum", Hermylus and Stratonicus, were buried inside. As one of the most important monuments from the Roman period, the tomb is protected since 1948.

== Location ==
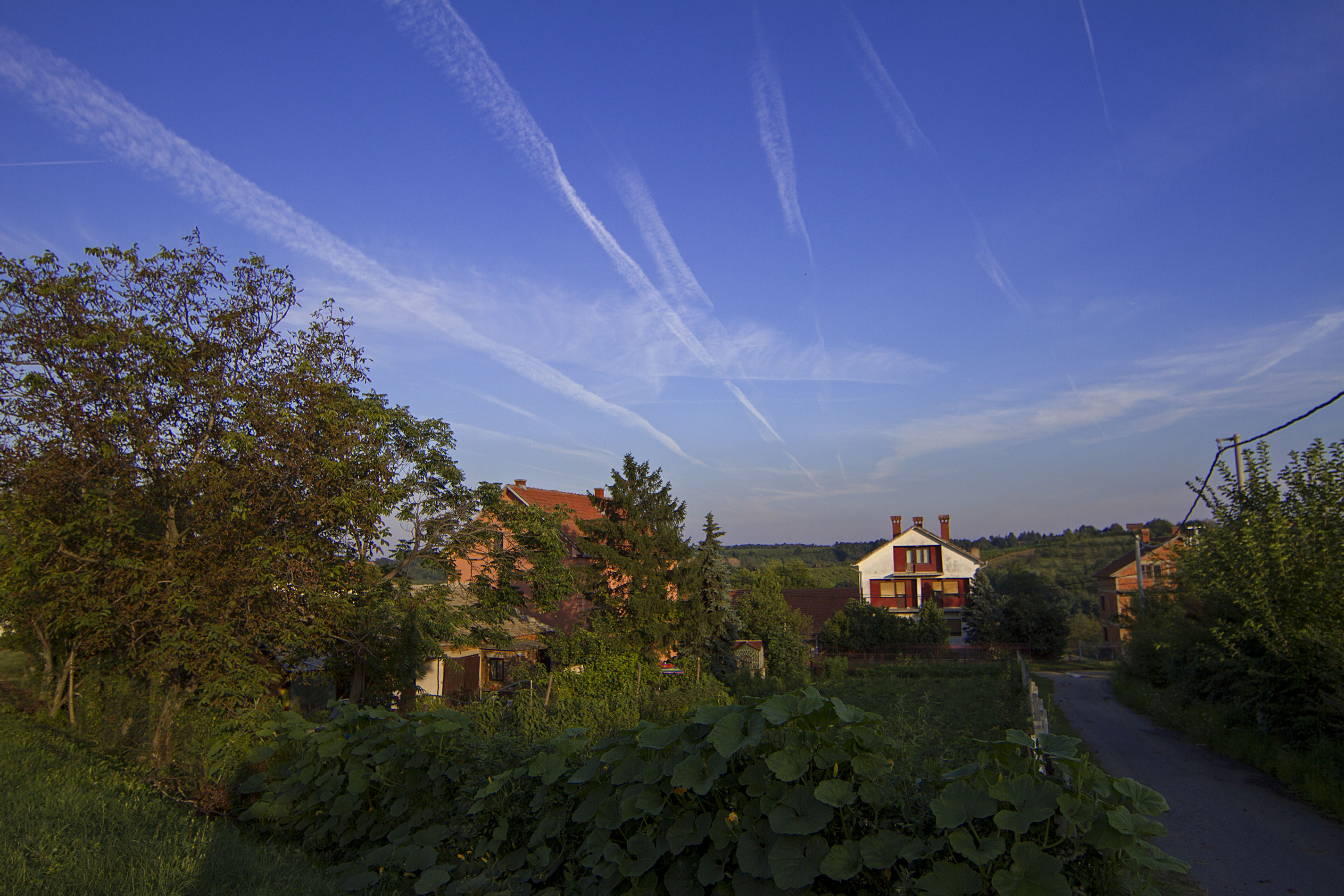
Village of Brestovik

The tomb is situated in the village of Brestovik in Belgrade's municipality of Grocka, on the locality of Vukašinova crkva. It is dug into the hill of Zlatno brdo ("Golden hill").

== Discovery and explorations ==
The tomb was discovered by accident in 1895. The owner of the lot, Vukašin Milosavljević, was planting seedlings in his plum orchard, when he hit the arch of the vault with his spade. He notified the authorities and in September 1895 Mihailo Valtrović, the curator of the National Museum in Belgrade and founder of the archaeology in Serbia, was dispatched to the site. He conducted the excavations and uncovered the entire tomb. It was conserved and protected in 1905, while the excavations have been done in 1955 and 1964. In 1964 the tomb was opened for visitors and a stone stairway was built to make the site more accessible.

== Characteristics ==
The structure was built in the late 3rd or an early 4th century. It is partially dug into the slope of the hill on which the modern village cemetery is today. The tomb is oriented in the east-west direction with the entrance being on the eastern side. It is approached by an elongated, 4-metre-long (13 ft) entry section, which is cut into the slope. The tomb was built from crushed stone, river pebble and bricks, all connected with the Roman lime plaster made with volcanic sand, and itself consists of three rooms:

- porch; separated by the entry section by four pillars, it was paved with the six-sided bricks. It is connected with the central room by the door and stairs, as the porch is 1 m (3 ft 3 in) higher.
- central room; it has two side apsides, on the north and south, and was also paved with the six-sided bricks. The walls were covered with frescoes, which faded completely. The room was also ornamented with the marble statues and two figures of lions lying down. Two sculptures represented death geniuses (in the form of boys mourning the deceased) and at least one was of a sad Cupid, a winged boy sitting on a pedestal, while the lyons "guarded" the burial chamber. In one of the apsides was the life-sized sculpture of the Roman soldier (lacking the head) and a bust in Roman military clothing, which points that he was either a military commander or a high ranked clerk who was awarded with an estate. It is suggested that the room was used for sacrificial gifts to the departed. It is separated from the burial chamber by the massive wooden door and two windows.
- burial chamber; it is rectangular, with the half-domed brick arch. It was also covered with frescoes which are, unlike the central room, still visible today in the chamber's inner section. They are best preserved on the walls and the ceiling. The frescoes represent a different geometry motifs, combined with the plants and animals in different colors: ochre, cinnabar, blue, green, brown and red. The southern and northern walls have the motifs of fishes and waterfowls while the west has partially recognizable human figures, probably the likes of the buried ones. The chamber contained three built sarcophagi. Part of the arch was collapsed, but was restored later, as were some of the frescoes.

The porch and the central room are partially visible from above the ground, while the chamber is completely embedded into the hill. Later excavations in 1955 showed that the complex wasn't built at the same time. The burial chamber is the oldest while the rest was built later. Today, all the rooms are empty as sarcophagi and sculptures were taken away - some looted long time ago and some disappeared after the tomb was discovered.

It is the first discovered ancient multi-chambered tomb in Belgrade. Characteristics point to the Roman (pagan) sepulchral structure, which probably belonged to the wealthy family which had an estate and a villa in the vicinity, probably of a noble or a military commander. The disposition of the edifice and parts of the sculptures show the connection with the pagan heroons and shrines of the Imperial cult. Considering the tomb's elements and their relations, it marks the link between the Antiquity and early Christian buildings, a progenitor type from which the complex Christian structures of the burial cult developed. Within its period, it shows the connections with other Late Roman monuments, up to 6th century, on the territory of Serbia, but also much wider, on the Balkans and the Middle East. Closest analogy can be found with certain tombs discovered in Syria.

== Protection and reconstruction ==
Valtrović described it as one of the "most precious monuments from the Antiquity, not only in Belgrade, but in Serbia". It was protected on 12 February 1948 as the cultural monument of great importance by the Institute for protection of the monuments (Decision No. 200/48), and was declared a cultural heritage of great importance by the state in 1979 (Službeni glasnik Socijalističke Republike Srbije, No. 14/79).

Partial conservation was done in 1964. Since 2016, the Institute was drafting the project of repairing the tomb from the moist damage and conservation of the frescoes in the burial chamber. A joint project of several institutions for the conservation and restoration was finished in January 2020. Plans were also made to nominate it to be a part of the interstate protected area of the Limes of the Roman Empire, in its Danube section in Serbia (also including Belgrade Fortress, Viminacium, etc.). In terms of construction itself, the tomb is in relatively good shape, but the main problem is the moist which highly endangered the fresco paintings, with painted plaster falling off. As the access path is passing through the privately owned lot, it will be relocated, with the usual additional objects (new gate, road and tourist signs, benches, greenery around the tomb, etc.).

== Saint Hermylus and Stratonicus ==
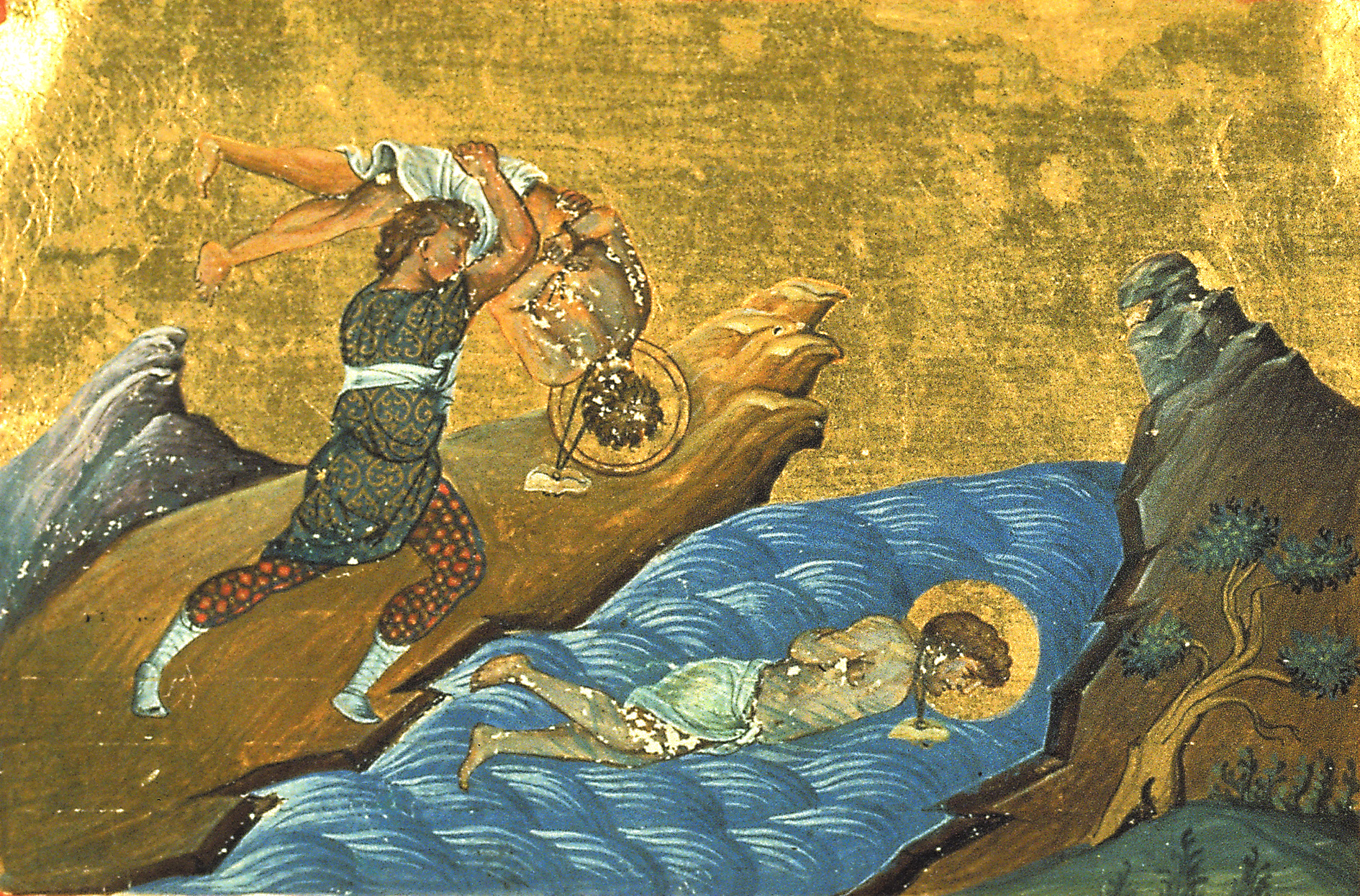
Depiction of the drowning of Hermylus and Stratonicus in the Menologion of Basil II

Roman emperors Constantine I the Great and Licinius signed the Edict of Milan in 313 which made Christianity one of the official religions in the Roman Empire. Licinius, who ruled in the east, soon clashed with Constantine so he outlawed the Christians again. According to the church hagiography from the 5th century, Hermylus, a Christian, was imprisoned and managed to convert one of his guards, Stratonicus. Licinius ordered for both of them to be tortured and drowned, so in the end they were put in one coffin and, still alive, thrown below the Singidunum Fortress at the Sava's mouth into the Danube, in 314 or 315. The coffin was stranded on the shore 18 stadia downstream, allegedly near modern Brestovik. Local Christians buried them in the brick tomb embedded into the hill. They were canonized by the Serbian Orthodox Church and their feast day is 26 January.

This prompted clerics and theologians to conclude that the Roman tomb in Brestovik is actually a tomb of Hermylus and Stratonicus. Experts didn't find anything that would point to the Christian tomb. Furthermore, one of two discovered sarcophagi in 1895 was a "female" one, and it was apparently a family tomb for a man, woman and a child. In addition, Brestovik is much further from Belgrade than 18 stadia (c. 3.5 km (2.2 mi)).

Despite protests from the experts, institutions and the owners of the lot, local clergy and worshipers entered the tomb in 2014, bringing icons, candles and flowers, and holding services, which partially damaged the monument. As the tomb leans on modern cemetery, the church offered to the owners to buy the lot from them so that an entrance directly though the graveyard could be built, but they refused. Supported by several professors from the Faculty of Theology, the church considers the tomb an "early Christian church", that third, unknown person, was also buried with two saints, and that local population removed the remains from the sarcophagi so that advancing Huns or Avars wouldn't desecrate the tomb.

In 2016 local clergy started an initiative to build a church over the tomb. Serbian Orthodox Church again tried to buy the property from the current owners who again refused and the Institute for the protection of cultural monuments stated that the tomb is under protection and that nothing can't be built over it, regardless of the ownership, unless the Institute allows it. Church archaeologists claim that the saints were originally hastily buried in the Grocka's region of Dubočaj, a bit to the west, and then were reinterred to the new tomb in Brestovik when it was built. They claim that existence of the windows in the chamber prove that it was a room with relics and that one of the faint fresco figures is actually a Virgin Mary with Jesus, with two halos. Archaeologists disputed all this, saying that the image of Virgin Mary with Jesus was not yet used in that period and that absolutely everything discovered in the tomb shows that it is a "classical mausoleum of the high positioned member of an aristocratic family, [probably] an official or employee in the administration of Singidunum". The municipality of Grocka granted the permit to the Serbian Orthodox Church to build a church in Brestovik, but not on the location of the tomb as they can't do it without the Institute's permission.

However, there are many stories among the local population about other tombs, still undiscovered, embedded into the hills, but no archaeological works have been done other than this locality. The entire area is actually a possible archaeological site with numerous embedded tombs. Only this one was preserved, which doesn't exclude the possibility that there are other, undiscovered ones.
