= Grocka =

Grocka Гроцка (Serbian)
- Municipality
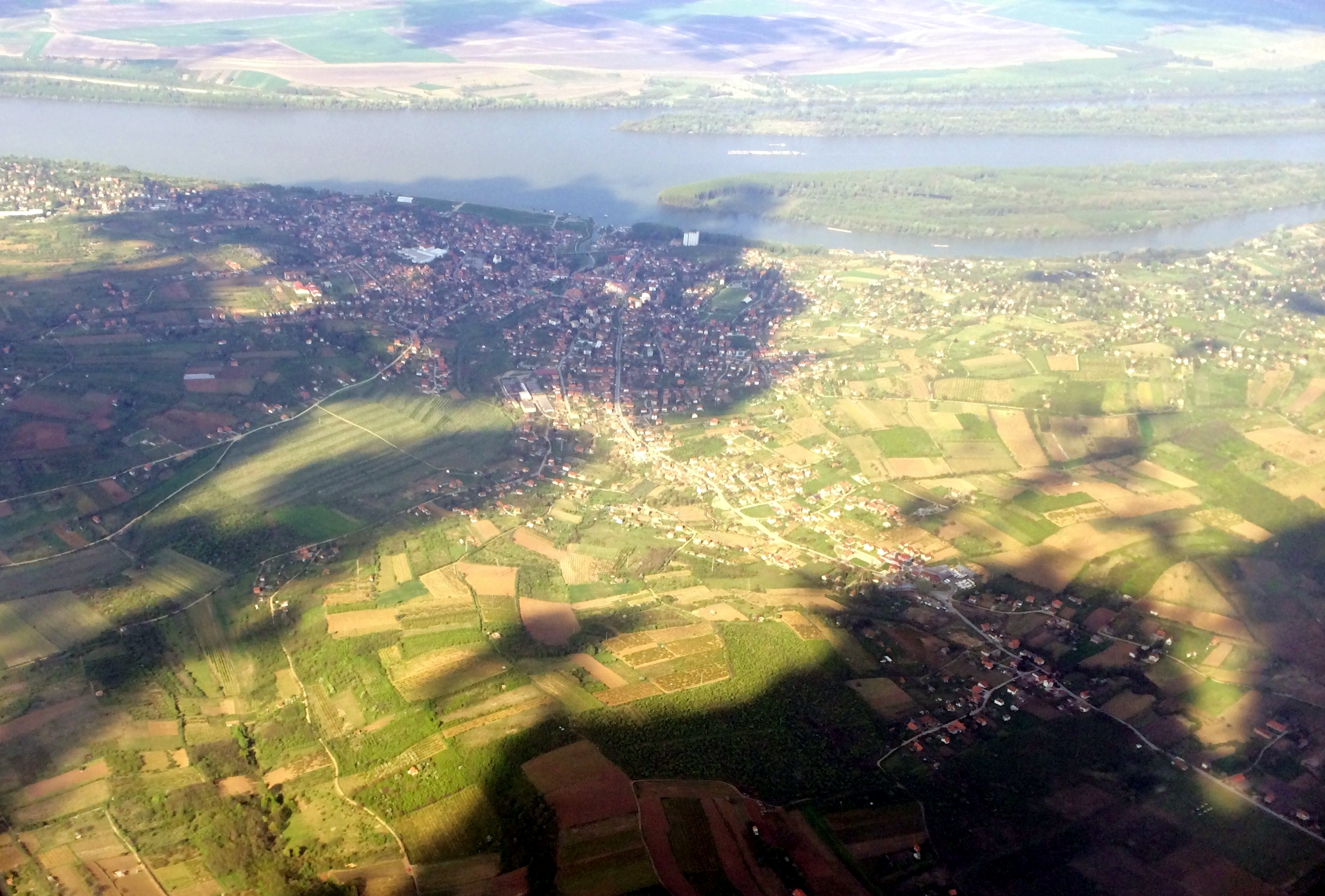
- Aerial view

- Coat of arms

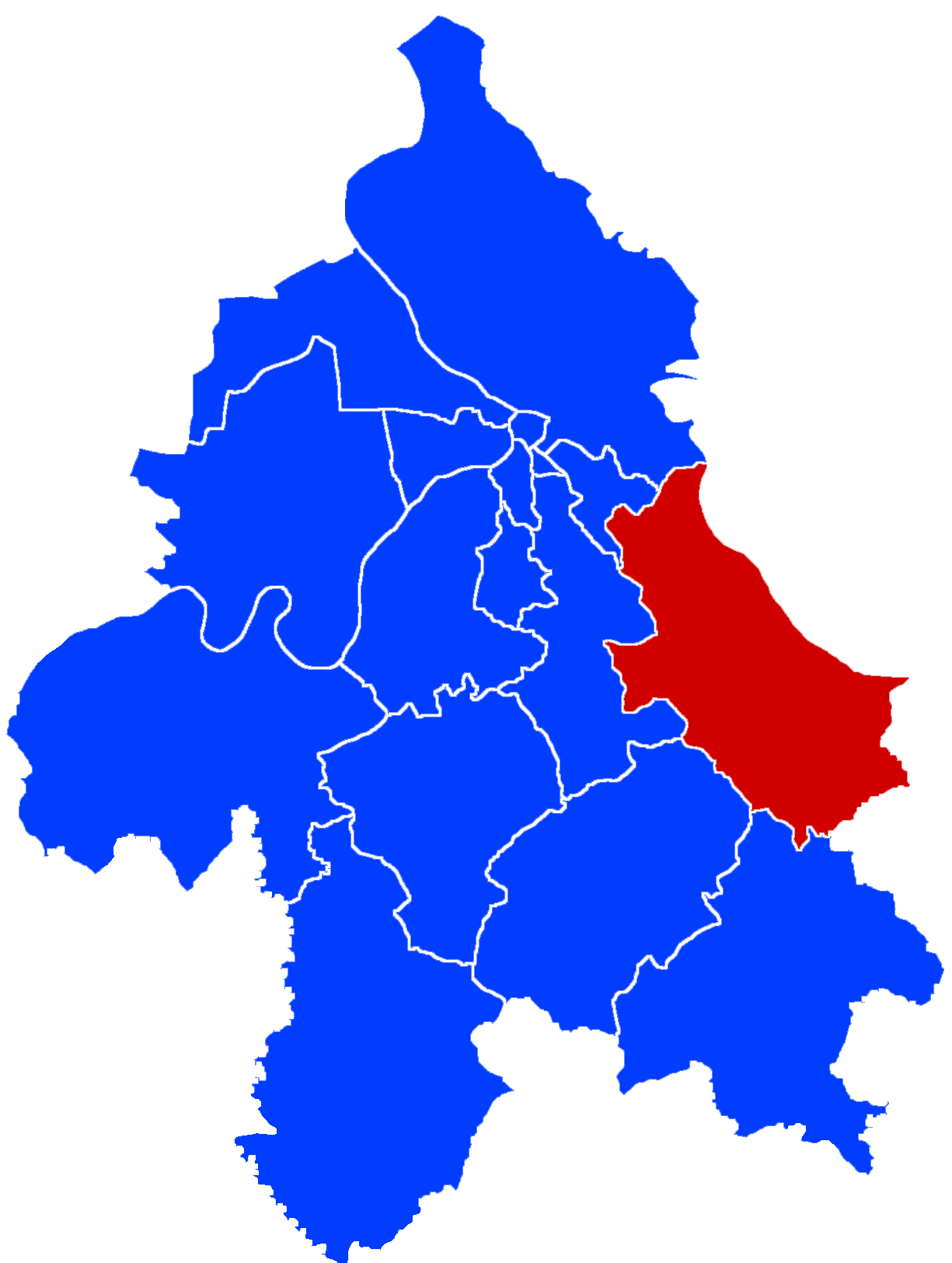
- Location of Grocka within the city of Belgrade
- Coordinates: 44°40′N 20°43′E
- Country: Serbia
- City: Belgrade
- Settlements: 15

Government
  - Type: Municipality of Belgrade
  - Municipality president: Saša Čaprić (SNS)

Area
  - Urban: 30.70 km^{2} (11.85 sq mi)
  - Municipality: 299.52 km^{2} (115.65 sq mi)

Population (2022 census)
  - Town: 8,154
  - Municipality: 82,810
- Time zone: UTC+1 (CET)
  - Summer (DST): UTC+2 (CEST)
- Postal code: 11306
- Area code: +381 011
- Car plates: BG
- Website: www.grocka.rs

Grocka (Serbian Cyrillic: Гроцка, pronounced [ɡrǒtskaː]) or Grocka na Dunavu (Serbian Cyrillic: Гроцка на Дунаву, lit. 'Grocka on Danube') is a municipality of the city of Belgrade. According to the 2022 census results, the municipality has 82,810 inhabitants.

== Location and geography ==
The municipality is located east of Belgrade, in the northern part of Šumadija region, with the northern section being part of the Podunavlje macro-region in the valley of the Danube, while the southern section is located around the valley of the Ralja River, which is a tributary to the Velika Morava's arm of Jezava. With an altitude of 71 meters above sea level, the town of Grocka is one of the lowest parts of Belgrade. Other rivers in the municipality are Bolečica and Gročica. Being polluted, by 2019 the environmentalists described both rivers as "less of a watercourses, more of a sewage watersheds".

== History ==
During the late Ottoman period, there existed the Belgrade nahiya and Grocka nahiya. The Belgrade nahiya included the knežine (Serb self-governing village groups) of Posavina and Kolubara, while the Grocka nahiya included the knežine of Podunavlje and Kosmaj. They were all united into a single Belgrade nahiya which became the Belgrade okrug with the Gročanski srez (srez of Grocka) and Vračarski srez (srez of Vračar).

The municipality of Grocka became part of the wider Belgrade City area in 1955. In 1957 with the dissolution of the Mali Mokri Lug municipality, the eastern section (the villages of Kaluđerica, Leštane and Vinča) were attached to Grocka. In the early 1960s, the municipalities of Umčari and Vrčin were disbanded and incorporated into the municipality of Grocka as well.

== Settlements ==
The municipality of Grocka covers an area of 289 km^{2} and includes 15 settlements, all of which are statistically classified as rural, except for the municipal seat of Grocka, which is urban. The small town of Grocka is located on the right bank of the Danube, where the small river Gročica empties into the Danube, 30 km east of Belgrade. Despite being the seat of the municipality, in terms of population, it is only the fourth largest settlement in the municipality, after Kaluđerica, Vrčin and Leštane.

- Begaljica
- Boleč
- Brestovik
- Dražanj
- Grocka
- Kaluđerica
- Kamendol
- Leštane
- Pudarci
- Ritopek
- Umčari
- Vinča
- Vrčin
- Zaklopača
- Živkovac

Neighborhoods of Vrčin:

- Adamovići
- Bajića Kraj
- Carino Naselje
- Cerje
- Donja Mala
- Gornja Mala
- Jankovići
- Malo Polje
- Pobrđani
- Ramnice
- Tranšped
- Karagača
- Kasapovac

== Demographics ==
Historical population
| Year | Pop. | ±% p.a. |
|---|---|---|
| 1948 | 28,927 | — |
| 1953 | 30,659 | +1.17% |
| 1961 | 32,836 | +0.86% |
| 1971 | 35,275 | +0.72% |
| 1981 | 54,599 | +4.47% |
| 1991 | 69,448 | +2.43% |
| 2002 | 75,466 | +0.76% |
| 2011 | 83,907 | +1.19% |
| 2022 | 82,810 | −0.12% |

According to the 2022 census results, the municipality has a population of 82,810 inhabitants. Due to immigration and the natural increase of all of the city's municipalities, Grocka has been for decades one of the fastest growing areas of Belgrade. The population boomed in the last 50 years, increasing the number of inhabitants (1971–2022 by 2.35 times). As in other similar areas surrounding Belgrade, the rapid population growth has not been followed by the equal development of infrastructure (roads, waterworks, sewage system, and waste disposal).

=== Ethnic groups ===
The ethnic composition of the municipality:

| Ethnic group | Population | Percent |
|---|---|---|
| Serbs | 75,735 | 91.46% |
| Romani | 751 | 0.91% |
| Gorani | 394 | 0.48% |
| Macedonians | 275 | 0.33% |
| Bulgarians | 130 | 0.16% |
| Muslims | 120 | 0.14% |
| Yugoslavs | 120 | 0.14% |
| Croats | 88 | 0.11% |
| Montenegrins | 85 | 0.1% |
| Russians | 84 | 0.1% |
| Bosniaks | 72 | 0.09% |
| Vlachs | 46 | 0.06% |
| Romanians | 40 | 0.05% |
| Hungarians | 35 | 0.04% |
| Slovaks | 20 | 0.02% |
| Albanians | 18 | 0.02% |
| Ukrainians | 13 | 0.02% |
| Others | 185 | 0.22% |
| Undeclared/Unknown | 4,599 | 5.55% |
| Total | 82,810 | |

== Economy ==
In both demographic and economic terms, the municipality is sharply divided into two opposing parts. The western part extends into one urban area with Belgrade, experiencing a boost of both population and economy, as hundreds of small companies are located there (Kaluđerica, Boleč, Leštane, Vinča, Ritopek are some), while the eastern part is agricultural, in particular a fruit growing area, and, apart from the town of Grocka itself, experiencing a net decline in population.

The microclimate is perfect for fruit growing and grapevines. The area east of Boleč is one of the best known fruit growing areas in Serbia. Fruit growing developed in the late 19th century and Grocka, Boleč, Ritopek, Zaklopača, Begaljica and Brestovik became known as the "Serbian California" or "Little California", producing apples, peaches, apricots, plums, and grapes. Ritopek became a major producer of cherries. Production reduced since the 2000s but the capacity of the orchards is 65,000 tons of fruit per year. In 2017 orchards spread over the area of 70 km^{2} (27 sq mi), or almost a quarter of the municipal total area, reaching 74.93 km^{2} (28.93 sq mi) by 2020.

Grocka is also known as the "Serbian cherry capital" as the cherry survived as the major crop. Cultivation was introduced by Jovan J. Jovanović, gynecologist of queen Draga and pioneer of reproductive health in Serbia. Jovanović noticed vast orchards and organized fruit production during his studying in Austria-Hungary. Austrian experts surveyed the land, which Jovanović wanted to be close to Belgrade, as the largest market in the state. Taking in account soil structure and climate, they suggested slopes above the Danube in Grocka. He purchased the land in 1906 from the Grocka municipality which was in debts due to the renovation of the Holy Trinity church. The municipality decided to sell numerous parcels, remnants of the former Turkish estates. Jovanović outbid one of the wealthiest Grocka families, the Bećagović. The lots were located in the localities of Rupe and Kozjak, at the entrance into Grocka. From 1906 to 1908 he planted 7,000 trees on 80 ha (200 acres), forming the largest ever cherry plantation in the Balkans.

Prior to that, cherry was cultivated only in some individual yards in the Grocka area, and this was beginning of the plantation-type fruit production in Serbia in general. Jovanović introduced varieties like hedelfingen, germersdorf and early Lyonnaise, but the names were hard to pronounce for the local farmers so they gave them Serbian names which survived, herc (heart shaped), kerminka (red juice) and doktorka (doctor's cherry), after Jovanović, respectively. Local farmers accepted cherry cautiously at first, planting the trees on the arable lots edges, to make shade. Then they planted it jointly with the grapevine but by the 1920s the cherry began to squeeze out other crops and the formation of the cherry nurseries began. From Grocka, cultivation spread to the nearby Ritopek which is today the major production center. After World War II, the new Communist authorities nationalized Jovanović's land, divided it and awarded the lots to the landless. However, few years later the state nationalized the land again, with one part being re-parceled and sold, while the "PIK Grocka", agricultural farm was formed on the other. By the 1950s, the production in Grocka outgrew demand of Belgrade farmers markets and the export began. On the sold parcels, the weekend-settlement developed. Still, the fruit-growing remains the vastly predominant agricultural branch. Out of all registered agricultural farms and economies, 90%, or some 3,000, are producing fruits.

Unlike cherry, which is fairly recent in the region, the grapevine has been cultivated since the Roman period. The hilly slopes above the Danube, with excellent climate for the grapes, extend from Grocka to Smederevo. In the early modern and modern period, if a landowner or a farmer wanted to be considered successful and distinguished, he had to own his own vineyard. The cluster of white grapes is represented on Grocka's coat of arms. Belgrade and Vienna are the only two European capitals which have grapevines and vineyards with geographical indication on their territories. Those vineyards are organic - the grapevines are treated minimally (with bluestone, without pesticides, herbicides, fungicides or artificial fertilizers), the land is not being plowed or disc harrowed, instead only the organic compost is being poured between the vines. Around and inside the vineyards various medicinal herbs and even weeds, are planted. The certified organic wine is made from the grapes cultivated at the Plavinci locality.

Of the other agricultural products, wheat is the most important. The experimental farm of Radmilovac is located near Vinča, as a section of the University of Belgrade Faculty of Agriculture. Radmilovac is being expanded as an experimental ground for future agricultural production.

As a result of this, industrial processing of the fruit is developed in Grocka, Vinča and Boleč, where the large plantations and refrigeration plants of the agricultural company PKB Beograd are located. Also, several mills are located in Grocka and Vinča.

The textile industry is also important (Grocka, Dunav factory, aka:Partizanka), while hundreds of small family-owned factories and workshops are located in the settlements in the western part of the municipality.

Some major traffic routes, like the "Smederevski put" ("Smederevo road") and both the Belgrade-Niš railway and highway, pass through the municipal territory. Also, there are several docks on the Danube (Vinča, Grocka) with the prospect of a future marina to be built in Grocka in the next few years.

Other important facilities in the municipality are the Geomagnetic observatory in Brestovik, the Nuclear Institute (with a defunct nuclear reactor) and the Belgrade City landfill in Vinča.

Tourism is the most developed part of the municipal economy. Almost every village has its own summer festival (like "Zlatni kotlić" ("Golden Cauldron") in Grocka or Dani trešnje (Days of the cherry) in Ritopek. The women's monastery of Rajinovac in Begaljica, the possible marina and aqua park in Grocka and the archaeological find of Vinča culture are potential opportunities to boost the tourist economy.

The game hunting grounds of Gavranski Potok ("Raven's Creek") are in the municipality.

One of the main characteristics of Grocka are weekend-settlements, mostly built by the inhabitants of Belgrade. Booming in the 1970s and 1980s, the building of weekend-houses largely stopped in the 1990s. In the 1980s, having a weekend-house in Grocka was a matter of prestige. It is estimated that there are 4,000 such houses in the municipality in several settlements. The largest settlements are Rujište on the slope above the Danube in Grocka itself with 200 houses and Ritopek with 300. The weekend-settlement of Čair, at the entrance into Grocka, is developing into a regular neighborhood.

The following table gives a preview of total number of registered people employed in legal entities per their core activity (as of 2022):

| Activity | Total |
|---|---|
| Agriculture, forestry and fishing | 26 |
| Mining and quarrying | 44 |
| Manufacturing | 3,111 |
| Electricity, gas, steam and air conditioning supply | 73 |
| Water supply; sewerage, waste management and remediation activities | 344 |
| Construction | 1,560 |
| Wholesale and retail trade, repair of motor vehicles and motorcycles | 3,848 |
| Transportation and storage | 1,121 |
| Accommodation and food services | 464 |
| Information and communication | 290 |
| Financial and insurance activities | 60 |
| Real estate activities | 15 |
| Professional, scientific and technical activities | 1,491 |
| Administrative and support service activities | 277 |
| Public administration and defense; compulsory social security | 569 |
| Education | 976 |
| Human health and social work activities | 881 |
| Arts, entertainment and recreation | 145 |
| Other service activities | 349 |
| Individual agricultural workers | 475 |
| Total | 16,120 |

== Politics ==
Since the elections in 2000, Grocka became the most politically turbulent of all Belgrade municipalities. Recent Presidents of the Municipality:

- 1992 - 1995 - Bogoljub Stevanić (1943)
- 1995 - November 24, 2000 - Milan Janković (1954)
- November 24, 2000 - June 28, 2002 - Vesna R. Ivić (1962)
- June 28, 2002 - December 8, 2002 - Milan Tanasković
- December 8, 2002 - April 15, 2003 - Sava Starčević (1955)
- April 15, 2003 - December 15, 2004 - Vladan Zarić (1972)
- December 15, 2004 - June 23, 2005 - Blažo Stojanović
- June 23, 2005 - November 4, 2005 - Dragoljub Simonović (1959)
- November 4, 2005 - June 12, 2008 - Blažo Stojanović (second term)
- June 12, 2008 - June 22, 2010 - Zoran Jovanović
- June 22, 2010 - June 15, 2012 - Milan Janković (second term)
- June 15, 2012 - December 28, 2012 - Dragoljub Simonović (second term)
- December 28, 2012 - May 27, 2014 - Zoran Markov
- May 27, 2014 - June 3, 2016 - Stefan Dilberović
- June 3, 2016 - March 20, 2019 - Dragoljub Simonović (third term)
- March 20, 2019 - September 3, 2020 - Živadinka Avramović
- September 3, 2020 - present - Dragan Pantelić

As a result of the economic and demographic discrepancy between the western and eastern parts of the municipality, there is a movement for splitting the municipality in two, or perhaps three parts. Primarily, it is about the division in two, with western half becoming new municipality of Vinča, while eastern remaining the municipality of Grocka. Also, there is a possibility of Vrčin splitting from Grocka and forming new municipality of Avalski Venac with other sub-Avalan settlements in the municipality of Voždovac (Beli Potok, Zuce, Pinosava).

== Town of Grocka ==
=== Economy ===
Grocka is at the center of one of the best known fruit growing areas in Serbia. Conditions are especially favorable for growing peaches, apricots, plums, cherries and grapes. Industrial processing of the fruit has been developed. There are also several mills and a textile industry (Kluz factory).

Traffic is also important as Grocka is located on the road of Smederevski put. It also has a small harbor on the Danube, at the Gročica's mouth (which regularly floods Grocka).

Tourism is important for the town's economy, with several festivals during the year (most notably, the Zlatni kotlić). Large weekend-settlement called Rujište is built on the eastern extension of the town.

One of the landmarks of Grocka for decades was the restaurant "Vinogradi" (vineyards). It was built on the hill of Agino Brdo, among the orchards and vineyards, 500 m (1,600 ft) from downtown Grocka and 25 km (16 mi) from Belgrade. It was known for the great cuisine and a magnificent panoramic view on Pančevo, Smederevo, Avala, but also on the distant Vršac Mountains and the Carpathians in Romania. Construction began in 1960. It used to be visited by President of Yugoslavia Josip Broz Tito, who often came via Danube in his yacht Šumadinka. In his 17 visitations, Tito also brought guests to the restaurant, like Sophia Loren, Elizabeth Taylor, Henry Kissinger, Valéry Giscard d'Estaing, Sukarno and Neil Armstrong. The luxurious venue served as the location of many movies, but from the 1990s it started to decline and by the early 21st century was completely abandoned and covered in overgrowth. In that period it was discovered that the restaurant had power generators, an independent water system with a well and pools of drinking water and a soundproof room, apparently used for listening and taping of the guests. In the 2010s, a local investor purchased the edifice, demolished the ruined remains and built a new building in the traditional style. It is expected that the restaurant will be reopened in 2018.

=== Culture and history ===
There are over 80 archaeological sites on the territory of Grocka, which point to the long and continuous habitation of the area. The 1974 digging at the location of the Rančić Family House produced artifacts and fragments from the Neolithic Starčevo and Vinča cultures (including fragments of the figurines), non-enamel ceramics from the 15th century, Turkish ceramics from the 16th-18th century and various objects from the 19th-20th century.

The area on which Grocka is located was once part of limes, a border defense system of Ancient Rome. The remains of several watch-towers and small forts were found in nearby villages along the banks of the Danube River. The municipality of Grocka is the richest in archaeological localities of all the Belgrade municipalities, but they are also among the least explored. Only in the village of Brestovik there are three localities: "Podunavlje-Hladna Voda-Vrtlog-Mikulje" Localities Complex (under preliminary protection), "Beli Breg" and "Goli Breg." Artifacts from Goli Breg are being kept in the National Museum in Belgrade and Museum of the city of Belgrade. Roman tomb in Brestovik, an ancient tomb, dating from c. 300, was discovered in 1895. Though evidence points to the tomb of a wealthy local, popular belief is that the "martyrs of Singidunum", Hermylus and Stratonicus, were buried inside. As one of the most important monuments from the Late Roman period in Belgrade and Serbia, the tomb has been protected since 1948. There are also Stones of Brestovik, which were transported into the yard of the Rančić Family house in Grocka in 2017. Preliminary examination showed that the stones are indeed archaeological artifacts. Based on their size, details, and robust frame, it is believed that they were part of some monumental construction from the Roman Antiquity period. Reliefs, or the "stone plastics", are still visible and they form a singular pattern on all three stones. That points to the conclusion that they are either segments of a sacral architecture, but more likely of a large public building, most certainly built before the 4th century, from the period of the golden age of the nearby Singidunum, modern Belgrade.

Roman forts, built to protect the Via Militaris road in the vicinity include Tricornium, in modern Ritopek, and Mutatio ad Sextum Militare, in Grocka itself.

The town was mentioned for the first time in 878, under the Slavic name Gardec, in the list of settlements by the local Bulgarian bishop. The present settlement was established in 1550 and given the title of varošica ("small town").

The town has a historical main street (čaršija) with shops, green market and a small administrative center, which has been turned into a pedestrian zone. Under the name Grocka's Čaršija, the area surrounding the street was placed under the state protection as the spatial cultural-historical unit.

The World-Famous Accordion manufacturing company Siwa & Figli was originally founded and headquartered in Grocka by Ivan Stanojlovic in 1985, before relocating to Castelfidardo, Italy, shortly after the Yugoslav Wars.

An annual festival "Gročanske svečanosti" (Grocka festivities) has been held since the 1960s. Fruit producers and artists meet in čaršija, while musical performances, sports tournaments, theatrical shows, and a fish soup cooking contest are held. The 50th "Gročanske svečanosti" were held in July–August 2017 and to mark the occasion, a sculpture of "Gročanka" (Girl from Grocka), which symbolizes the fruit production, was dedicated.

Tourist attractions include several old edifices from the 18th and 19th century: House of Apostolović, House of Nišli, Savić Mehana, Rančić Family House and House of Karapešić.

== Notable people ==
- Milan Nedić, born in Grocka. A general, but mostly known as a Prime Minister of the Nazi-backed Territory of the Military Commander in Serbia during World War II.
- Vesna Pešić, born in Grocka. Is a retired university professor and a politician, one of the longest serving leaders of opposition movement in Serbia.
- Bojan Mamić, lived in Grocka. He is a Serbian footballer.
- Ivan Paunić, lived in Grocka. He is a Serbian basketball player.
- Vasa Čarapić, was the duke of Grocka. He was one of notable figures of the First Serbian Uprising.
- Ilija Čarapić, was the duke of Grocka, aged 18. He was the first Mayor of Belgrade.
- Ilija Garašanin Spent last years of his life and died on his estate in Grocka. He was Serbian statesmen and a politician.
- Milutin Garašanin, Serbian politician; he spent a number of years on the family estate.

== International relations ==
=== Twin towns – Sister cities ===
Grocka is twinned with:

- Agia Paraskevi, Greece
- Koltsovo, Russia

== See also ==
- Subdivisions of Belgrade
- List of Belgrade neighborhoods and suburbs
- Battle of Grocka

== Sources ==
- Mala Prosvetina Enciklopedija, Third edition (1985); Prosveta; ISBN 86-07-00001-2
- Jovan Đ. Marković (1990): Enciklopedijski geografski leksikon Jugoslavije; Svjetlost-Sarajevo; ISBN 86-01-02651-6
