= Branimir Rančić =

Serbian politician

Branimir Rančić (Serbian Cyrillic: Бранимир Ранчић; born 1953) is a medical doctor and politician in Serbia. He has served in the National Assembly of Serbia since 2015 as a member of the Serbian Progressive Party.

== Early life and career ==
Rančić is a doctor of neuropsychiatry working in Gadžin Han. He lives in Niš.

== Political career ==
Rančić received the 172nd position on the Progressive Party's Aleksandar Vučić — Future We Believe In electoral list for the 2014 Serbian parliamentary election. The list won a landslide victory with 158 out of 250 mandates; Rančić was not initially re-elected but received a mandate on January 27, 2015, as a replacement for Vladeta Kostić, who had resigned. He was promoted to the thirty-eighth position in the 2016 parliamentary election and was elected when the list won a second consecutive majority with 131 seats.

Rančić is the deputy chair of the assembly committee on labour, social issues, social inclusion, and poverty reduction; a deputy member of the health and family committee; the deputy chair of a working group on the political empowerment of persons with disabilities; and a member of the parliamentary friendship groups with Belarus, Bosnia and Herzegovina, Bulgaria, Italy, Kazakhstan, Switzerland, and the United States of America.
