= Brestovik =

- Suburban settlement
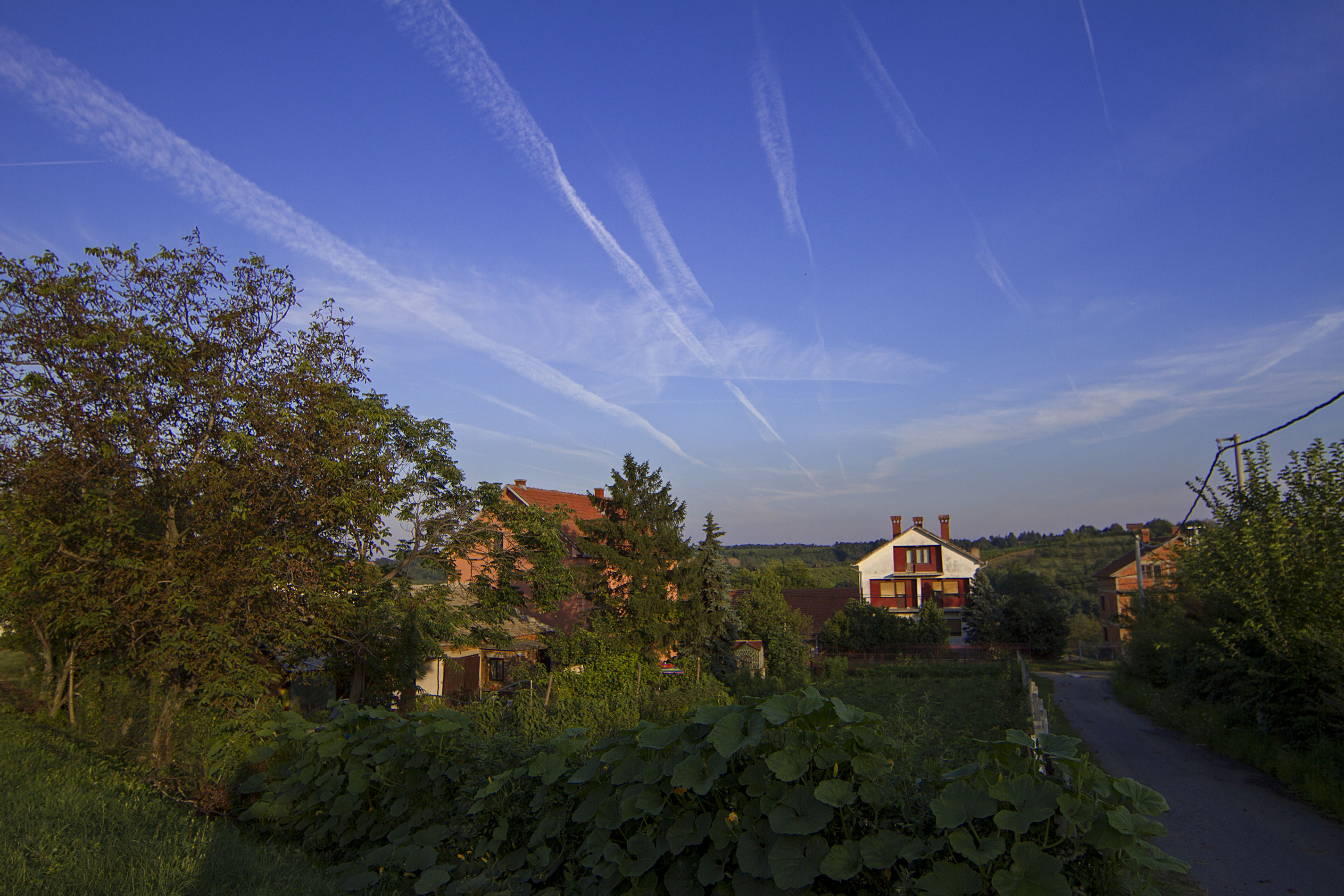

- Location within Serbia
- Coordinates: 44°38′43″N 20°45′57″E
- Country: Serbia
- Time zone: UTC+1 (CET)
  - Summer (DST): UTC+2 (CEST)

Brestovik (Serbian Cyrillic: Брестовик) is a suburban settlement of Belgrade, the capital of Serbia. It is located in the municipality of Grocka.

== Location ==
Brestovik is located in the eastern part of the municipality, on the border of the municipality of Grocka (and the City of Belgrade) and municipality of Smederevo (and the Podunavlje District). It is 6 km east of the municipal seat of Grocka and almost 40 km east of Belgrade. It is located on the southern bank of the Danube.

== Population ==
Brestovik is a small, depopulating village (population of 1,129 in 1991 and 1,076 in 2002), on the road of Smederevski put which connects Belgrade and Smederevo.

As the village and the vast weekend-settlement in the eastern part of Grocka developed, Brestovik now forms a single built-up area with Grocka, and generally, through the string of villages on the Smederevski put, one urban built-up area (almost 80,000 inhabitants) forms from Grocka to Smederevo (as Smederevo is twice as closer to Grocka than Belgrade).

== Characteristics ==
One section of the road separates at Brestovik and connects it to the Belgrade-Niš highway to the south. The Geomagnetic observatory was built in the village in 1957, the first of that kind in former Yugoslavia.

The name of the village is descriptive, meaning elm forest. In Ottoman period, group of settlers crossed the Danube and established a new village named Banatski Brestovac, further from the left bank of the Danube.

== Archaeology ==
The municipality of Grocka is the richest in archaeological localities of all Belgrade municipalities, but they are also among the least explored. In Brestovik itself, there are three localities: "Podunavlje-Hladna Voda-Vrtlog-Mikulje" Localities Complex (under preliminary protection), "Beli Breg" and "Goli Breg" (artifacts from Goli Breg are being kept in the National Museum in Belgrade and Museum of the city of Belgrade.

=== Roman Tomb in Brestovik ===
It is location of the Roman tomb in Brestovik, an ancient tomb, dating from c. 300, which was discovered in 1895. Though evidence points to the tomb of a wealthy local, popular belief is that the "martyrs of Singidunum", Hermylus and Stratonicus, were buried inside. As one of the most important monuments from the Late Roman period in Belgrade and Serbia, the tomb is protected since 1948.

=== Stones of Brestovik ===
For years, three monumental rectangular stones were standing at the village's bus stop. The local population believes that some of the inhabitants discovered them while working in the field and dragged them to the bus stop, but no one remembers who or when. People used them as benches, for sitting and resting feet while waiting for the bus. As one of the stones was moved, the local Cultural Center was notified as the stones were perceived as a potential archaeological finds. The transportation of the stones was organized in August 2017. It turned out that a crane which lifts 2 t (2.0 long tons; 2.2 short tons) was needed to lift them. They were transported into the yard of the Rančić Family house in Grocka, itself a cultural monument since 1966, where they will be safer, properly protected and accessible for the further studies.

Preliminary examination showed that the stones are indeed archaeological artifacts. Based on their size, details and robust frame, it is believed that they were part of some monumental construction from the Roman Antiquity period. Reliefs, or the "stone plastics", are still visible and they form a singular pattern on all three stones. That points to the conclusion that they are either segments of a sacral architecture, but more likely of a large public building, most certainly built before the 4th century, from the period of the golden age of the nearby Singidunum, modern Belgrade.
