= Rančić Family House, Grocka =

Coordinates: 44.6722°N 20.7175°E

Rančić Family House in Grocka
- Serbian: Ранчићева кућа
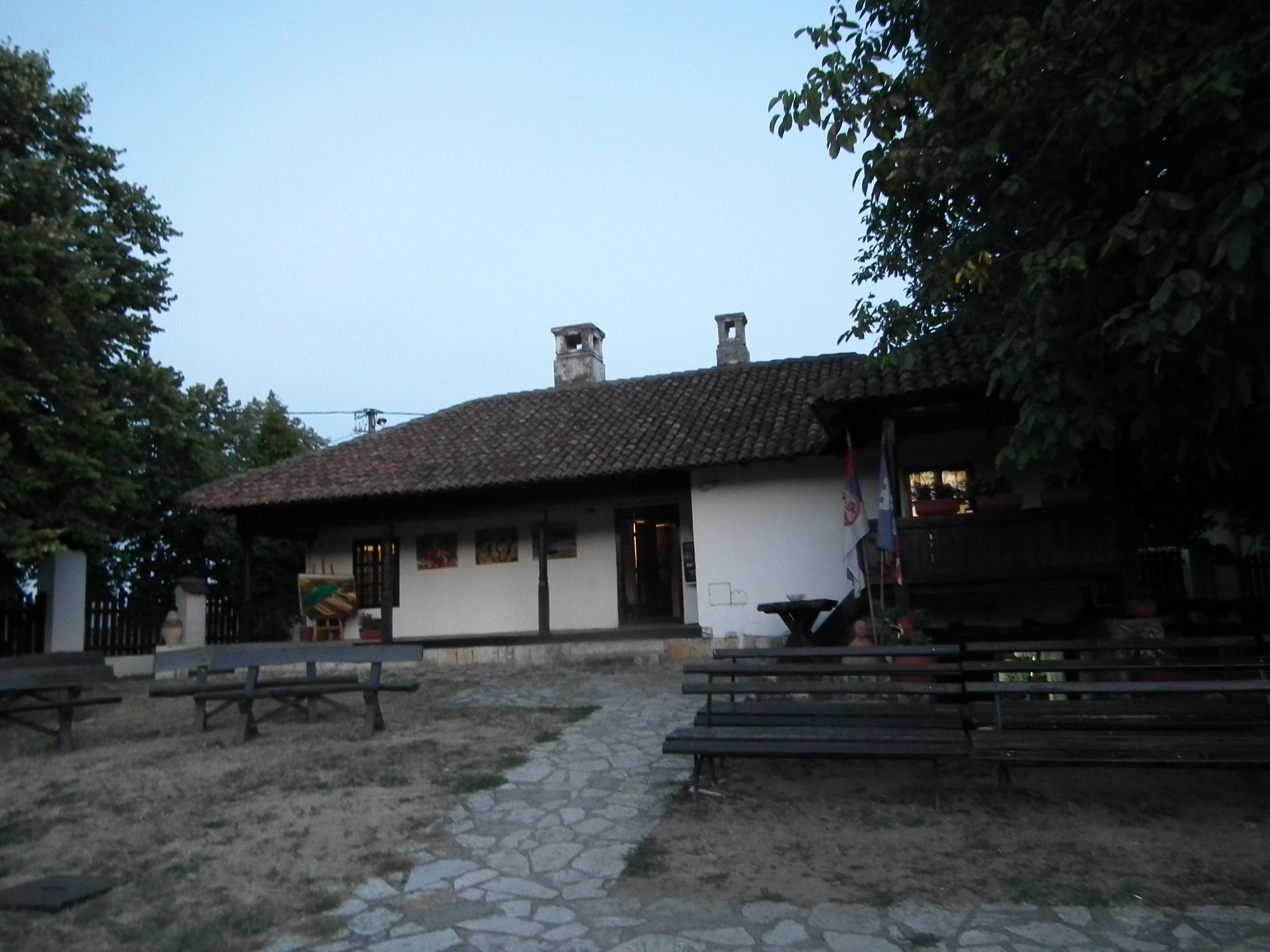
- Rančić Family house in Grocka

Location
- Location: Grocka, Belgrade, Serbia
- Interactive map of Rančić Family House in Grocka

Architecture
- Completed: 19th century

The Rančić Family House (Serbian: Ранчићева кућа) is located in Grocka, at 9 Majevička Street, in the immediate vicinity of the Čaršija (historical main street), on an elevated, spacious plot, set free in relation with the street regulation. The house was built at the beginning of the 19th century as a two-part Kosovo-style ground-floor house. The building is a half-timbered construction filled built with wattle and daub, and covered with four-sided ceramides (a type of roof tile) roof with large roof drains – eaves. Along the entire front facade, there was a very deep architraved porch leveled with the terrain. There was a special door leading from the porch into the "house," that is, the room, while the internal communication between the "house" and the room was left out. The rooms in the house were separated, not mutually connected, so later on, the house was rebuilt. It was elevated then so that it got a basement and a veranda, which gave it the appearance of the townhouse. The present organization of the rooms was done around the heart room, as the central room was directly connected to the porch.

== The architecture ==
In the middle of the 19th century, changes were made in the design construction for, which dominated in the village in the 1830s and as a result so-called Grocka town houses appeared, so Rančić family house also belonged to this group of houses. The basis is widened and the house got larger dimensions and new organization of space. As most of such houses in Grocka, Rančić family house after the change consisted of four rooms of a strictly defined purpose: heart room, living room, two bedrooms, basement and a porch, which on the corner enlarges into the veranda. The house was built in half-timbered construction, with the frame built out of the oak beams filled with wattle and daub or adobe. The foundations are built from the stone and oak beams. The roof is low, four-sided and covered in ceramide. The roof drains which protect the facade reach one metre in width. In the inside of the house, on the porch and on the veranda, the floors are paved with bricks or wooden boards. Although peculiar, first of all in the arrangements and purpose of the rooms, the town house in Grocka, that is, Rančić family house, is not isolated, but it is connected to the same house type as in towns in Podunavlje and Pomoravlje. Similarities between Grocka town houses and those in other towns in Podunavlje (Smederevo, Dobra, Golubac) can be associated with the common natural and social factors which existed in this area. From the aspect of architectural and ethnographic values, Rančić family house represents a rarely saved example of the folk construction in the area around the City of Belgrade, whose characteristics represent the great achievement of construction, residential and artistic culture.

== Conservation works ==
Conservation and restoration works were conducted for the first time in 1970, after which the Rančić Family House became the Native Land Museum where Dubočajska collection of Dr. Коstić. During the year 2000, the sanitation of damage was carried out and the surrounding area was decorated. The building is now home to the cultural centre of the Municipality of Grocka.

== The cultural monument ==
The Rančić family house has had the status of the cultural monument of great importance since 1966.

== See also ==
- Spisak spomenika kulture u Beogradu
