= Dragoljub Simonović (politician) =

Serbian politician

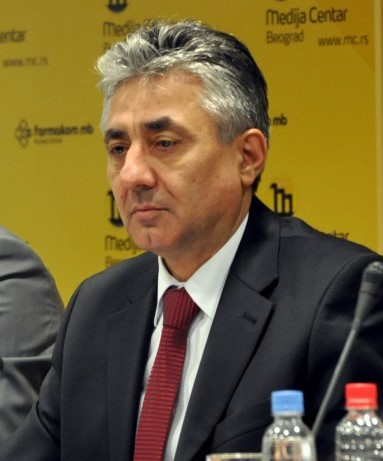
Simonović in 2013

Dragoljub Simonović (Serbian Cyrillic: Драгољуб Симоновић; born 8 July 1959) is a Serbian former politician. He was a member of the National Assembly of Serbia from 2004 to 2008, served three terms as mayor of the Belgrade municipality of Grocka, and was the chair of Serbian Railways from 2012 to 2014. Originally a member of the far-right Serbian Radical Party, he joined the breakaway Serbian Progressive Party on its formation in 2008. In February 2021, he was convicted of inciting an arson attack that resulted in serious damage to the home of an opposition journalist. He was sentenced to 5 years in prison in March 2023.

== Early life and private career ==
Simonović worked for Serbian Railways for eleven years. During the 2003 Serbian parliamentary election, he described himself as a mechanical technician. In the 2012 parliamentary election, he was listed as a graduated economist.

== Politician ==
=== Parliamentarian ===
Simonović appeared in the sixty-sixth position on the Radical Party's electoral list in the 2003 Serbian parliamentary election. On election day, he and three other Radical Party members broke a number of ballot boxes in what was described as a protest against non-compliance with the election rules. For this offense, he spent twenty-seven days in the Padinska Skela prison.

The Radicals won eighty-two out of 250 seats in the 2003 election, emerging as the largest single party in the national assembly but falling well short of a majority; they ultimately served in opposition in the parliament that followed. Simonović was not initially chosen for his party's assembly delegation but was awarded a mandate as the replacement for another party member on 12 February 2004 and served for the remainder of the term. (From 2000 to 2011, mandates in Serbian parliamentary elections were awarded to sponsoring parties or coalitions rather than individual candidates, and it was common practice for the mandates to be assigned out of numerical order. Simonović's position on the list had no bearing on whether or when he received a mandate.)

He appeared in the sixty-third position on the Radical Party's list for the 2007 parliamentary election and was selected for a second mandate when the list won eighty-one seats. The Radicals continued to serve in opposition. Simonović was given the eighty-second position on the Radical list for the 2008 parliamentary election; the list won seventy-eight seats on this occasion, and he was this time not included in the party's delegation.

The Radical Party experienced a serious split later in 2008, with several members joining the more moderate Serbian Progressive Party under the leadership of Tomislav Nikolić and Aleksandar Vučić. Simonović sided with the Progressives.

Serbia's election system was reformed in 2011, such that parliamentary mandates were awarded in numerical order to candidates on successful lists. Simonović was given the 158th position on the Progressive Party's Let's Get Serbia Moving list for the 2012 parliamentary election and was not elected when the list won seventy-three seats. He has not sought re-election to the national assembly since this time.

=== Local politics ===
Simonović ran for election to the City Assembly of Belgrade in the 2000 Serbian local elections, appearing as the Radical Party's candidate in Grocka's first division. He lost to Vesna Ivić of the Democratic Opposition of Serbia. The 2000 local elections were held via first-past-the-post voting in constituency seats; all subsequent local election cycles in Serbia have been held under proportional representation.

Simonović appeared in the lead position on the Radical Party's list for the Grocka municipal assembly in the 2004 local elections and was elected when the list won eight of out thirty-five seats. There was no clear winner in the election, and the Radicals initially served in opposition. Simonović became mayor of the municipality for the first time on 23 June 2005 when a new local coalition government was formed, although he left the position on 4 November of the same year after further political re-alignment.

He again appeared in the lead position on the Radical list for Grocka in the 2008 local elections and received a mandate for another term when the list won thirteen seats. After this election, he left the Radicals and became the local leader of the Progressives.

Simonović led the Progressive list to a plurality victory with eleven out of thirty-five seats in Grocka in the 2012 local elections. He formed a local coalition government after the election and was chosen as mayor for a second time on 15 June 2012. His term in office was again relatively brief; he resigned on 28 December 2012, having been appointed as general director of Serbian railways. He served in the latter position until his removal in July 2014.

He returned to local politics for the 2016 Serbian local elections and once again appeared in the lead position on the Progressive list in Grocka. On this occasion, the list won a majority victory with twenty seats. He was selected for a third term as mayor after the election.

== Director of Serbian Railways ==
Simonović was appointed as director of Serbian Railways in December 2012. Shortly after his appointment, he said that Serbian trains and lines would be modernized in the next five years thanks to a planned Russian loan of $800 million. In early 2014, he announced the launch of electric train service from Kraljevo to the northern part of Kosovska Mitrovica, in the disputed territory of Kosovo.

His tenure as director was controversial. In late 2013, the Union of Railways Workers of Serbia called for his removal, citing poor labour-management relations and a series of problems affecting the company. In February 2014, workers from the union reiterated their demands in a protest outside the administrative building of Serbian Railways, citing what they described as significant company losses due to corruption.

Simonović was one of several public directors dismissed by the government in July 2014, on the grounds of achieving poor results.

== Arrest and conviction ==
On 12 December 2018, the house of Grocka journalist Milan Jovanović was set on fire after a Molotov cocktail was thrown through a window in his garage. Jovanović and his wife escaped without serious injury. Jovanović was an editor of the information portal Žig Info and had frequently accused Simonović of nepotism and corruption. In the aftermath of the attack, one of Jovanović's colleagues said that he and Jovanović had repeatedly reported threats against them to the Belgrade prosecutor's office, without receiving a response. Simonović was arrested on suspicion of inciting the attack on 25 January 2019; his arrest was announced by Serbian president Aleksandar Vučić in an extraordinary press conference. Simonović formally resigned as mayor of Grocka on 20 March 2019.

On 23 February 2021, the Second Basic Court in Belgrade found Simonović guilty of inciting the arson attack. The verdict issued by Judge Slavko Žugić found that Simonović had encouraged police officer Vladimir Mihailović to send a warning to Jovanović by burning the latter's car; Mihailović, in turn, incited Igor Novaković to commit the crime, and Novaković hired Aleksandar Marinković to actually carry out the arson attack. When Marinković threw a Molotov cocktail into the garage, the fire quickly spread to the rest of Jovanović's house. For his role in the attack, Simonović was sentenced to four years and three months in prison. He maintains his innocence in the matter.

On 20 March 2023, Simonović was sentenced to five years in prison.

== Electoral record ==
=== Local (City Assembly of Belgrade) ===
2000 City of Belgrade election Grocka Division I
Radomir Đurđević	Serbian Party	
Vesna Ivić	Democratic Opposition of Serbia	Elected
Slobodan Jeremić	Serbia Together	
Bojan Ljubenović	Serbian Renewal Movement	
Dragoljub Simonović	Serbian Radical Party	
Radovan Todorović	Socialist Party of Serbia–Yugoslav Left	
