= Umčari =

Coordinates: 44°35′N 20°44′E

- Suburban settlement
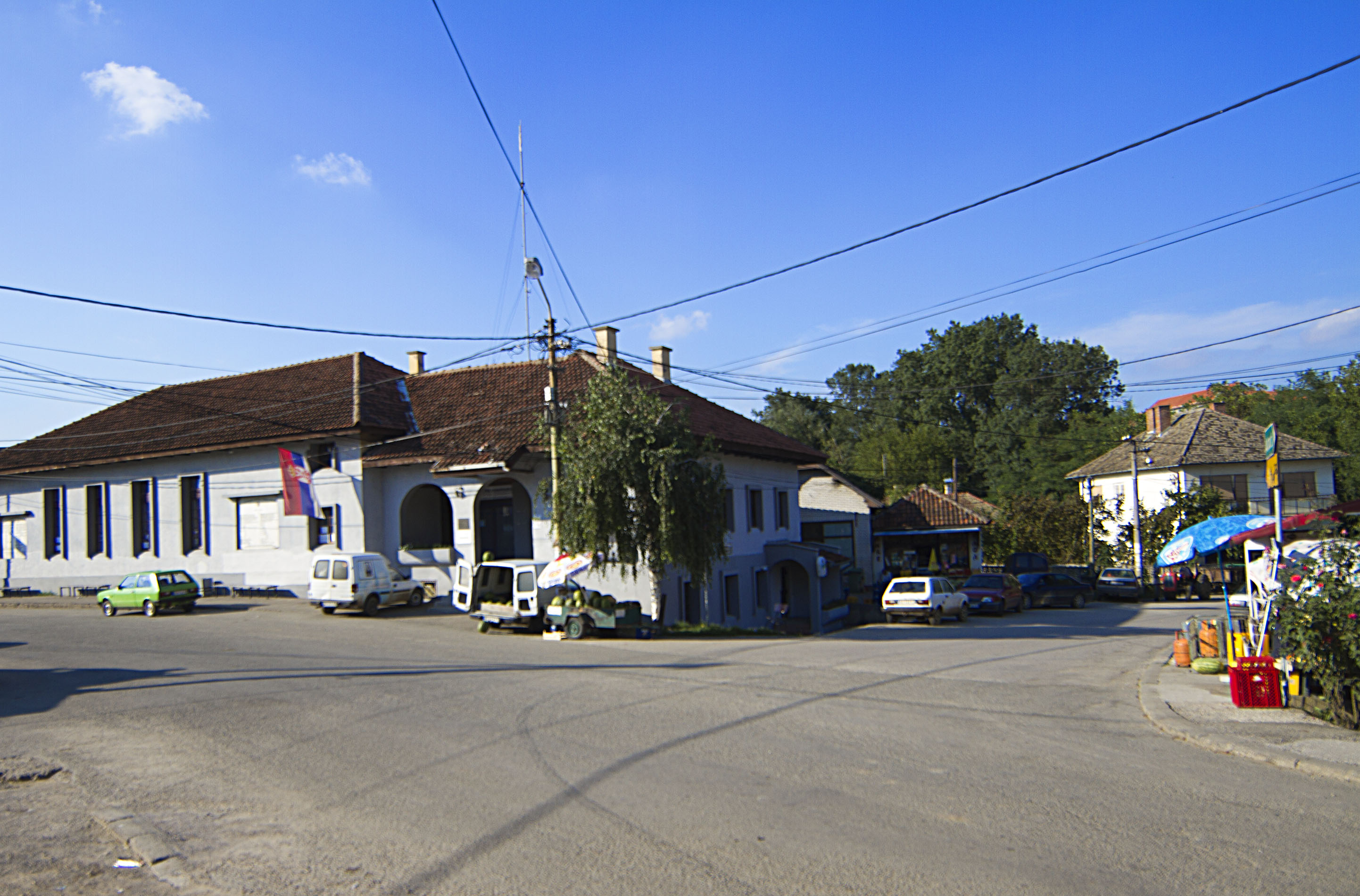
- Umčari Center
- Interactive map of Umčari
- Country: Serbia
- Time zone: UTC+1 (CET)
  - Summer (DST): UTC+2 (CEST)

Umčari (Serbian Cyrillic: Умчари) is a suburban settlement of Belgrade, the capital of Serbia. It is located in Belgrade's municipality of Grocka.

Umčari is located in the southeastern part of the municipality, in the northern Šumadija region. It is situated on the Ralja river, on both the railway Belgrade-Požarevac and the highway Belgrade-Niš, 40 km southeast of Belgrade and 11 km south of the municipal seat of Grocka.

Umčari is statistically classified as a rural settlement (village). For 70 years the population of the village stagnated but began depopulating in the 1990s. The population of Umčari:

- 1921 - 3,560
- 1971 - 3,400
- 1981 - 3,398
- 1991 - 3,487
- 2002 - 2,880

The economy is based solely on agriculture. Umčari was the seat of its own municipality until the early 1960s when it was disbanded and annexed to the municipality of Grocka.

Fifth century BC Greek ornamented silver belts, pins, brooches and more were found at excavations of graves in Umčari.

== Notable ==
- The parents of Austrian footballer Aleksandar Dragović originate from Umčari.
