= Gornja Toponica =

Gornja Toponica may refer to:

- Gornja Toponica (Niš), a village in Serbia
- Gornja Toponica (Prokuplje), a village in Serbia
