= Crveni Krst, Niš =

Coordinates: 45°31′51″N 19°08′22″E

Crveni Krst Црвени крст
- City municipality
- City municipality of Crveni Krst; Градска општина Црвени крст
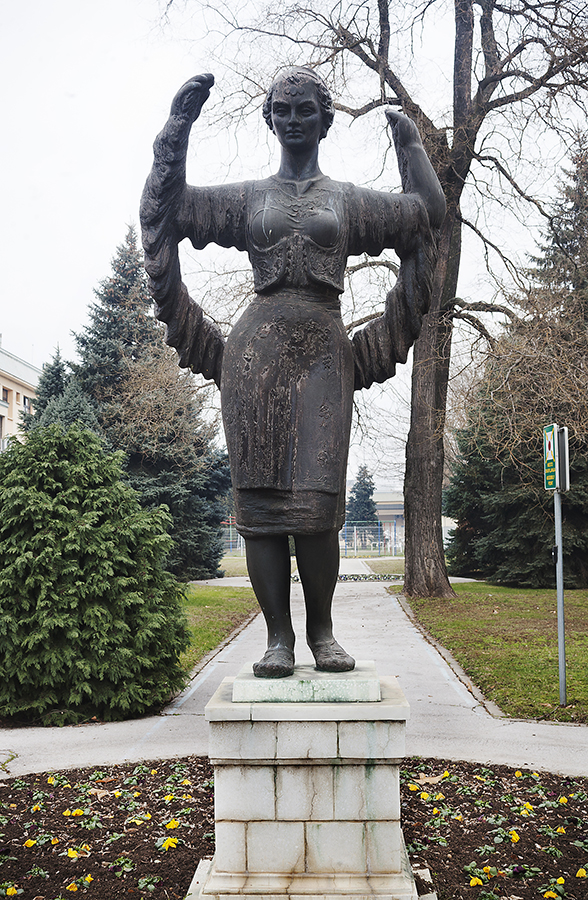
- Sculpture in the courtyard of Philip Morris International tobacco factory

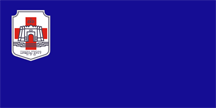
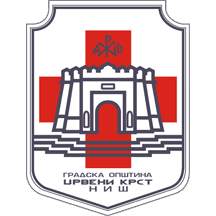
- Flag Coat of arms

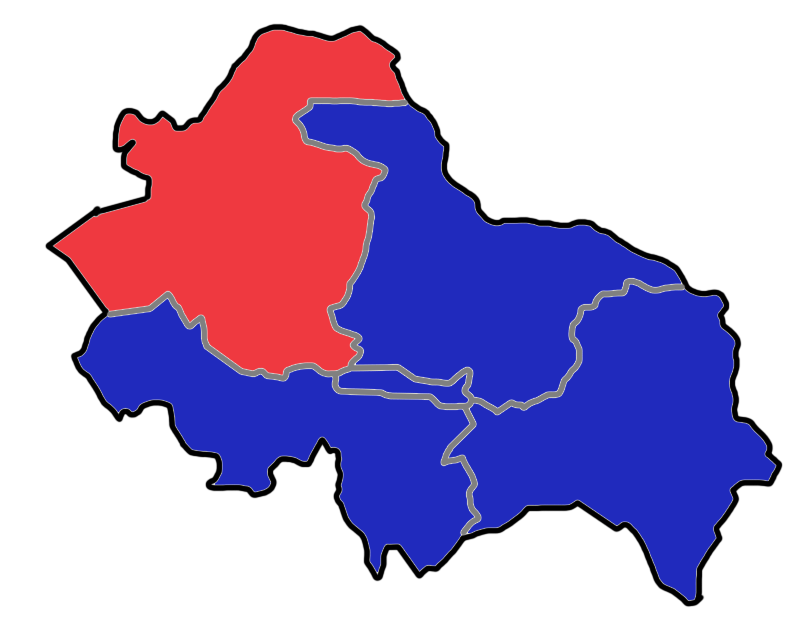
- Location of the municipality of Crveni Krst within City of Niš
- Country: Serbia
- Region: Southern and Eastern Serbia
- District: Nišava
- City: Niš
- Settlements: 24

Government
  - Mayor: Miroslav Milutinović (SNS)

Area
  - Municipality: 181.74 km^{2} (70.17 sq mi)

Population (2011 census)
  - Urban: 12,516
  - Municipality: 32,301
- Time zone: UTC+1 (CET)
  - Summer (DST): UTC+2 (CEST)
- Postal code: 18000
- Area code: +381(0)18
- Car plates: NI
- Website: http://gocrvenikrst.rs/pocetna

Crveni Krst (Serbian Cyrillic: Црвени крст, pronounced [tsrʋɛni kř̩ːst]; translated: Red Cross) is one of five city municipalities which constitute the city of Niš. According to the 2011 census, the municipality has a population of 32,301 inhabitants.

== Geography ==
The municipality borders Aleksinac municipality in the north-west, Svrljig municipality in the north-east, Pantelej municipality in the east, Medijana municipality in the south-east, Palilula municipality in the south, and Merošina municipality in the south-west.

== History ==
Crveni Krst Municipality was formed on 6 June 2002. It was the site of a concentration camp during World War II.

== Demographics ==
According to the 2011 census, the municipality had a population of 32,301 inhabitants, with 12,516 in the eponymous settlement.

=== Settlements ===
The municipality consists of 24 settlements, all of which are classified as rural, except for Crveni Krst, which is a part of a larger urban settlement of Niš.

- Berčinac, population 105
- Vele Polje, population 454
- Vrtište, population 1,112
- Gornja Toponica, population 1,127
- Gornja Trnava, population 286
- Gornji Komren, population 917
- Donja Toponica, population 324
- Donja Trnava, population 647
- Donji Komren, population 1,838
- Kravlje, population 327
- Leskovik, population 248
- Medoševac, population 2,674
- Mezgraja, population 541
- Miljkovac, population 182
- Crveni Krst, population 12,516
- Paligrace, population 269
- Paljina, population 234
- Popovac, population 2,847
- Rujnik, population 490
- Sečanica, population 768
- Supovac, population 344
- Trupale, population 2,127
- Hum, population 1,370
- Čamurlija, population 554

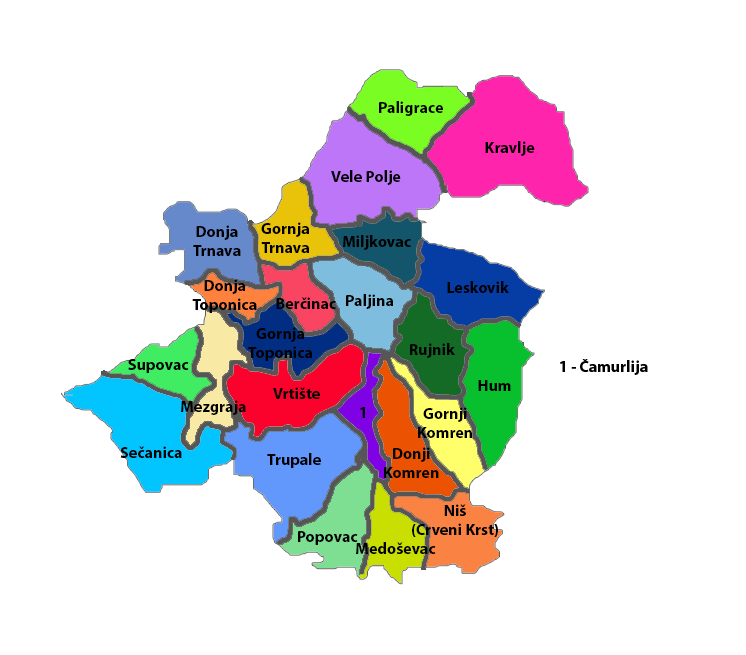
Map of settlements in Crveni Krst municipality

=== Neighborhoods ===
Neighborhoods of municipality of Crveni Krst include:

- Crveni Krst
- Beograd Mala
- Jagodin Mala (partly)
- Šljaka
- Komren (mostly)
- Ratko Jović

== International cooperation ==
Crveni Krst is twinned with the following cities and municipalities:

- Istočna Ilidža, Bosnia and Herzegovina (2021)

== See also ==
- Subdivisions of Serbia
- Niš
