= Ratko Jović, Niš =

Ratko Jović Ратко Јовић
- Urban neighborhood
- Location within Serbia
- Coordinates: 43°20′38″N 21°52′23″E
- Country: Serbia
- City: Niš
- Municipality: Crveni Krst

Area
  - Total: 1.5 km^{2} (0.58 sq mi)
  - Residential: 0.7 km^{2} (0.27 sq mi)
- Elevation: 210 m (690 ft)

Population (2011)Estimated
  - Total: 5,000
  - Density: 3,300/km^{2} (8,600/sq mi)
- Time zone: UTC+1 (CET)
  - Summer (DST): UTC+2 (CEST)
- Area code: +381(0)18
- Car plates: NI

Ratko Jović (Serbian Cyrillic: Ратко Јовић); is an urban neighborhood in Niš. It is located in the municipality of Crveni Krst.

== Location ==
Neighborhood is located in north-west part of the city. On the north and east it's bordered by boulevard of Nikola Tesla, on the south by industrial zone, and the west by Constantine the Great Airport. Airport itself is sometimes included in Ratko Jović. River Hum flows throughout the neighborhood. The residential area of the neighborhood is around 0.7 square kilometers. Its population is between 2,500 and 3,000 people.

== History ==
The neighborhood was created in the 1960s in order to connect the village of Donji Komren with the City of Niš. In the beginning it was named Novi Komren, but later the name was changed to Ratko Jović. Ratomir Ratko Jović was a Yugoslav World War 2 hero. Since then it became the industrial centre of the city, with many factories such as: Kopex MIN, Johnson Electric, NIS and Jastrebac. In 2012, Russian-Serbian Humanitarian Centre was opened.

== Transportation ==
Constantine the Great Airport is an international airport that connects with Niš many European cities, such as Zürich, Bratislava, Bergamo and Vienna. The Pan-European Corridor X Branch C is bordering the neighborhood at connects it to Sofia. Boulevards of Nikola Tesla and 12 February are passing throughout Ratko Jović.
