= Donja Trnava (Niš) =

- Village
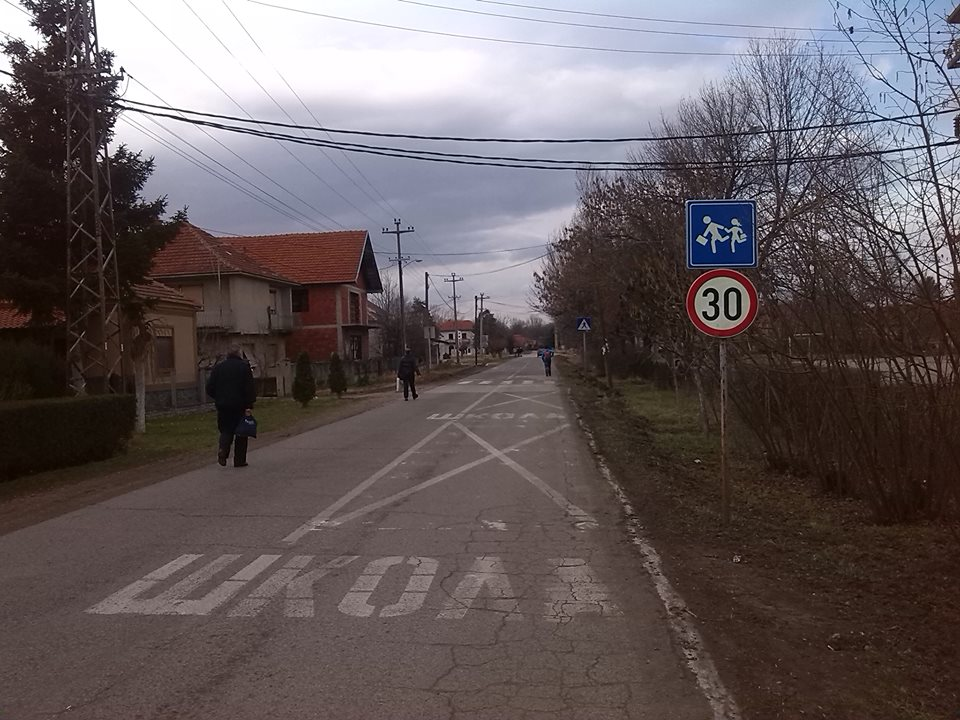
- Donja Trnava, main street

- Location within Serbia
- Coordinates: 43°25′21″N 21°46′47″E
- Country: Serbia
- Region: Southern and Eastern Serbia
- District: Nišava
- City: Niš
- Municipality: Crveni Krst

Population (2002)
  - Total: 697
- Time zone: UTC+1 (CET)
  - Summer (DST): UTC+2 (CEST)

Donja Trnava is a village situated in Niš municipality in Serbia. According to the 2002 census, there were 697 inhabitants in Donja Trnava.
