= Jastrebac =

Mountain in Serbia

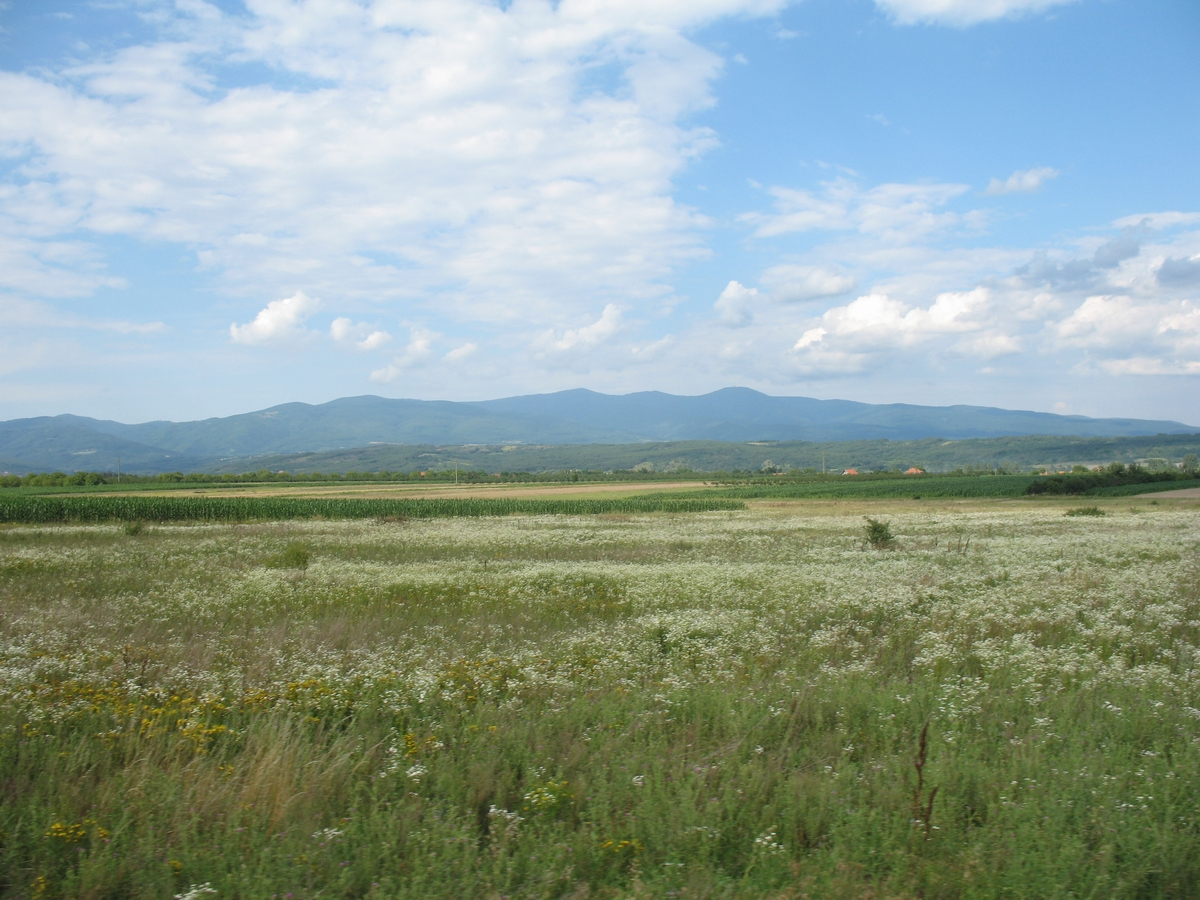

Highest point
- Elevation: 1,491 m (4,892 ft)
- Coordinates: 43°23′31″N 21°26′57″E

Geography
- Location within Serbia
- Location: Central Serbia
- Parent range: Dinaric Alps

Jastrebac (Serbian Cyrillic: Јастребац) is a mountain in central Serbia, between cities of Niš, Kruševac and Prokuplje. It consists of two massifs, Great (Veliki) and Small (Mali) Jastrebac. Its highest peak, Velika Đulica, has an elevation of 1,491 meters above sea level. It is well-forested and presents a popular hiking and mountaineering destination.

Jastrebac is bounded by the rivers of West Morava on the west, Toplica on the south and Rasina on the east. Despite the relatively low height, it is prominent because of the surrounding valleys. The mountain is close to other mountain peaks such as Leskovik (4.4 miles away), and Šiljak Rtanj (6.5 miles away).

== See also ==
- List of mountains in Serbia
