= Donja Toponica =

Donja Toponica may refer to:

- Donja Toponica (Niš), a village in Niš, Serbia
- Donja Toponica (Prokuplje), a village in Prokuplje, Serbia
