= Berčinac =

Village in Southern and Eastern Serbia

- Village
- Location within Serbia
- Country: Serbia
- Region: Southern and Eastern Serbia
- District: Nišava
- City: Niš
- Municipality: Crveni Krst

Population (2022)
  - Total: 121
- Time zone: UTC+1 (CET)
  - Summer (DST): UTC+2 (CEST)

Berčinac is an inhabited settlement in Serbia in the city of Nisavski. It is located in southeastern Europe, 12 km northwest from the city of Niš. According to the census of 2022, there were 121 people (according to the census of 1991, there were 162 inhabitants).

== History ==
On the Turkish census in 1498 it was recorded with 20 homes (7 of single and 1 widow's), 3 rajinske water mills that operate all year round and duties of the village of 3412 akčas. According to the Turkish census nahija Nis from 1516, the city was one of the 111 villages nahija and carried the same name as today, and had 25 houses, 2 widow's household, five single-person households. After decades of testing in the late period of Ottoman rule (after the Nis revolt in 1841 was burned), became part of Serbia as a small village. After liberation from the Turks, most households could get hold of larger complex of the country, but, in addition to extensive agriculture, material existence is largely based on livestock farming, sale of forest wood and vodeničarstvu. Disintegration of family cooperatives and the subsequent divisions of the country estates are fragmented. After World War II, especially after 1960/65. year, strengthened the tendency of abandoning agriculture, to evict or orientation of a mixed economy. Basic agricultural character of the village, however, is still detained, though, especially since 1970/75. year, a considerable number of elderly households. Since 1975/80, the appearance is the new tendency to obtaining of land for the construction of field houses (holiday). According to census data from 1971: in the village lived 33 agricultural, 16 mixed and 3 non-agricultural households.

== Demographics ==
At the end of the 19th century (1895) Berčinac was a small village with 19 households and 115 inhabitants. In 1930 it had a population of 28 households and 163 inhabitants.

In the village Berčinac live 107 adult inhabitants, and the average age is 49.8 years (47.9 for men and 51.7 for women). The village has 51 households, and the average number of occupants per household is 2.53. This village is largely populated by Serbs (according to the census of 2002) and in the last three censuses, noticed a decline in population.
