= Beograd Mala =

Beograd Mala Београд Maлa
- Neighborhood
- Location within Serbia
- Coordinates: 43.324522°N 21.89028°E
- Country: Serbia
- Region: Southern and Eastern Serbia
- District: Nišava
- City: Niš
- Municipality: Crveni Krst
- Time zone: UTC+1 (CET)
  - Summer (DST): UTC+2 (CEST)

Beograd Mala (Serbian Cyrillic: Београд Maлa) is a neighborhood of the city of Niš, Serbia. It is located in Niš municipality of Crveni Krst.

== Location ==
Beograd Mala is in the central parts of Niš. It is flat and bordered on the north by neighborhood of Crveni Krst and on the south by Nišava river.

The neighborhood is situated at one of important enter points of the city, and the main access to the E75 highway to Belgrade is located here. This fact is even reflected in the name of the neighborhood, as it was named per gate that looks towards Belgrade. The main city bus station is located in this area as well.

== Characteristics ==
The neighborhood is partly residential, and partly commercial. It is traditionally inhabited by a Romani community.
