= Paljina oil shale deposit =

- Location: Paljina, Nišava District, Serbia
- Products: Oil shale

The Paljina oil shale deposit is an oil shale deposit located in Paljina, Nišava District, Serbia. The deposit has oil shale reserves amounting to 500 million tonnes, one of the largest oil shale reserves in Serbia and Europe and has an organic content equivalent to 16.5 million tonnes of shale oil.
