= Komren =

Neighborhood in Niš, Serbia

Komren (Serbian Cyrillic: Koмpeн) is a neighborhood of the city of Niš, Serbia. It is located in Niš municipalities of Crveni Krst

== Location ==
Komren is in the north-west outskirts of Niš. It is flat and bordered on the east by the hill Vinik, on the south by the Industrial Zone. On the west is located the city's main airport, Airport Constantine the Great.

== History ==
Before the Second World War, Komren surrounded two villages: Gornji Komren and Donji Komren. After the Second World War, the development of near-by steel and tobacco industries and the lack of proper public commuting for workers led to heavy migration into surrounding areas. New settlements that have emerged as an expansion of original settlements were Novi Komren (suburb: Ratko Jović) and Naselje Donji Komren (suburb: Branko Bjegović). All of the Komren neighborhoods are now incorporated into the Niš urban area.

== Characteristics ==
The neighborhood is partly industrial and partly residential. The Komren neighborhood consists of:

- Branko Bjegović,
- Donji Komren,
- Gornji Komren.

== Future development ==
City government reserved the area in the neighborhood bordered on the east by the hill Vinik for future Free custom zone. The city government has announced the working project of construction of a new retail and entertainment complex in this neighborhood.
