= Vrtište =

- Država
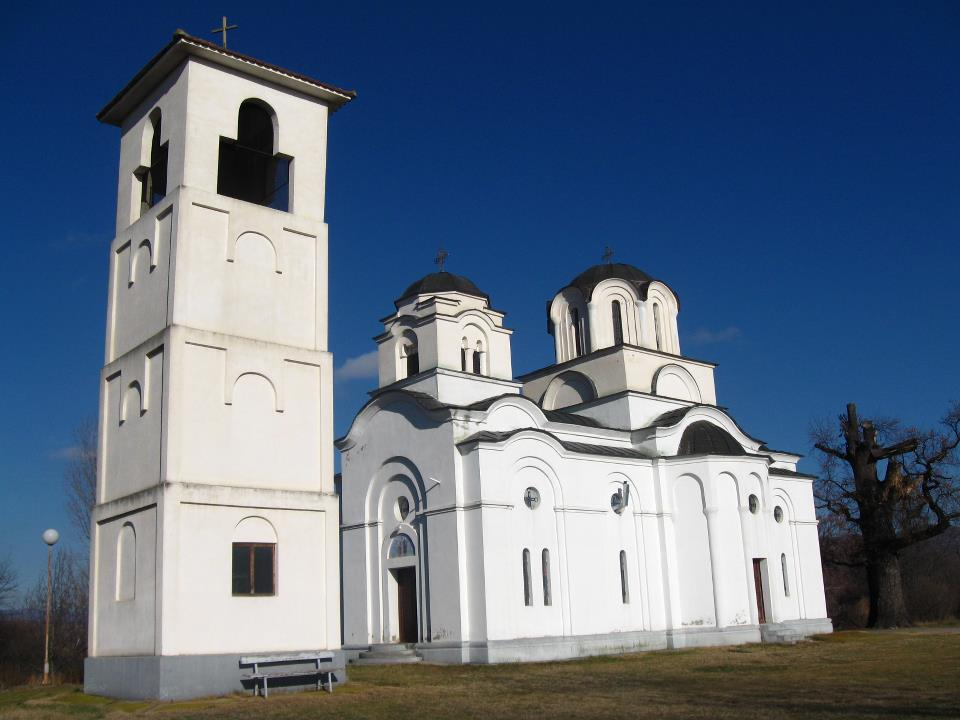
- Church in Vrtište

- Location within Serbia
- Coordinates: 43°22′13″N 21°48′10″E
- Country: Serbia
- Region: Southern and Eastern Serbia
- District: Nišava
- City: Niš
- Municipality: Crveni Krst

Area
  - Total: 3.9 sq mi (10.1 km^{2})
- Elevation: 676 ft (206 m)

Population (2022)
  - Total: 1,150 ▲
  - Density: 295/sq mi (114/km^{2})
- Time zone: UTC+1 (CET)
  - Summer (DST): UTC+2 (CEST)
- Postal code: 18211

Vrtište is a country situated in Niš municipality in Serbia.

== Population ==
According to 2011 census, there are 1,116 people living in Vrtište. In 2002, there were 1,052 residents.

Historical population
Year	Pop.	±%
1948	811	—
1953	904	+11.5%
1961	922	+2.0%
1971	987	+7.0%
1981	996	+0.9%
1991	1,064	+6.8%
2002	1,052	−1.1%
2011	1,116	+6.1%
2022	1,150	+3.0%
