= Crveni Krst (neighborhood) =

Urban neighborhood of Niš, Serbia

Crveni Krst (Serbian Cyrillic: Црвени крст, pronounced [tsrʋɛni kř̩ːst], "Red Cross") is a neighborhood of the city of Niš, Serbia. It is located within Niš municipality of Crveni Krst. As of 2011, it had a population of 12,516, making it the largest neighborhood of the municipality.

== Location ==
Crveni Krst is located in the central-west part of Niš. It is flat and bordered on the north by the neighborhood of Komren and on the south by Beograd Mala.

== Characteristics ==
The neighborhood is mostly industrial.

== Future development ==
City government reserved the area for industry development.
