= Čamurlija =

Čamurlija Чамурлијa
- Village
- Location within Serbia
- Country: Serbia
- Region: Southern and Eastern Serbia
- District: Nišava
- City: Niš
- Municipality: Crveni Krst
- Time zone: UTC+1 (CET)
  - Summer (DST): UTC+2 (CEST)

Čamurlija is a village situated in Niš municipality, Nišava District in Serbia.
