= Paligrace =

- Village
- Location within Serbia
- Coordinates: 43°27′31″N 21°51′16.8″E
- Country: Serbia
- Region: Southern and Eastern Serbia
- District: Nišava
- City: Niš
- Municipality: Crveni Krst
- Elevation: 1,175 ft (358 m)
- Time zone: UTC+1 (CET)
  - Summer (DST): UTC+2 (CEST)

Paligrace is a village situated in Niš municipality in Serbia.
