= Gornji Komren =

- Village
- Location within Serbia
- Country: Serbia
- Region: Southern and Eastern Serbia
- District: Nišava
- City: Niš
- Municipality: Crveni Krst

Population (2002)
  - Total: 946
- Time zone: UTC+1 (CET)
  - Summer (DST): UTC+2 (CEST)

Gornji Komren is an inhabited settlement in the city municipality of the Red Cross in the area of the city of Nis in Nisava district . It is located at the foot of the hill Winnick, about 5 km from the center of Nis. According to the census of 2002, there were 946 people (according to the census of 1991, there were 722 inhabitants).

== History ==
The village has been an ancient point to a long-time zaseljenost Upper and Lower Komren . Both villages also existed in the Middle Ages. The names of the villages and some place names suggest romanovlašku zaseljenost. Turkish census in 1498: 41 homes, 12 bachelors, 4 widow's homes, 1 hasa meadow and duties amounting to 6,272 akčas . According to the Turkish census, nahija Nis from 1516, the city was one of the 111 villages nahija and carried the same name as today, and had 37 houses, 3 widow's household, 7 single households. The village has this data and in connection with the uprising in 1841. The village, with another ten villages, had a fire due to the Serbian-Turkish war in 1876. After the liberation from the Turks, with the gradual strengthening of market impact in the rural economy, which appeared in the late 19th and early 20th Ages decomposition process of family cooperatives and fragmentation of land holdings. In 1895, the village had 42 households and 290 inhabitants and in 1930, it had a population of 56 households and 351 resident.

Immediately after the liberation approached the planned reconstruction of settlements based on the urban plan, so the upper Komren was the first village in the low end, which has received regulatory plan . Construction and renovation of the village started on the basis of the plan, but soon the construction continued spontaneously by the traditional rural beliefs. Since 1960/62, the village has had strengthened the tendency for migration (primarily in settlement Ratko Jovic and in the northwest quadrant of Nis), as well as the orientation of the workers' occupation and a mixed economy with a tendency to retain possession of the village. Since 1965/70, the upper Komren and migration has become attractive for newcomers from distant villages. On this basis, there was a significant economic and social prestrukturalizacija households, as can be seen from the statistics: in 1971, the village had a population of 15 agricultural, 80 mixed and 67 non-agricultural households.

== Demographics ==
In the village of Gornji Komren live 741 adult residents, and the average age is 39.6 years (38.9 for men and 40.3 for women). The village has 290 households, and the average number of members per household is 3.26. This village is largely populated by Serbs (according to the census of 2002).
