= Rujnik =

- Village
- Location in Serbia
- Coordinates: 43°23′31″N 21°52′59″E
- Country: Serbia
- District: Nišava District
- Municipality: Niš
- Time zone: UTC+1 (CET)
  - Summer (DST): UTC+2 (CEST)

Rujnik is a village situated in Niš municipality in Serbia.
