= Donji Komren =

Donji Komren Доњи Комрен
- Village
- Location within Serbia
- Country: Serbia
- Region: Southern and Eastern Serbia
- District: Nišava
- City: Niš
- Municipality: Crveni Krst

Population (2002)
  - Total: 5,725
- Time zone: UTC+1 (CET)
  - Summer (DST): UTC+2 (CEST)

Donji Komren (Lower Komren) is a suburb of Nis in Nisava district, in south-eastern Serbia. Administratively part of the city municipality of the Red Cross. It is located about 4 km north of the city center. According to the census of 2002, there were 5725 people (according to the census of 1991, there were 4919 inhabitants).

== History ==
The village was formed in the Middle Ages. The Turkish census in 1498 recorded the village, under the present name, with 53 houses, 13 bachelors, widows' houses and 2 with duties which amount to 6,894 acres. According to the Turkish census nahija Nis from 1516, the city was one of the 111 villages nahija and carried the same name as today, and had 44 houses, 9 widow's household, 8 single households. In the mid-18th century, the village was Timar Ahmed Zaim. Ahmed was built in the village water mill and use it to challenge the right of peasants to the ground. This country is fictitiously sold to his mother "for over 100 piasters". After her death, the owner declared her grandson Dzeferi-Zaim and in the village of Tor by requesting payment seljka torovine. In the meantime, the decision in Istanbul, Lower Komren as Timar (spahluk) assigned to Mustafa Bazrđanoviću. Mustafa in about 1760. The dispute led to Jafar-Zaim over the rights to the village, which was conducted in Nis, Belgrade and Istanbul. In May 1762. Mustafa year Bazrđanović is a hearing before an imperial court in Constantinople and brought heaven from Donji Komren to testify in his favor. Donjokomrenska paradise on this occasion accompanied by two firman (letters) against Džafir-Zaim. It is not known how this dispute ended, but it is known that Džafir-Zaim, the same age, similarly bought from low nakibulešrafa Said Omar as 1,000 piasters "all the land, meadows and pastures" for 500 piasters "all buildings, gardens, threshing floor "village Hum, then won the case at low kadi počitlučenog the border village of Cerje and zijametskog (spahi) villages Leskovik, so in that approximately be assumed in whose favor the dispute has been resolved and the village of Donji Komren. Among the indigenous villagers in this village lives a tradition that the old community located in Potes Selište. Among the burnt villages in protivturskom uprising in 1841, and the Serbian-Turkish war in 1876, mentions lower Komren. Liberation from the Turks found him as a small village with around thirty zadružnik house. In 1895, it is a small village with 43 households and 272 inhabitants and in 1930, in it are 64 households lived 338 inhabitants. The proximity of Nis and good land encourage the faster development of the village. At the end of the 19th and early 20th Ages ended with the dissolution of family cooperatives and accelerated the process of fragmentation of property. Close to the city contributed to the period between the two world wars market guiding the rural economy, and before the Second World War and employment in the city.

Since 1953/55, we saw a strong shift towards the workers' employment and connecting suburban Lower Komren with Nis. This connection is made via Settlements Ratko Jovic, whose initial shape along Hum times in the period 1960/70. called the New Komren. During 1970/80. the increased settlement Ratko Jovic allow the physical connection of Nis and the Lower Komren. At this time the Lower Komren lost the character of a traditional village and the village was transformed into a peripheral niche. The older part of the village is divided into two small (upper and lower), while new Naseljski parts given names to some of their specificities: chauffeur settlement Rujnička settlement, etc. Montenegrin village. The largest part of the Lower Komren resettlement has emerged on the east side Humskog stream. The process of the new organization of the Lower Komren has spontaneously (wild) and in most of the rural way; delayed a planned urban development has had serious difficulties in terms of rehabilitation and efficient organization of space. The largest number of immigrants in the early post-war phase ( in 1955 - one thousand nine hundred seventy ) was from the village from its hinterland ( Rujnik, Hum, Cow, wellhead ), and in the next phase ( 1970 - 1980 ) from different areas. According to census data, in this settlement are in 1971 . she lived 33 agricultural, 106 mixed and 638 non-agricultural households.

== Demographics ==
In the village of Donji Komren has 4456 adult residents and the average age is 36.8 years (36.8 for men and 36.9 for women). The village has 1858 households and average number of people per household is 3.08 . This village is largely populated by Serbs (according to 2002 census ), and in the last three censuses, there was an increase in the population.
