= List of cities and towns in Serbia =

Cities in Serbia

This is the list of cities and towns in Serbia. According to data from the 2022 census, Serbia has one city with over 1 million inhabitants, 3 other cities with more than 100,000 inhabitants, 14 cities with a population between 50,000 and 100,000, 47 towns with a population between 10,000 and 50,000, and 56 towns with a population of less than 10,000.

Cities are usually urban centers of territory with the city administrative status, while towns are urban centers of territory with the municipality administrative status. The administrative territory with the city status usually has more than 50,000 inhabitants, but is otherwise very similar to a municipality which usually has on its territory less than 50,000 inhabitants. The administrative area of city or municipality is composed of a city/town proper (urban area) and surrounding villages (rural area): e.g., the administrative area of the City of Subotica is composed of the Subotica city proper and surrounding villages. There are exceptions to this rule, however, since there are dozens of municipalities that are composed only of villages i.e. they don't have any settlement designated as urban by the Statistical Institute of Serbia.

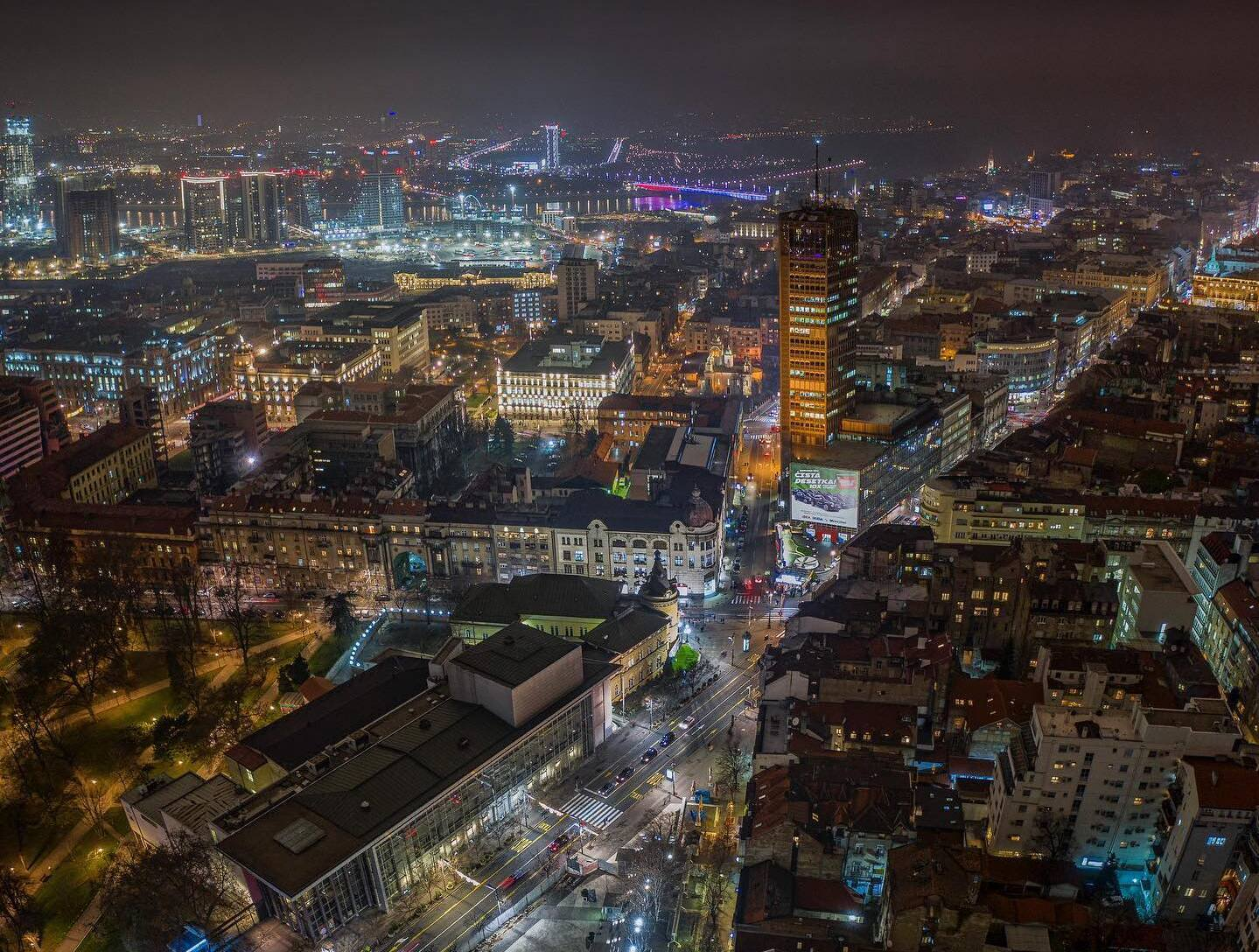
Belgrade

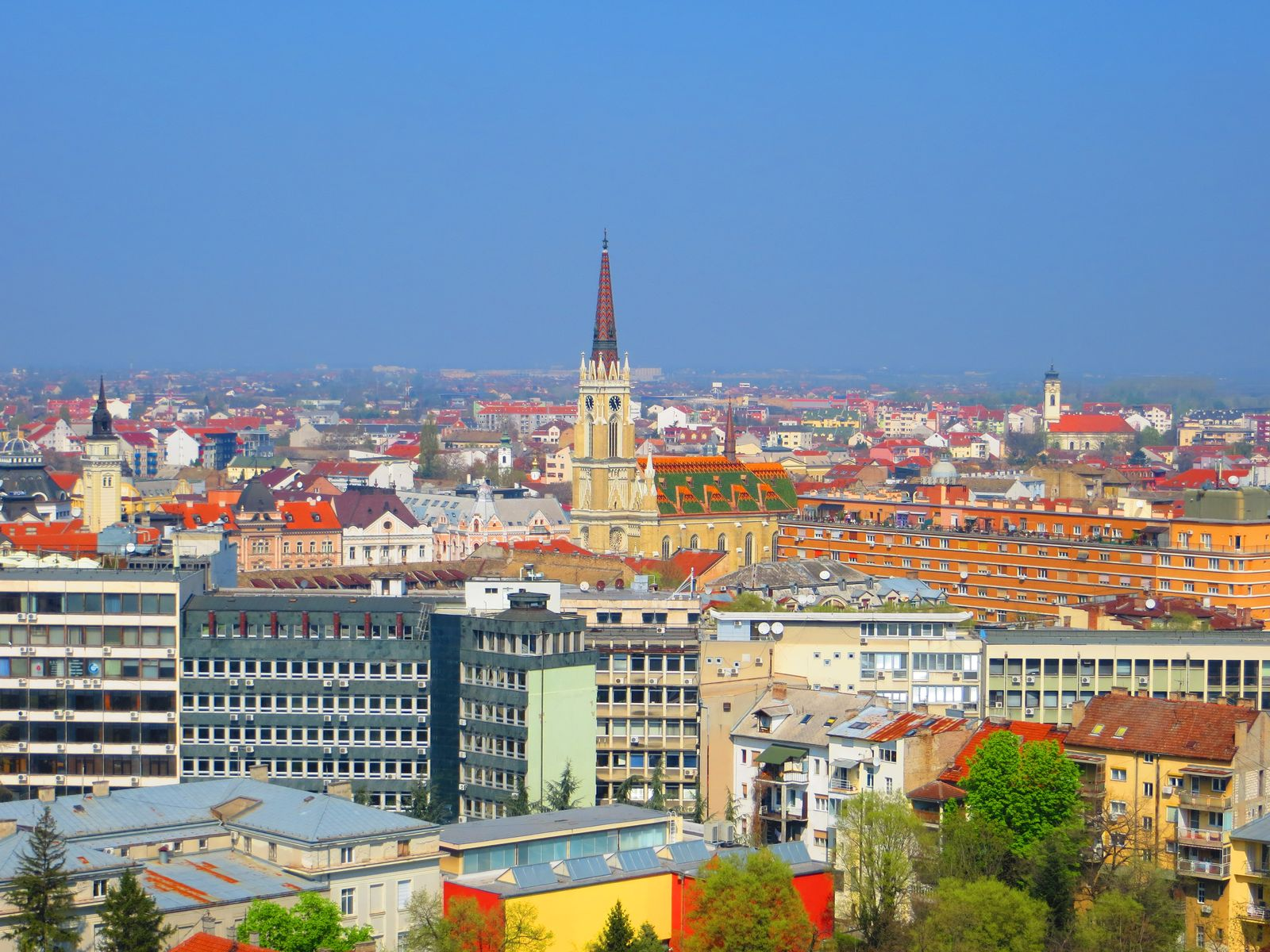
Novi Sad

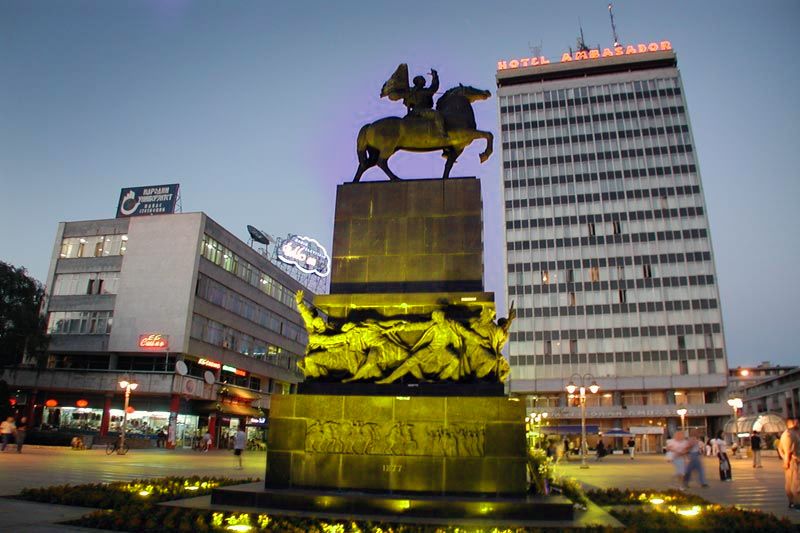
Niš

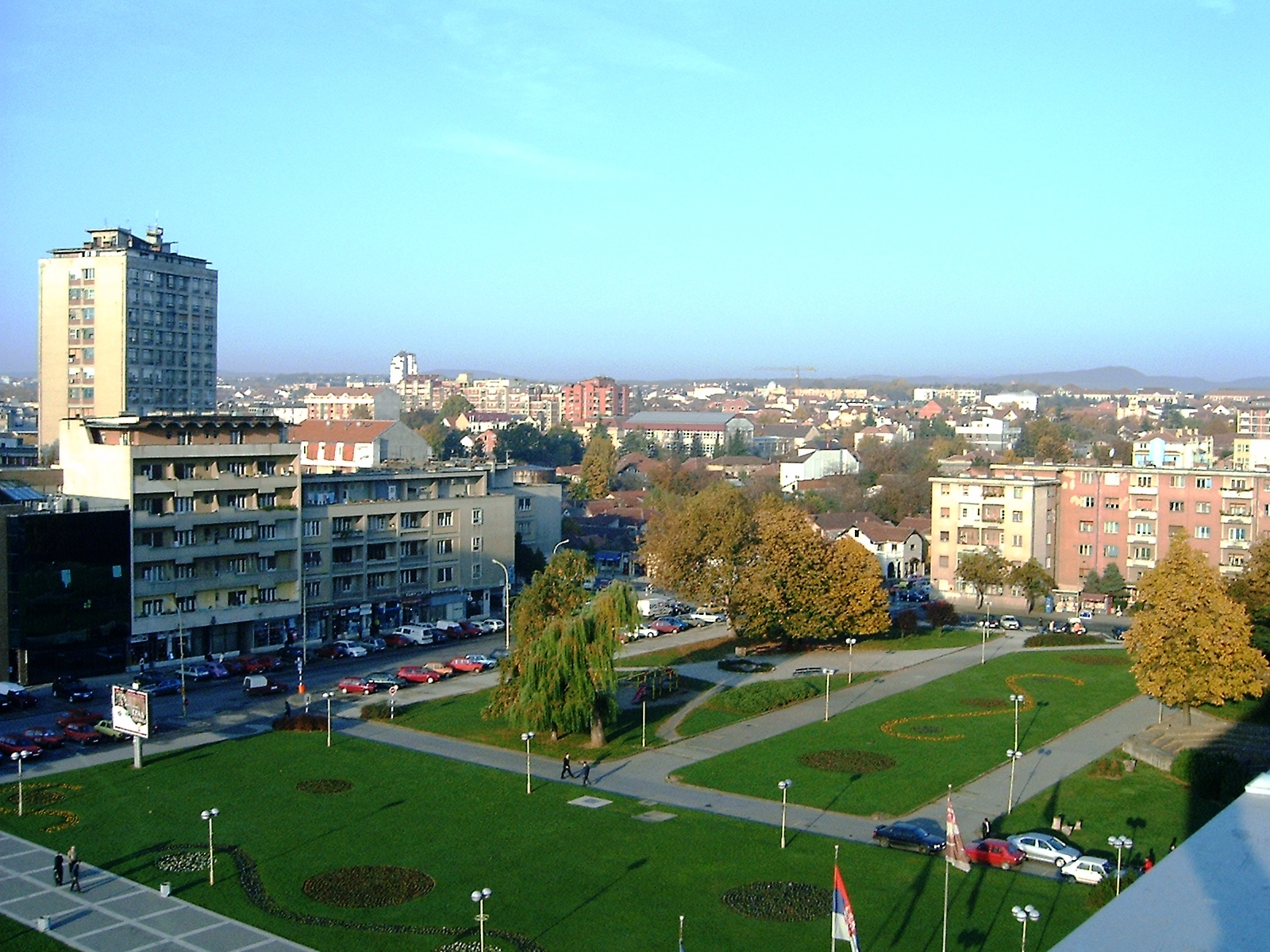
Kragujevac

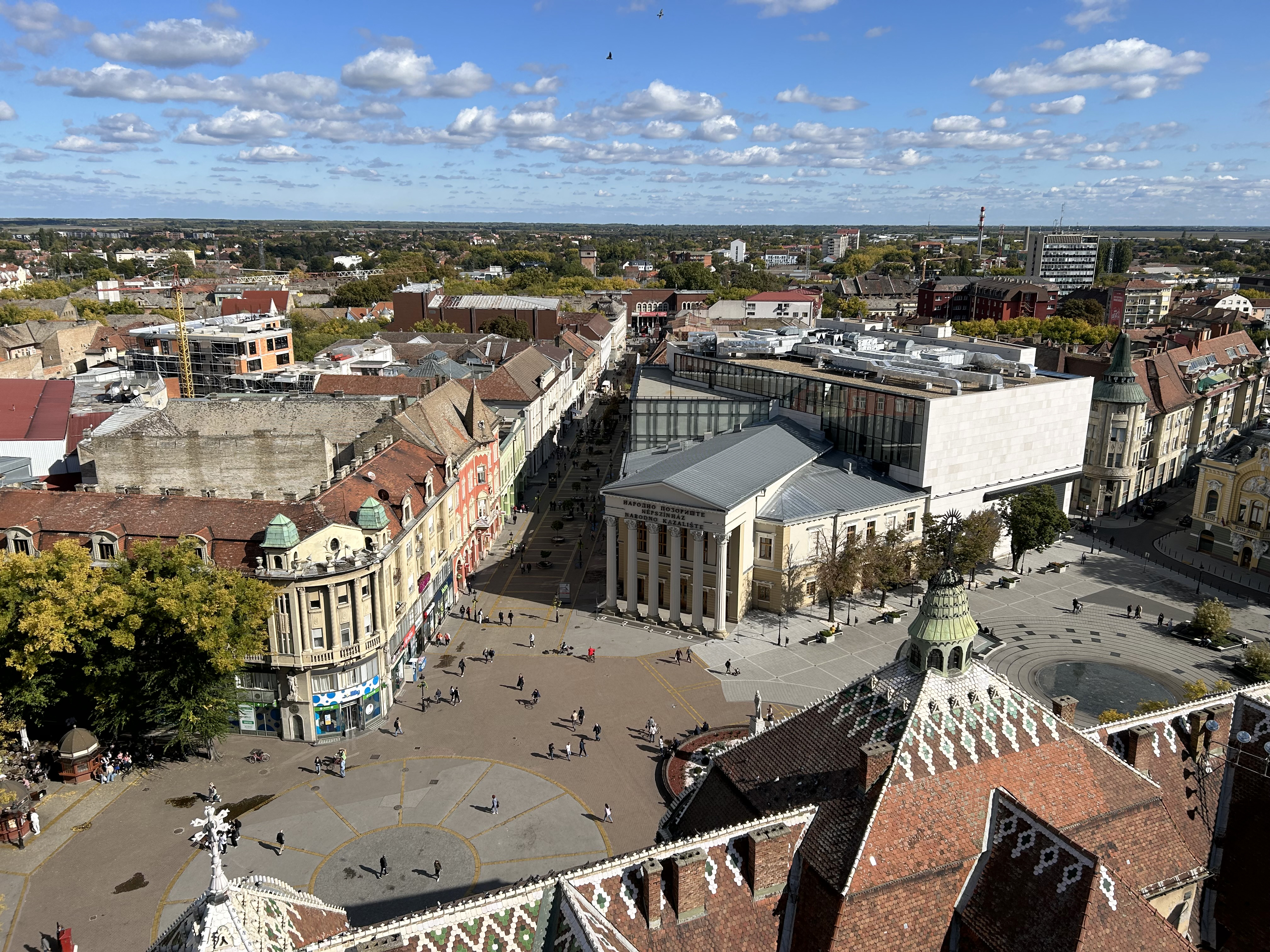
Subotica

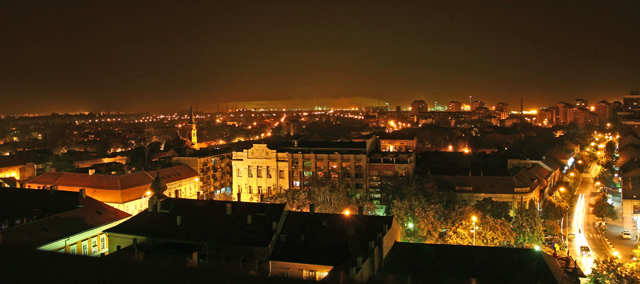
Pančevo

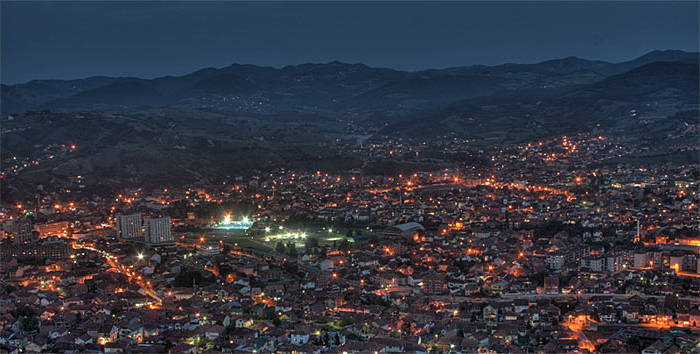
Novi Pazar

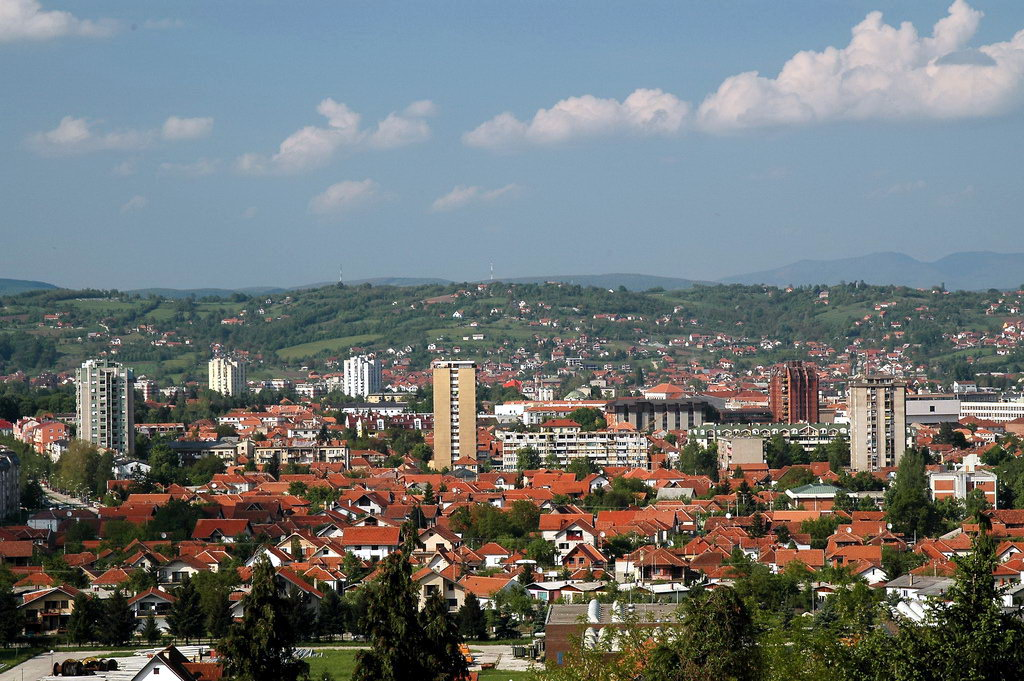
Čačak

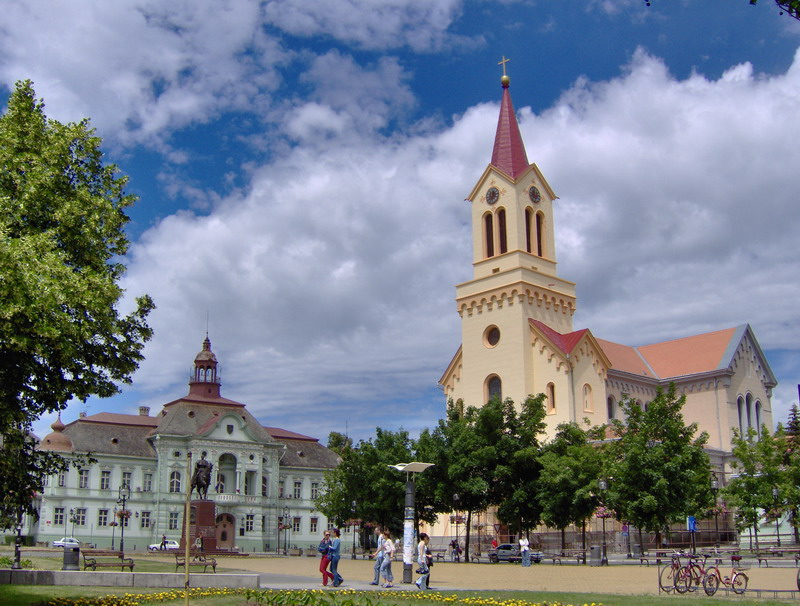
Zrenjanin

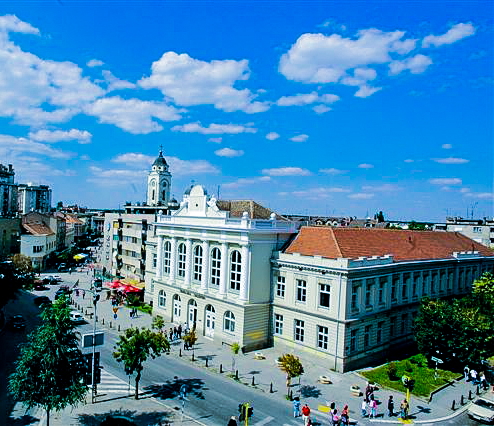
Smederevo

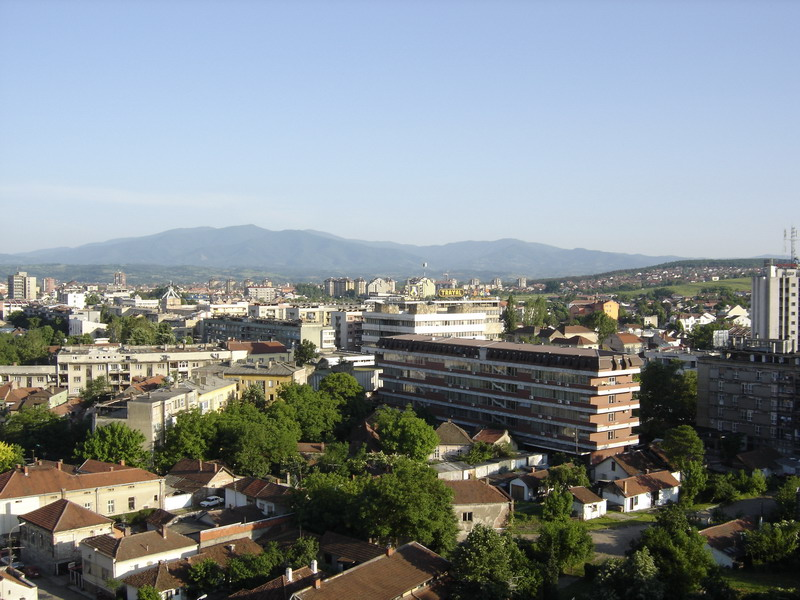
Kruševac

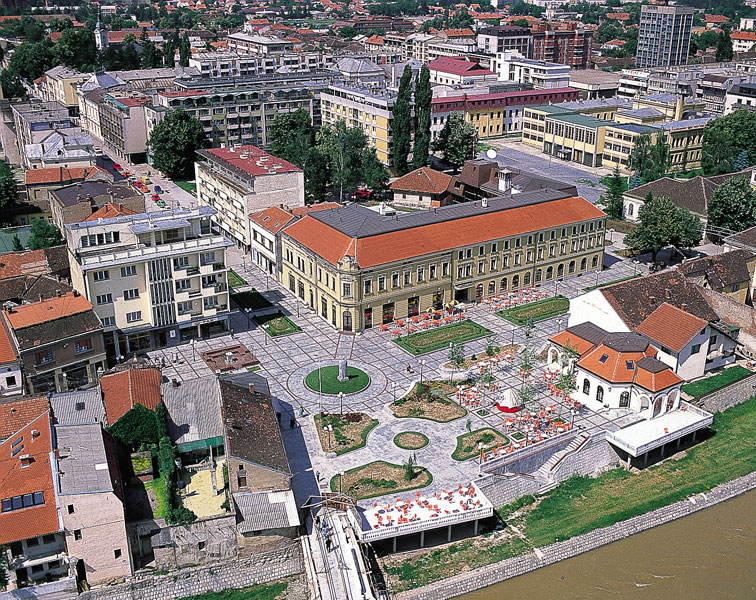
Valjevo

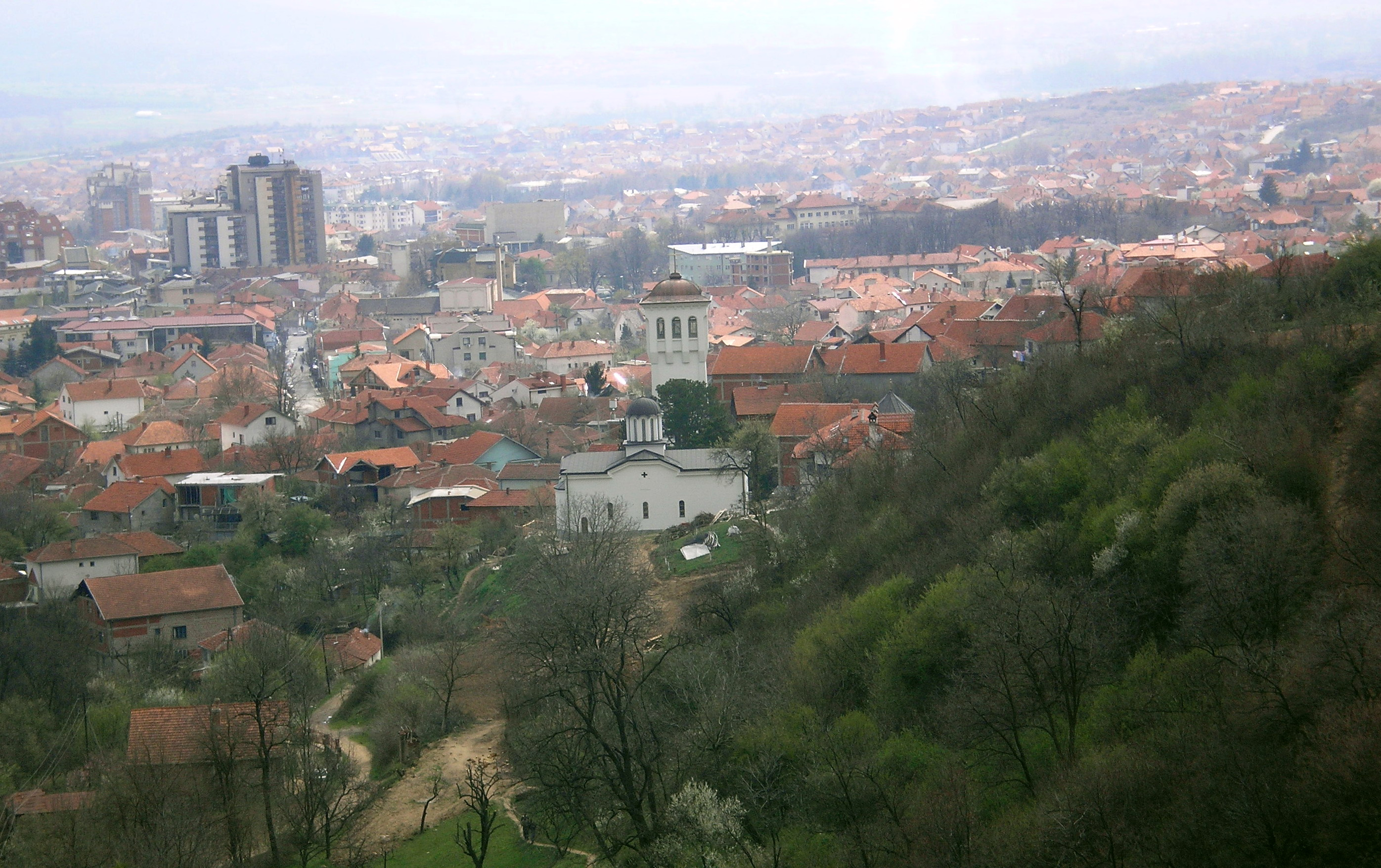
Vranje

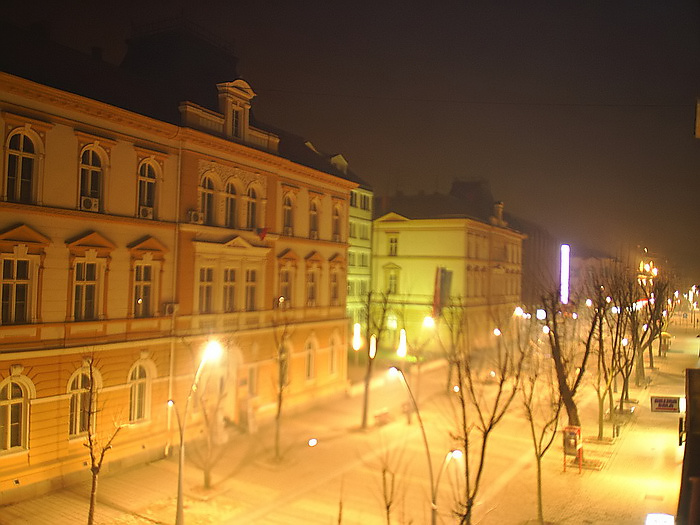
Šabac

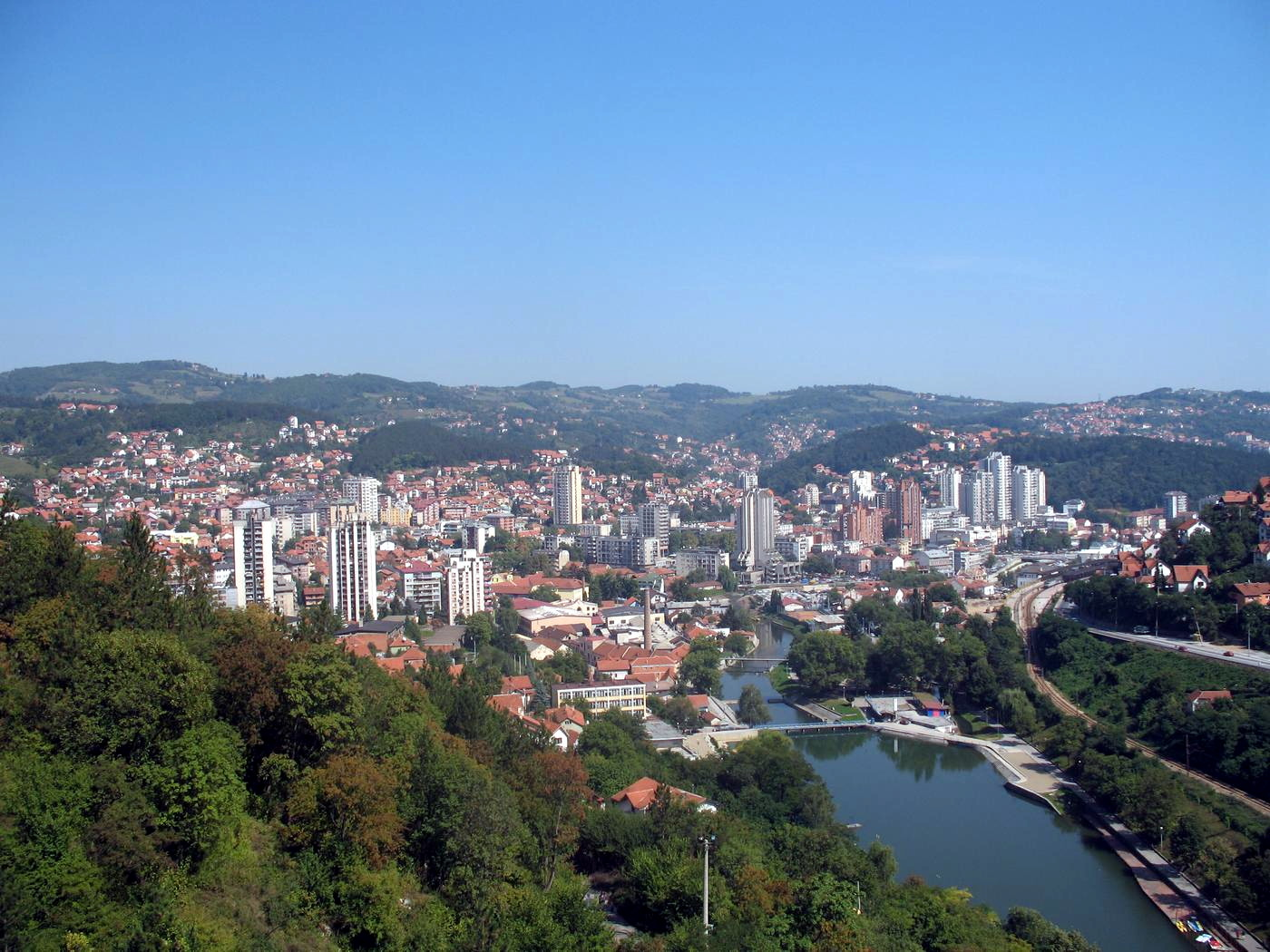
Užice

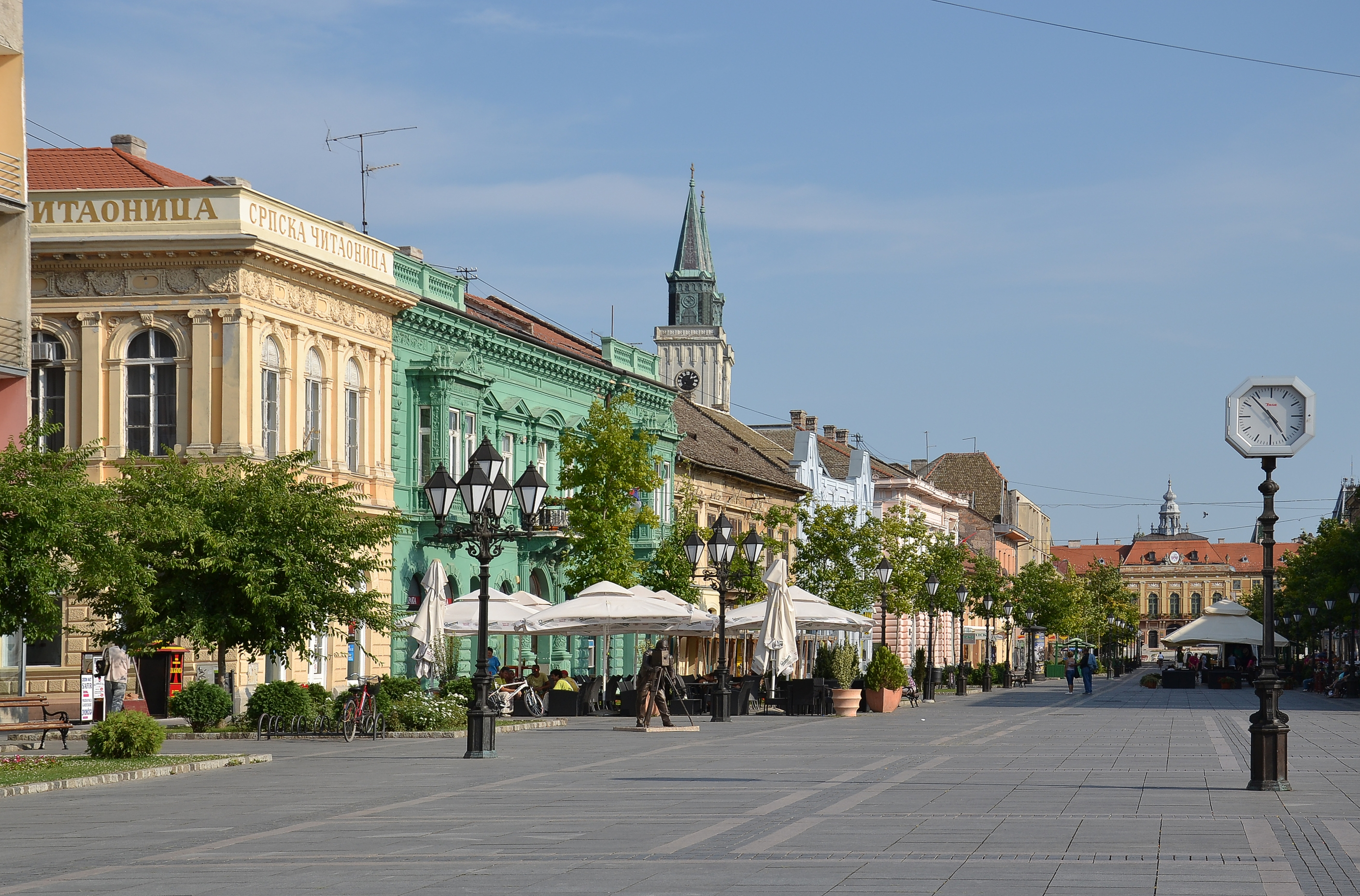
Sombor

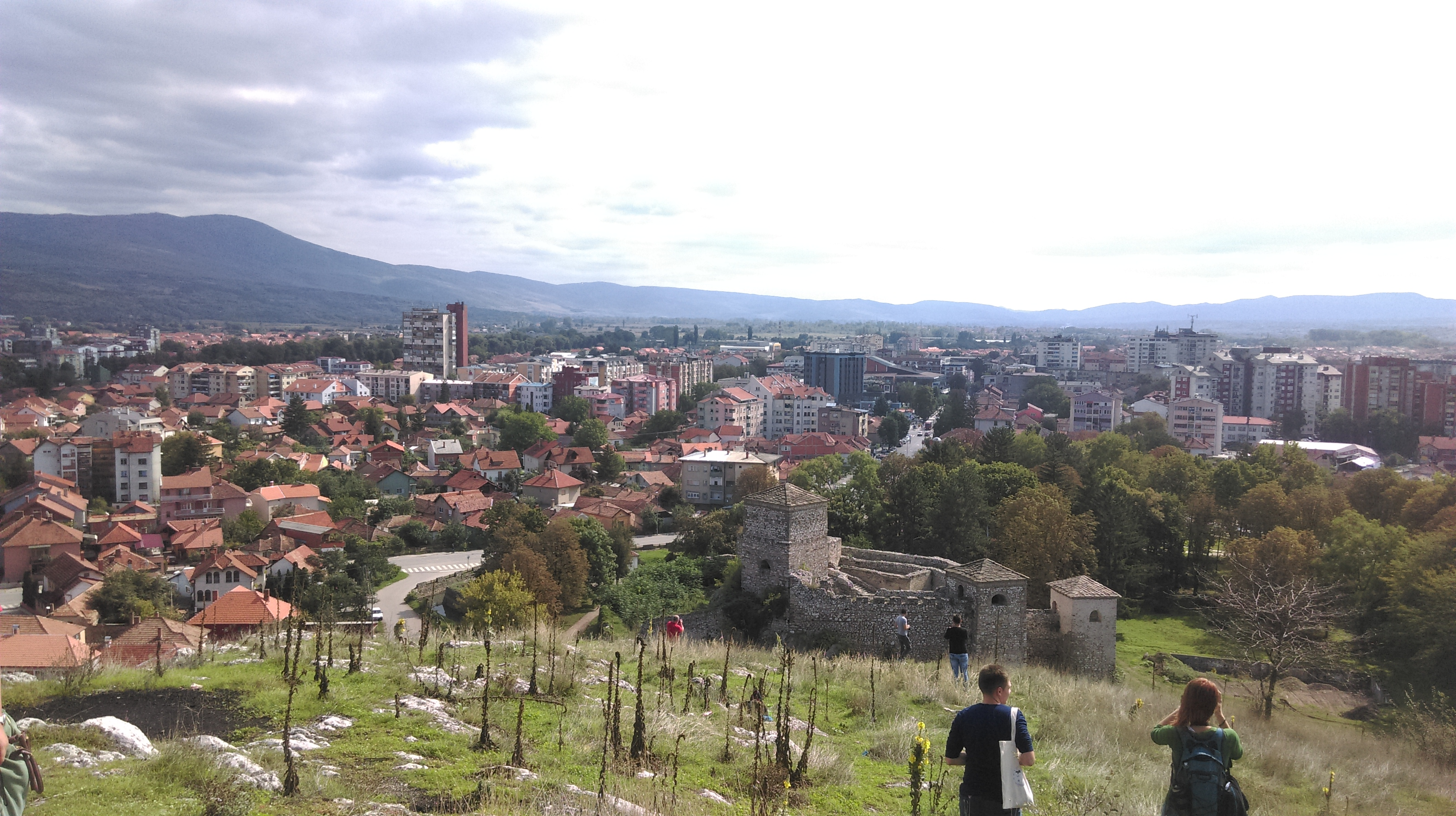
Pirot

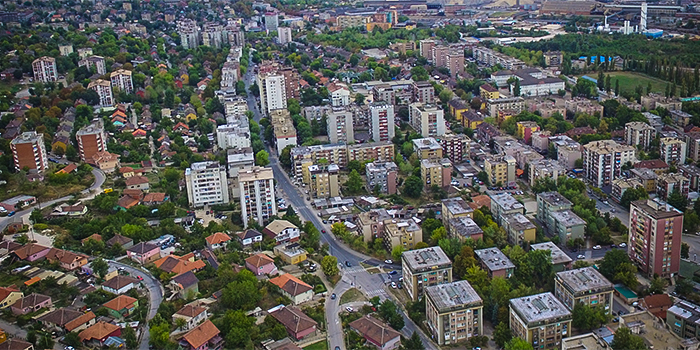
Bor

The Administrative area column in the table lists total population within the administrative boundaries of the city or municipality, meaning that the figure besides urban city/town proper includes villages located within administrative boundaries. In contrast, the City/town proper column lists only population of the main city/town proper of the city/municipality, without the smaller settlements which administratively belong to the city/municipality, or in case of two largest cities, Belgrade and Novi Sad, contiguous urban area that includes city proper and adjacent settlements. Cities are shown in bold; administrative centers of districts are marked with "¤"; municipalities that doesn't have urban settlements (i.e. towns) are marked with "-" in the City / town proper column.

| City / Municipality | District | Administrative area | City / town proper |
|---|---|---|---|
| **Belgrade** ¤ | Belgrade | 1,681,405 | 1,197,114 (Note: Population of the contiguous urban area of Belgrade (including adjacent settlements of Borča, Kaluđerica, and Surčin) stands at 1,298,661.) |
| **Novi Sad** ¤ | South Bačka | 368,967 | 260,438 (Note: Population of the contiguous urban area of Novi Sad (including adjacent settlements of Petrovaradin, Sremska Kamenica, Veternik, and Futog) stands at 325,511.) |
| **Niš** ¤ | Nišava | 249,501 | 178,976 |
| **Kragujevac** ¤ | Šumadija | 171,186 | 146,315 |
| **Subotica** ¤ | North Bačka | 123,952 | 88,752 |
| **Leskovac** ¤ | Jablanica | 123,950 | 58,338 |
| **Pančevo** ¤ | South Banat | 115,454 | 73,401 |
| **Kruševac** ¤ | Rasina | 113,582 | 53,746 |
| **Kraljevo** ¤ | Raška | 110,196 | 57,432 |
| **Novi Pazar** | Raška | 106,720 | 71,462 |
| **Zrenjanin** ¤ | Central Banat | 105,722 | 67,129 |
| **Čačak** ¤ | Moravica | 105,612 | 69,598 |
| **Šabac** ¤ | Mačva | 105,432 | 51,163 |
| **Smederevo** ¤ | Podunavlje | 97,930 | 59,261 |
| **Valjevo** ¤ | Kolubara | 82,169 | 56,145 |
| **Vranje** ¤ | Pčinja | 74,381 | 55,214 |
| **Sremska Mitrovica** ¤ | Srem | 72,580 | 36,764 |
| **Loznica** | Mačva | 72,062 | 19,515 |
| **Sombor** ¤ | West Bačka | 70,818 | 41,814 |
| **Užice** ¤ | Zlatibor | 69,997 | 48,539 |
| **Požarevac** ¤ | Braničevo | 68,648 | 42,530 |
| **Jagodina** ¤ | Pomoravlje | 64,644 | 34,892 |
| Stara Pazova | Srem | 62,318 | 18,522 |
| **Pirot** ¤ | Pirot | 49,601 | 34,942 |
| **Kikinda** ¤ | North Banat | 49,326 | 32,084 |
| Ruma | Srem | 48,621 | 27,747 |
| Bačka Palanka | South Bačka | 48,265 | 25,476 |
| **Zaječar** ¤ | Zaječar | 47,991 | 32,448 |
| Paraćin | Pomoravlje | 45,543 | 22,349 |
| **Vršac** | South Banat | 45,462 | 31,946 |
| Inđija | Srem | 43,443 | 24,450 |
| Aleksinac | Nišava | 43,098 | 15,607 |
| Smederevska Palanka | Podunavlje | 42,192 | 20,345 |
| Aranđelovac | Šumadija | 41,297 | 22,881 |
| Bujanovac | Pčinja | 41,068 | 11,468 |
| **Bor** ¤ | Bor | 40,845 | 28,822 |
| Gornji Milanovac | Moravica | 38,985 | 23,109 |
| **Prokuplje** ¤ | Toplica | 38,054 | 24,627 |
| Vrbas | South Bačka | 36,601 | 20,892 |
| Trstenik | Rasina | 35,875 | 13,476 |
| Kula | West Bačka | 35,592 | 14,873 |
| Velika Plana | Podunavlje | 35,451 | 14,609 |
| Preševo | Pčinja | 33,449 | 13,054 |
| Tutin | Raška | 33,053 | 11,169 |
| Prijepolje | Zlatibor | 32,214 | 11,928 |
| Bečej | South Bačka | 30,681 | 19,492 |
| Negotin | Bor | 28,261 | 14,647 |
| Kovin | South Banat | 28,141 | 11,623 |
| Šid | Srem | 27,894 | 12,618 |
| Ivanjica | Moravica | 27,751 | 11,240 |
| Bačka Topola | North Bačka | 26,228 | 11,930 |
| Požega | Zlatibor | 25,988 | 12,362 |
| Petrovac na Mlavi | Braničevo | 25,900 | 6,958 |
| Temerin | South Bačka | 25,780 | 17,998 |
| Ub | Kolubara | 25,780 | 6,684 |
| Vlasotince | Jablanica | 25,695 | 14,924 |
| Knjaževac | Zaječar | 25,341 | 16,350 |
| Ćuprija | Pomoravlje | 25,325 | 16,522 |
| Vrnjačka Banja | Raška | 25,065 | 9,252 |
| Odžaci | West Bačka | 24,926 | 7,556 |
| Bogatić | Mačva | 24,522 | - |
| Sjenica | Zlatibor | 24,083 | 12,989 |
| Žabalj | South Bačka | 23,853 | 8,449 |
| Bajina Bašta | Zlatibor | 23,533 | 8,971 |
| Priboj | Zlatibor | 23,514 | 13,172 |
| Apatin | West Bačka | 23,155 | 14,613 |
| Aleksandrovac | Rasina | 22,069 | 5,586 |
| Raška | Raška | 21,498 | 8,477 |
| Kovačica | South Banat | 21,178 | 5,398 |
| Kanjiža | North Banat | 20,141 | 8,067 |
| Svilajnac | Pomoravlje | 20,141 | 8,593 |
| Novi Bečej | Central Banat | 19,886 | 10,967 |
| Topola | Šumadija | 19,134 | 4,588 |
| Pećinci | Srem | 18,401 | - |
| Despotovac | Pomoravlje | 18,278 | 5,163 |
| Lebane | Jablanica | 18,119 | 8,025 |
| Senta | North Banat | 17,953 | 14,452 |
| Vladičin Han | Pčinja | 17,532 | 7,343 |
| Kladovo | Bor | 17,435 | 8,817 |
| Alibunar | South Banat | 17,139 | 7,122 |
| Arilje | Zlatibor | 17,063 | 6,639 |
| Surdulica | Pčinja | 16,991 | 9,636 |
| Lučani | Moravica | 16,933 | 4,412 |
| Doljevac | Nišava | 15,837 | - |
| Kuršumlija | Toplica | 15,823 | 11,822 |
| Veliko Gradište | Braničevo | 15,455 | 5,518 |
| Čajetina | Zlatibor | 14,585 | 3,702 |
| Majdanpek | Bor | 14,559 | 8,310 |
| Bela Crkva | South Banat | 14,451 | 7,456 |
| Vladimirci | Mačva | 14,427 | - |
| Krupanj | Mačva | 14,399 | 4,134 |
| Srbobran | South Bačka | 14,357 | 10,496 |
| Varvarin | Rasina | 14,217 | - |
| Titel | South Bačka | 13,984 | 4,522 |
| Beočin | South Bačka | 13,875 | 7,274 |
| Lajkovac | Kolubara | 13,825 | 3,211 |
| Žitorađa | Toplica | 13,782 | - |
| Brus | Rasina | 13,594 | 4,183 |
| Nova Varoš | Zlatibor | 13,507 | 7,542 |
| Žitište | Central Banat | 13,412 | 2,550 |
| Ada | North Banat | 13,293 | 12,281 |
| Sokobanja | Zaječar | 13,199 | 7,188 |
| Ljubovija | Mačva | 12,168 | - |
| Mionica | Kolubara | 12,061 | 1,590 |
| Merošina | Nišava | 11,873 | - |
| Kučevo | Braničevo | 11,806 | 3,313 |
| Knić | Šumadija | 11,729 | - |
| Bački Petrovac | South Bačka | 11,512 | 5,227 |
| Bač | South Bačka | 11,431 | 4,405 |
| Mali Zvornik | Mačva | 11,219 | 4,297 |
| Koceljeva | Mačva | 11,148 | - |
| Svrljig | Nišava | 10,781 | 6,762 |
| Ljig | Kolubara | 10,711 | 3,090 |
| Sečanj | Central Banat | 10,544 | 1,889 |
| Boljevac | Zaječar | 10,184 | 3,802 |
| Kosjerić | Zlatibor | 10,175 | 3,723 |
| Batočina | Šumadija | 10,162 | - |
| Mali Iđoš | North Bačka | 9,983 | - |
| Osečina | Kolubara | 9,951 | - |
| Bela Palanka | Pirot | 9,947 | 7,140 |
| Žagubica | Braničevo | 9,712 | - |
| Blace | Toplica | 9,682 | 4,865 |
| Rača | Šumadija | 9,638 | 2,362 |
| Opovo | South Banat | 9,462 | 4,147 |
| Bojnik | Jablanica | 9,315 | - |
| Irig | Srem | 9,290 | 3,901 |
| Žabari | Braničevo | 9,261 | - |
| Babušnica | Pirot | 9,109 | 4,254 |
| Malo Crniće | Braničevo | 8,986 | - |
| Plandište | South Banat | 8,957 | - |
| Novi Kneževac | North Banat | 8,627 | 5,688 |
| Čoka | North Banat | 8,556 | 3,119 |
| Nova Crnja | Central Banat | 8,147 | - |
| Rekovac | Pomoravlje | 8,116 | - |
| Dimitrovgrad | Pirot | 8,043 | 5,188 |
| Sremski Karlovci | South Bačka | 7,872 | 7,872 |
| Ćićevac | Rasina | 7,860 | 3,902 |
| Ražanj | Nišava | 7,010 | - |
| Golubac | Braničevo | 6,599 | - |
| Lapovo | Šumadija | 6,582 | 6,057 |
| Medveđa | Jablanica | 6,360 | 2,993 |
| Bosilegrad | Pčinja | 6,065 | 2,348 |
| Gadžin Han | Nišava | 5,850 | - |
| Trgovište | Pčinja | 4,316 | - |
| Crna Trava | Jablanica | 1,063 | - |

Cities and towns in Kosovo

== See also ==
- List of populated places in Serbia
- List of cities, towns and villages in Vojvodina
