= State Road 14 (Serbia) =

Road in Serbia

State Road 14
- Serbian: Državni put IB reda 14; Serbian Cyrillic: Државни пут IБ реда 14

Route information
- Maintained by JP "Putevi Srbije"
- Length: 50.884 km (31.618 mi)

Major junctions
- From: Pančevo E70
- 134 in Kovin; 153 near Smederevo; 156 near Smederevo
- To: Ralja

Location
- Country: Serbia
- Districts: South Banat, Podunavlje

Highway system
- Roads in Serbia; Motorways
← 13	→ 15

State Road 14, is an IB-class road in northern and eastern Serbia, connecting Pančevo with Ralja. It is located in Vojvodina and Southern and Eastern Serbia regions.

Before the new road categorization regulation given in 2013, the route wore the following names: M 24 (before 2012) / 22 (after 2012).

The existing route is a main road with two traffic lanes. By the valid Space Plan of Republic of Serbia the road is not planned for upgrading to motorway, and is expected to be conditioned in its current state.

== Sections ==
Section number	Length	Distance	Section name
01401	28.857 km (17.931 mi)	28.857 km (17.931 mi)	Pančevo (Kovin) – Kovin (Bela Crkva)
01402	7.683 km (4.774 mi)	36.540 km (22.705 mi)	Kovin (Bela Crkva) – Vojvodina border (Kovin)
01403	10.077 km (6.262 mi)	46.617 km (28.966 mi)	Vojvodina border (Kovin) – Smederevo (Radinac)
01404	3.394 km (2.109 mi)	50.011 km (31.075 mi)	Smederevo (Radinac) – Ralja
01405	0.873 km (0.542 mi)	50.884 km (31.618 mi)	Ralja – Ralja
Temporary section until the construction of Bavanište bypass
01499	4.280 km (2.659 mi)		Bavanište (entrance) – Bavanište (exit)

== See also ==
- Roads in Serbia
- National Road (M)1.10
