= Ralja =

Ralja can refer to several locations in Serbia:

- Ralja (Sopot), a village in the city municipality of Sopot, city of Belgrade
- Ralja (Smederevo), a village in the city of Smederevo

or:

- Ralja (river)
