= National road =

National road or National route may refer to:

== Classes of road ==
- Argentina, see List of highways in Argentina
- Australia, see Highways in Australia § National Routes and Highways
- Belgium, see List of national roads in Belgium
- Democratic Republic of the Congo, see Transport in the Democratic Republic of the Congo § highways
- Route nationale, a trunk road in France
- Ghana, see Roads in Ghana § National routes
- Greece, see National roads in Greece
- Iceland, Roads in Iceland
- Indonesia, see Transport in Indonesia § national routes
- Ireland,
  - National primary road, a road classification in Ireland
  - National secondary road, a category of road in Ireland
- Japan, see National highways of Japan
- Morocco, see Transport in Morocco § Roads
- Oman, see National roads in Oman
- Paraguay, see Transport in Paraguay § Roads
- National roads in Poland
- Portugal, see Roads in Portugal
- Senegal, see Transport in Senegal § national roads
- National routes in South Africa
- National highways of South Korea
- Spain, see List of national roads in Spain
- Swedish national road
- National Road, in the United States
- Vietnam, see Transport in Vietnam § Road transport

== Specific roads ==
=== Serbia ===
- National Road (M)1 (Serbia)
- National Road (M)1.9 (Serbia)
- National Road (M)1.10 (Serbia)
- National Road (M)1.11 (Serbia)

=== United States ===
- National Road or Cumberland Road, a historic road in the United States
- National Road (Cambridge, Ohio) or Peacock Road, a historic road in the United States

== Other uses ==
- National road (South Africa) (SANRAL)
- National Roads Authority, in Ireland
- National Roads Company of Israel

== See also ==
- N road (disambiguation)
- National Highway (disambiguation)
- State road
