= Ralja (river) =

Ralja (Раља)
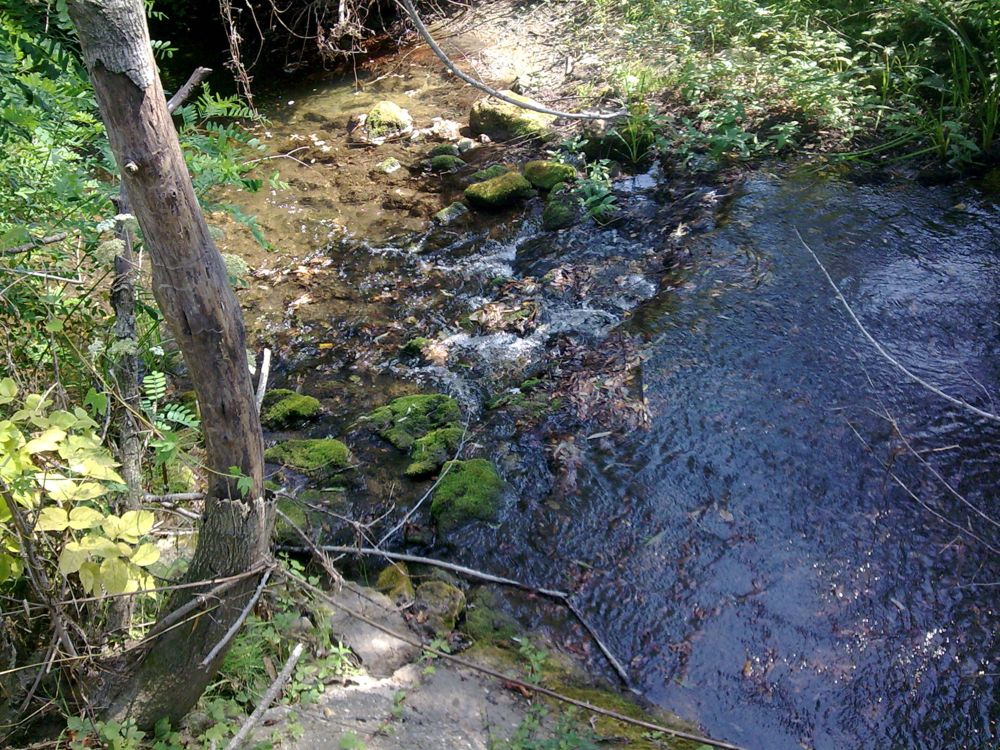
- River Ralja near the village of Ralja (Smederevo)

Location
- Country: Serbia

Physical characteristics
- Source
  - location: Kosmaj mountain, west of Velika Ivanča
- Mouth
  - location: Jezava, at Radinac
  - coordinates: 44.6145°N 20.9886°E
- Length: 51 km (32 mi)
- Basin size: 310 km^{2} (120 sq mi)

Basin features
- Progression: Jezava→ Great Morava→ Danube→ Black Sea

The Ralja (Serbian Cyrillic: Раља) is a river in the Šumadija region of Serbia. It is a 51 km long left tributary to the Jezava, a distributary of the Great Morava river. It also gives its name to the surrounding Šumadija's subregion of Ralja.

== Course ==
The Ralja originates in the northern part of the Kosmaj mountain, north of the village of Velika Ivanča, in the Sopot municipality of the City of Belgrade. Almost from the source, the river valley is a route for the Belgrade-Niš railway. At the villages of Popović and Mali Požarevac, the Ralja turns straight to the east for the rest of its flow and also from this point, the Belgrade-Niš highway joins the railroad.

As it flows next to the Belgrade suburbs of Dražanj, Umčari and Živkovac, the Ralja divides the Podunavlje region from the Ralja region of the low Šumadija, and leaves the City of Belgrade area at the village of Malo Orašje. After the villages of Binovac, Kolari, Vrbovac and Ralja, the river separates from the highway turning north at the village of Vranovo and empties into the one of several arms of the Jezava at Smederevo's suburb of Radinac.

== Characteristics ==
The Ralja drains an area of 310 km², belongs to the Black Sea drainage basin, and is not navigable.

In July 2021, city announced that project for flash flood warning system is being applied on several rivers and streams on the territory of Belgrade, including the watershed of Ralja. Hydrological stations and rain gauges will be placed to monitor the water level. Ralja is known as relatively small stream, which however floods the surroundings during the heavy rains. By March 2023 three hydrologocal stations were placed along the river, at Dražanj, Umčari and Živkovac, while the fourth was placed at the confluence of the Kamendol creek.

In the lower section, Ralja is even more polluted, as there it receives the discharge canal of the Smederevo Ironworks wastewaters. Measurements from October 2021 and August 2022 showed high and prohibited levels of cadmium, lead, copper and zinc in river's mud. The water is completely red in this section.

== See also ==
- Rivers in Serbia

== Sources ==
- Mala Prosvetina Enciklopedija, Third edition (1985); Prosveta; ISBN 86-07-00001-2
- Jovan Đ. Marković (1990): Enciklopedijski geografski leksikon Jugoslavije; Svjetlost-Sarajevo; ISBN 86-01-02651-6
