= Tanja Savić =

Serbian singer (born 1985)

- Тања Савић
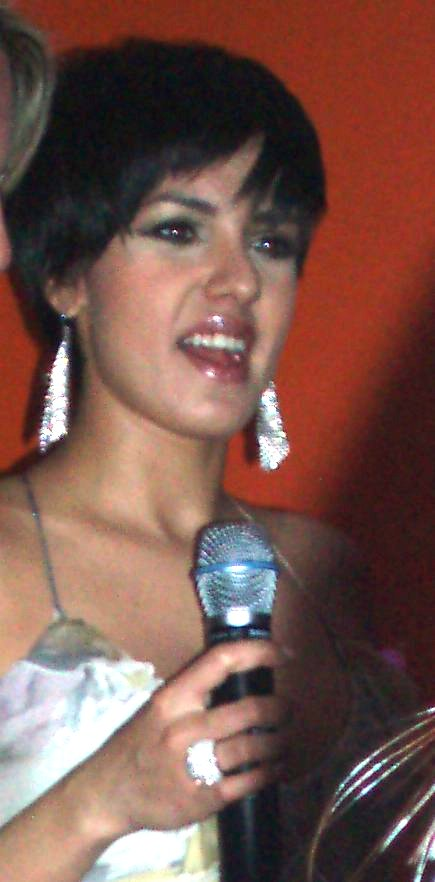
- Savić in 2010
- Born: 20 March 1985 (age 41); Radinac, SR Serbia, SFR Yugoslavia
- Occupation: Singer
- Years active: 2003–present
- Spouse: Dušan Jovančević (m. 2011; div. 2021)
- Children: 2
- Musical career
- Genres: Pop-folk; turbo-folk; dance-pop
- Instrument: Vocals
- Labels: Grand Production; City Records; IDJTunes; Toxic

Tanja Savić (Serbian Cyrillic: Тања Савић, pronounced [tǎɲa sǎːʋitɕ]) is a Serbian singer. She rose to prominence as a contestant on the singing competition show Zvezde Granda in 2004. Savić has released five studio albums: Tako mlada (2005), Tanja Savić (2008), Sestre po suzama (2009), Stranci (2019) and Lečim se životom (2024).

== Career ==
In 2004, Savić rose to prominence by competing on the first season of the singing competition show Zvezde Granda, where she ultimately placed as the second runner-up. Subsequently, she was signed to Grand Production, under which she released her debut album Tako mlada in 2005. The album, which was sold in 100,000 copies, spawned popular songs like "Tako mlada", "Minut ljubavi" and "Zašto me u obraz ljubiš". It was followed by the self-titled album in 2008 and Sestre po suzama in 2009, which included hit songs "Zlatnik", "Gde ljubav putuje" and "Sestre po suzama". Additionally, her songs "Suknjica" and "Gde ljubav putuje" were featured in the movies Guča! (2006) and Srpski ožiljci (2009), respectively.

In 2014, Savić participated in the second season of the competition show Tvoje lice zvuči poznato, winning in the ninth episode as Rihanna. After facing career setbacks due to living in Australia, Savić managed to revive her popularity by collaborating with rappers Corona and Rimski on the single "Oči boje viskija", released in November 2017. She continued working with the duo on her commercially successful EP Stranci, which was released in December 2019 through IDJTunes.

Upon the release of her fourth studio album, Lečim se životom, through Toxic Entertainment in June 2024, Savić embarked on her first regional concert tour, which celebrated twenty years of her music career. The first show was held at the Belgrade Arena on November 23, 2024.

== Personal life ==
Savić was born on 20 March 1985 in the village of Radinac near Smederevo, SR Serbia, SFR Yugoslavia.

In 2009, having initially met him three years earlier in California, Savić began dating the Queensland-based Serbian-Australian entrepreneur Dušan Jovaničević. The December 2010 birth of the couple's son Maksim precipitated their decision to get married during early 2011. A year later, in June 2012, they had another son, Đorđe.

The couple separated in 2020, followed by a highly-publicized custody battle, in which Savić accused her estranged husband of relocating their children to Australia against her will. In March 2021, she was reunited with her sons after almost a year of separation.

== Discography ==
=== Studio albums ===
List of studio albums, showing release date, label and track listing
Title	Details	Notes
Tako mlada	Released: 16 June 2005; Label: Grand Production; Format: CD, cassette, digital download, streaming	Track listing: | No. | Title | Length | |---|---|---| | 1. | "Tako mlada" | 3:54 | | 2. | "Kao brodovi" | 3:10 | | 3. | "Zašto me u obraz ljubiš" | 3:29 | | 4. | "Minut ljubavi" | 4:12 | | 5. | "Stani tugo" | 3:26 | | 6. | "Igračka" | 3:35 | | 7. | "U godini jedan dan" (featuring Darko Filipović) | 2:51 | | 8. | "Za moje dobro" | 3:59 | | Total length: | | 28:36 |
Tanja Savić	Released: June 2008; Label: Grand Production; Format: CD, digital download, streaming	Track listing: | No. | Title | Length | |---|---|---| | 1. | "Da, da" | 3:35 | | 2. | "Crveno slovo" | 3:15 | | 3. | "Ulica" | 3:30 | | 4. | "Kad pronađeš moj lik" | 3:35 | | 5. | "Zlatnik" | 3:40 | | 6. | "Potpis moj" | 3:28 | | 7. | "Alo mama" | 3:08 | | 8. | "Porok" | 3:50 | | Total length: | | 28:11 |
Sestre po suzama	Released: 24 December 2009; Label: Grand Production; Format: CD, digital download, streaming	Track listing: | No. | Title | Length | |---|---|---| | 1. | "Sestre po suzama" | 4:09 | | 2. | "Nova godina" | 4:03 | | 3. | "Da, to sam ja" | 3:39 | | 4. | "Van dometa" | 3:21 | | 5. | "Kameleon" | 4:48 | | 6. | "Mrak" | 3:36 | | 7. | "Tako mi i treba" | 2:50 | | 8. | "Gde ljubav putuje" | 4:02 | | Total length: | | 30:28 |
Stranci	Released: 4 December 2019; Label: IDJTunes; Format: CD, digital download, streaming	Track listing: Digital edition | No. | Title | Length | |---|---|---| | 1. | "Za ljubav nisi" | 3:39 | | 2. | "Hitna pomoć" | 3:39 | | 3. | "Laga laga" (featuring Corona) | 2:49 | | 4. | "Osuđeni na bol" | 3:09 | | 5. | "Bye Bye" (featuring Rimski) | 3:27 | | 6. | "Stranci" | 3:55 | | Total length: | | 20:38 | CD edition | No. | Title | Length | |---|---|---| | 7. | "Oči boje viskija" (featuring Corona and Rimski) | 2:59 | | 8. | "Zločin bez dokaza" (featuring Corona and Rimski) | 3:05 | | 9. | "Soba zablude" | 3:32 | | 10. | "Pogrešna adresa" | 3:06 | | Total length: | | 33:20 |
Lečim se životom	Released: 8 June 2024; Label: Toxic Entertainment; Format: Memory stick, digital download, streaming	Track listing: | No. | Title | Length | |---|---|---| | 1. | "Lečim se životom" | 3:48 | | 2. | "Otac suzama mojim" | 3:28 | | 3. | "Fanatik" | 4:26 | | 4. | "Brat po alkoholu" | 2:40 | | 5. | "Takva mi karma" | 4:01 | | 6. | "Mastilo" | 3:12 | | 7. | "Maštam" | 3:13 | | 8. | "Zavoli me" | 2:35 | | 9. | "Pesma protiv uroka" | 3:40 | | 10. | "Dve nevolje" (featuring Bane Bojanić) | 3:14 | | Total length: | | 34:17 |

=== Compilation albums ===
List of compilation albums, showing release date and label
Title	Details
Best of Tanja Savić	Released: 2010; Label: Grand Production; Format: CD, digital download, streaming
Best of Tanja Savić	Released: 2017; Label: Grand Production; Format: 2×CD, digital download, streaming
Grand dame 3 (with Rada Manojlović and Milica Pavlović)	Released: 30 April 2020; Label: Grand Production; Format: 3×CD, digital download, streaming

== Tours ==
- 20 godina sa Tanjom Savić (2024-2026)

== Filmography ==
Filmography of Tanja Savić
Year	Title	Genre	Role	Notes
2003-2004	Zvezde Granda	Television	Herself	Season 1, 3rd place
2014	Tvoje lice zvuči poznato	Television	Herself	Season 2; 8th place

== See also ==
- Music of Serbia
- List of singers from Serbia
- Turbo-folk
