= National Road (M)1.10 (Serbia) =

Road in Serbia

National Road (M)1.10
- Serbian: Magistralni put (M)1.10; Serbian Cyrillic: Магистрални пут (М)1.10
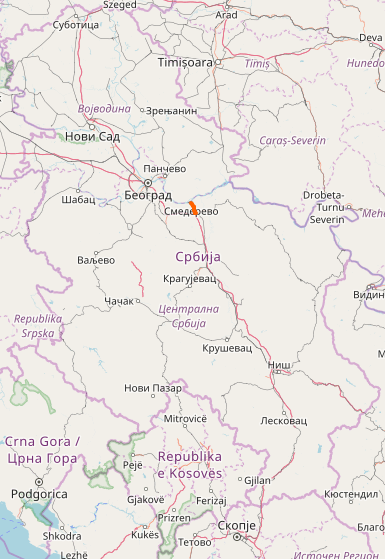

Route information
- Maintained by JP "Putevi Srbije"
- Length: 10.5 km (6.5 mi)

Major junctions
- From: Ralja
- To: Smederevo

Location
- Country: Serbia
- Districts: Podunavlje

Highway system
- Roads in Serbia; Motorways
← M1.9	→ M1.11

National Road 1.10 (alternatively marked as M-1.10, M1.10 and M 1.10), was a road in Serbia, connecting Ralja with Smederevo. After the new road categorization regulation given in 2013, the route wears the name 14, except for the section Radinac – Smederevo 1, which is currently not numbered. The route was a national road with two traffic lanes.

== Sections ==
Section number	Length	Distance	Section name
0045	3.3 km (2.1 mi)	3.3 km (2.1 mi)	Ralja (Smederevo) – Ralja (settlement)
0274	2.5 km (1.6 mi)	5.8 km (3.6 mi)	Ralja (settlement) – Radinac (overlap with)
0047	4.6 km (2.9 mi)	10.4 km (6.5 mi)	Radinac – Smederevo 2
1007	0.1 km (0.062 mi)	10.5 km (6.5 mi)	Smederevo 2 – Smederevo 1

== See also ==
- Roads in Serbia
