= Živkovac =

Coordinates: 44°42′50″N 20°29′52″E

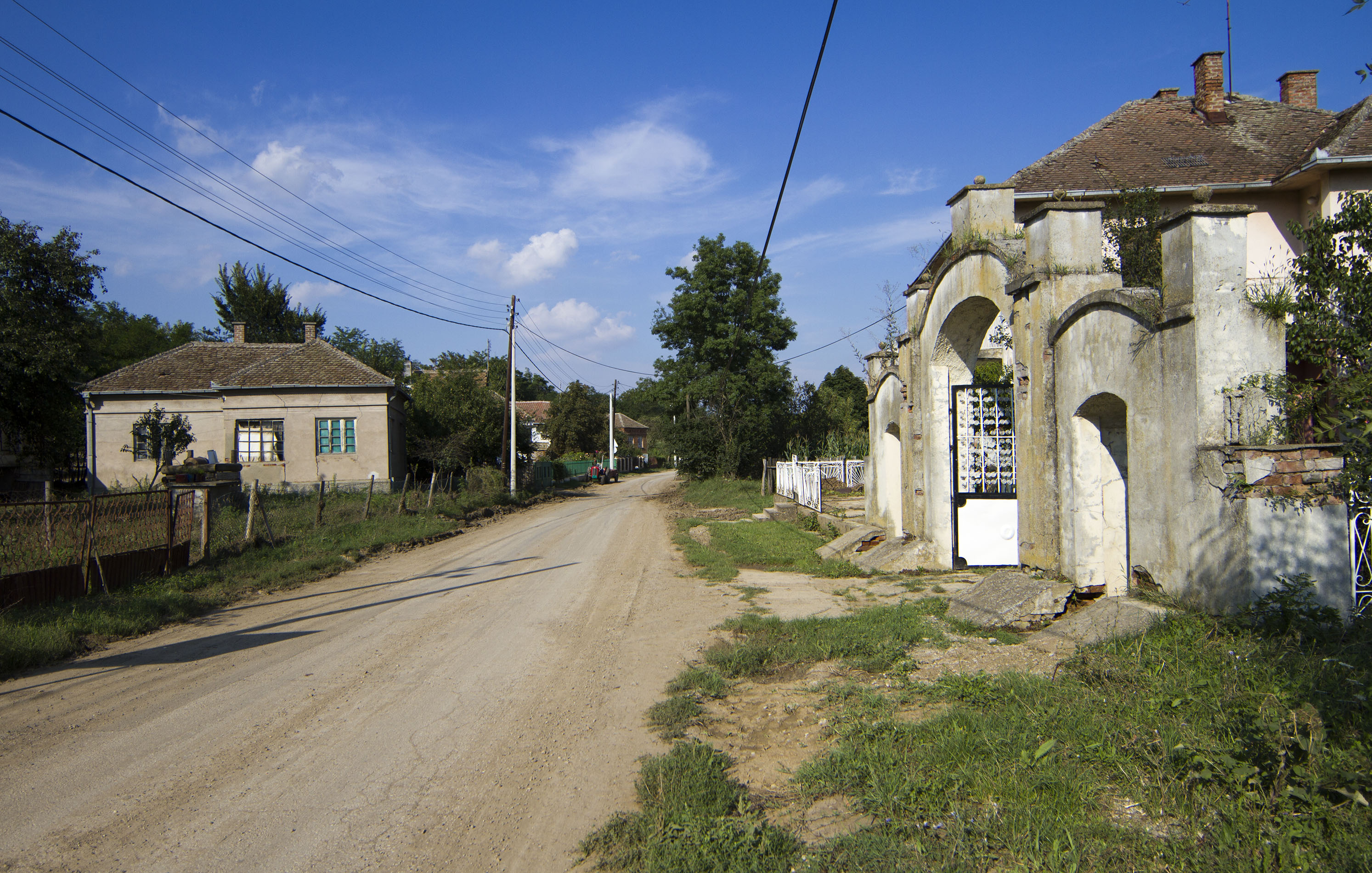
Serbian

Živkovac (Serbian Cyrillic: Живковац) is a suburban settlement of Belgrade, the capital of Serbia. It is located in Belgrade's municipality of Grocka.

Živkovac is located in the northern Šumadija region and it is the easternmost settlement in the municipality and of the City of Belgrade. It is situated on the Ralja river, on both the railway Belgrade-Požarevac and the highway Belgrade-Niš, 44 km southeast of Belgrade and 15 km south of the municipal seat of Grocka.

Živkovac is also the smallest of all settlements in the municipality, with population of 438 in 1991 and 380 in 2002. It is statistically classified as a rural settlement (village) and its economy is solely based on agriculture.
