= Tako mlada =

Studio album by Tanja Savić
- Released: 16 June 2005
- Recorded: 2004–05: Belgrade
- Genre: pop folk
- Label: Grand Production
- Producer: Aleksandar Perišić Romario; Saša Jakšić Žika; Goran Ratković; Bane Opačić

Tanja Savić chronology
Tako mlada (2005)	Tanja Savić (2008)

Singles from Tako mlada
- 1. "Tako mlada" Released: 2005; 2. "Zašto me u obraz ljubiš" Released: 2005; 3. "Minut ljubavi" Released: 2005

Tako mlada (English: So Young) is the debut studio album by Serbian pop-folk singer Tanja Savić. It was released 16 June 2005 through the Belgrade-based record label Grand Production.

== Background ==
Tanja Savić became famous in 2004 while competing on the first season of the Zvezde Granda television singing contest and making it into the final six.

== Singles ==
The title song was released as the album's lead single in 2005.

== Track listing ==
No.	Title	Writer(s)	Producer(s)	Length
1.	"Tako mlada" (So Young)	Marina Tucaković	Aleksandar Perišić Romario; Saša Jakšić Žika	3:54
2.	"Kao brodovi" (Like Ships)	Tucaković	Goran Ratković	3:10
3.	"Zašto me u obraz ljubiš" (Why Are You Kissing My Cheek)	Tucaković	Romario; Žika	3:29
4.	"Minut ljubavi" (A Minute of Love)	Tucaković	Romario; Žika	4:12
5.	"Stani tugo" (Stop, Sorrow)	Tucaković	Ratković	3:26
6.	"Igračka" (Toy)	Elvir Uzunović	Žika	3:35
7.	"U godini jedan dan" (One Day In a Year) (featuring Darko Filipović)	Dorijan Šetina	Bane Opačić; Žika	2:51
8.	"Za moje dobro" (For My Good)	Tucaković	Ratković	3:59
