= Smederevo Fortress =

Fortress in Serbia

Coordinates: 44°40′10″N 20°55′40″E

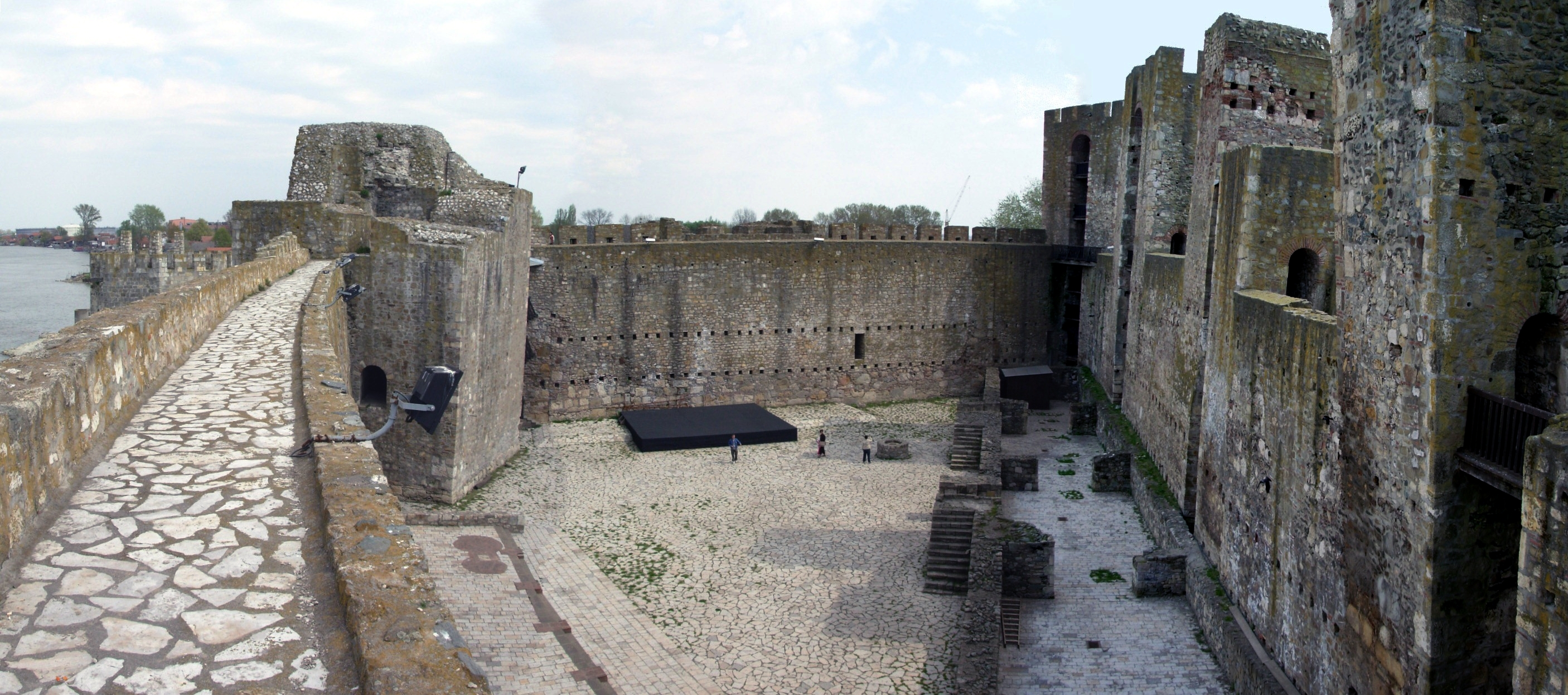
- The inner city
- Interactive map of the Smederevo Fortress area

General information
- Architectural style: Serbo-Byzantine fortification
- Location: Smederevo, Serbia
- Construction started: 1428
- Completed: 1430 (inner city); 1439 (fortified suburb); 1480s (outer defenses) early-18th-century (trenches)
- Client: Đurađ Branković

Technical details
- Size: 11.3 hectares (28 acres)

Cultural Heritage of Serbia
- Type: Cultural Monument of Exceptional Importance
- Designated: 8 October 1946
- Reference no.: SK 538

The Smederevo Fortress (Serbian: Cмeдepeвcκa твpђaвa / Smederevska tvrđava) is a medieval fortified city in Smederevo, Serbia, which was the temporary capital of Serbia in the Middle Ages. It was built between 1427 and 1430 on the order of Despot Đurađ Branković, the ruler of the Serbian Despotate. It was further fortified by the Ottoman Empire, which had taken the city in 1459.

The fortress withstood several sieges by Ottomans, surviving relatively unscathed. During World War II it was heavily damaged by explosions and bombing, despite which the fortress remained "one of the rare preserved courts of medieval Serbian rulers." (Note: See the sign at the entrance to the inner city)

Smederevo Fortress was declared a national Monument of Culture of Exceptional Importance in 1979. In 2010, the fortress was placed on the tentative list for possible nomination as a World Heritage Site (UNESCO).

== Location ==
Smederevo Fortress, 45 kilometers southeast of Belgrade, covers 11.3 hectares in the center of the modern-day city of Smederevo. It is strategically located on the right bank of the Danube river on the triangular plain formed by the confluence of the Danube and Jezava rivers, only 72 meters above sea level. This location allowed the Serbian capital to remain near the Christian Kingdom of Hungary, while also satisfying Sultan Murad II of the Ottoman Empire by eliminating the uncontrolled passage of the Hungarians into the Morava Valley.

The fortress' position connecting the Balkans and Central Europe has made it an important religious and commercial center for centuries, now aided by being on the Pan-European X Corridor. The Danube also connects it to many other historic sites, most notably Belgrade and its suburb of Vinča, Novi Sad, Golubac Fortress, Lepenski Vir and Viminacium.

== History ==
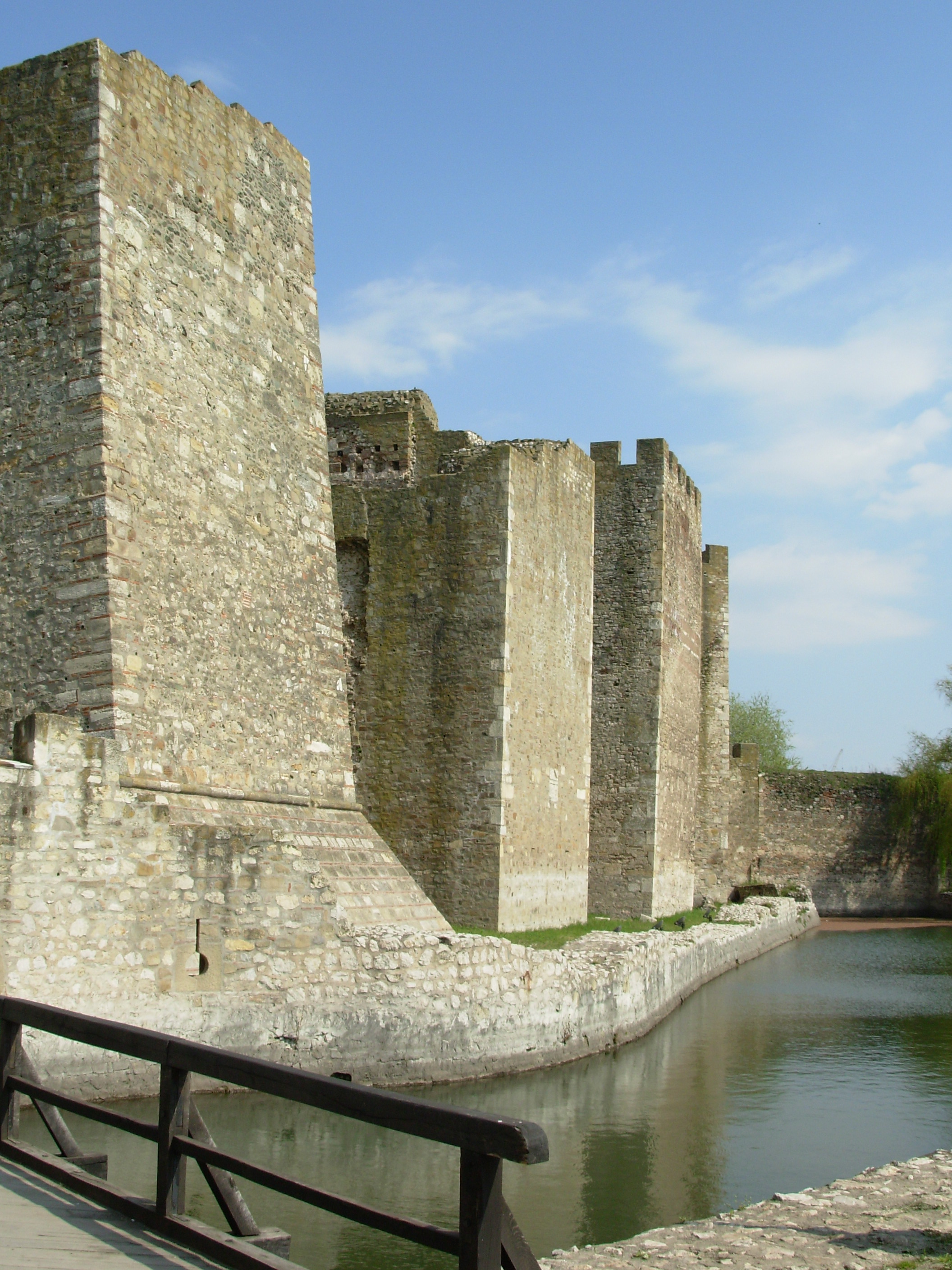
Inner city southern walls and water trench (10)

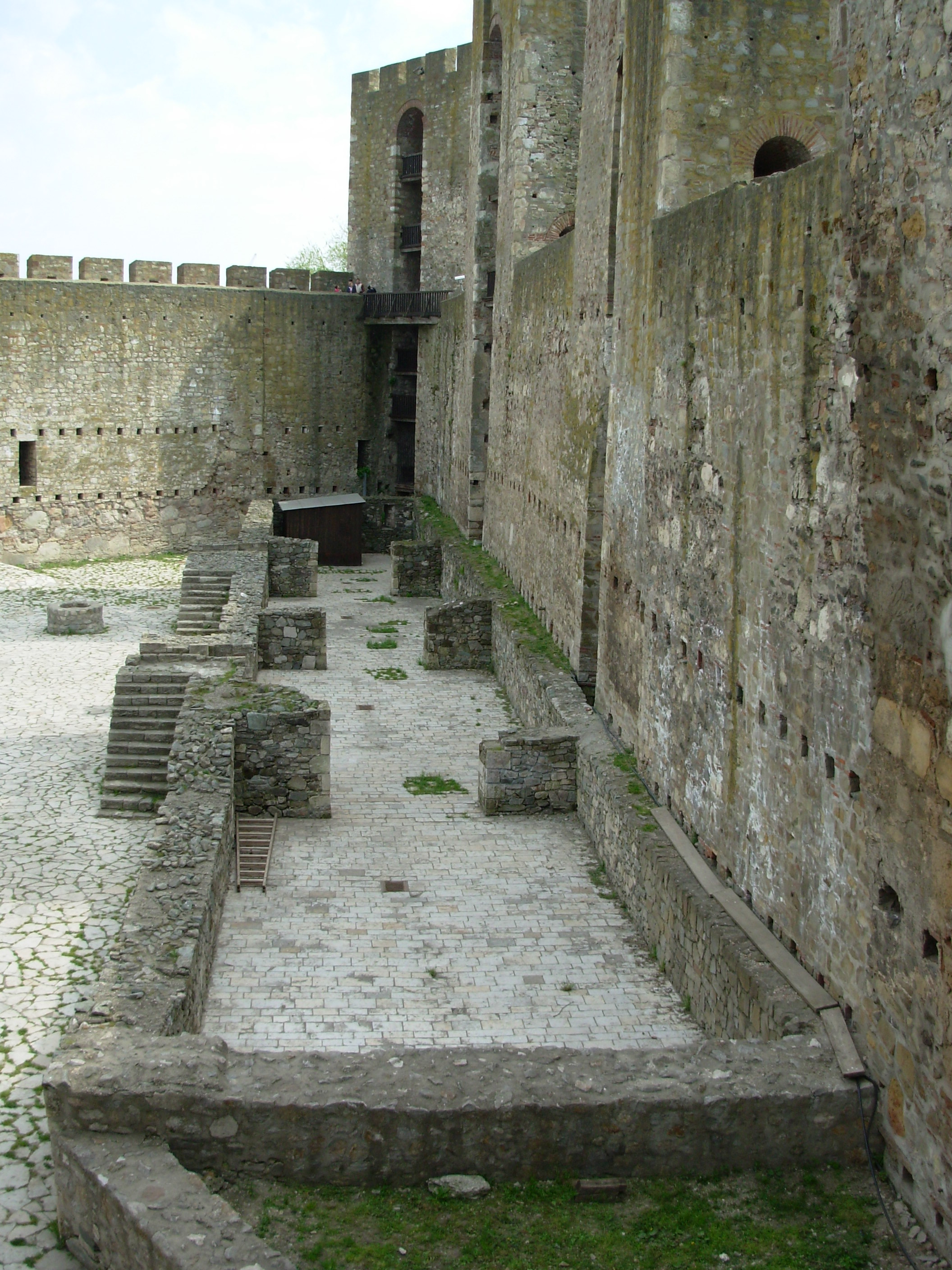
Despot's Palace remains (18)

Amidst the turbulence of the Ottoman conquest of the Balkans in the early 15th century, Despot Stefan Lazarević had to maintain the Serbian Despotate in a delicate balance between the Ottomans and Hungarians. Around 1403, he accepted the Hungarian vassalage from King Sigismund and established the new capital in Belgrade, which was ceded to him as an award. After Stefan's death in 1426, Đurađ Branković, Stefan's nephew and successor, had to return Belgrade to the Hungarians. To compensate for this loss, Đurađ decided to build a new capital, and the choice fell to Smederevo.

Smederevo, which had no prior settlement, was chosen for several reasons. In 1428, during the Ottoman Empire's war with Venice, the Hungarians and Ottomans agreed to recognize Branković as an independent ruler of Serbia, thereby turning it into a buffer state. A contract also established Ottoman overlordship of Serbia, in conjunction with remaining a Hungarian vassal. Between the longer status with Hungary and religious differences with the Ottomans (Hungary and Serbia were Christian, as compared to the Muslim Turks), it was preferred that the capital be closer to Hungary than the Ottoman Empire. Smederevo's location on the Danube, between Belgrade and Golubac, provided easy access to other points along the river. It also allowed the control of Danube traffic, including blocking Hungarian entry into the Morava valley, which satisfied the Turks.

In the fall of 1428, construction of the capital began. In 1430, the first part of the fortress, including a palace and enough other buildings to form an inner city, was completed. Work on a fortified suburb and additional fortifications continued until 1439.

On April 20, 1434, Đurađ Branković's youngest daughter Katarina and Ulrich II of Celje were wed in the new fortress. This marriage stressed the friendly relations the Despot had with the Ottoman Porte, although Ulrich's kinship with the Queen of Hungary implied an increased Serbo-Hungarian alliance. As a result, Vizier Mehmet Saridže-pasha arrived in Smederevo in mid-1434 with a message from Edirne. It stated that Serbia's safety from the Ottoman Empire could only be guaranteed through the marriage of Branković's older daughter to Sultan Murad II. After much deliberation, the council convoked at the palace conceded, and arrangements were made for Mara to be engaged to the Sultan. That autumn, Murad sent several of his "most famous viziers" to retrieve his fiancée.

On August 14, 1435, a formal contract of "brotherhood and friendship" between Serbia and the Republic of Venice was signed in Smederevo's audience hall. This contract resulted in Đurađ and his sons being counted as Venetian citizens. In early June 1439, the peace with the Ottomans, which had been gained through Mara's marriage to the Sultan, was broken. Led by Murad II, 130,000 Turkish soldiers occupied the hills around Smederevo. Branković rushed to Hungary for help, leaving his son Grgur in command. Help was not forthcoming, but Smederevo withstood the attack, even when Murad brought in cannons.

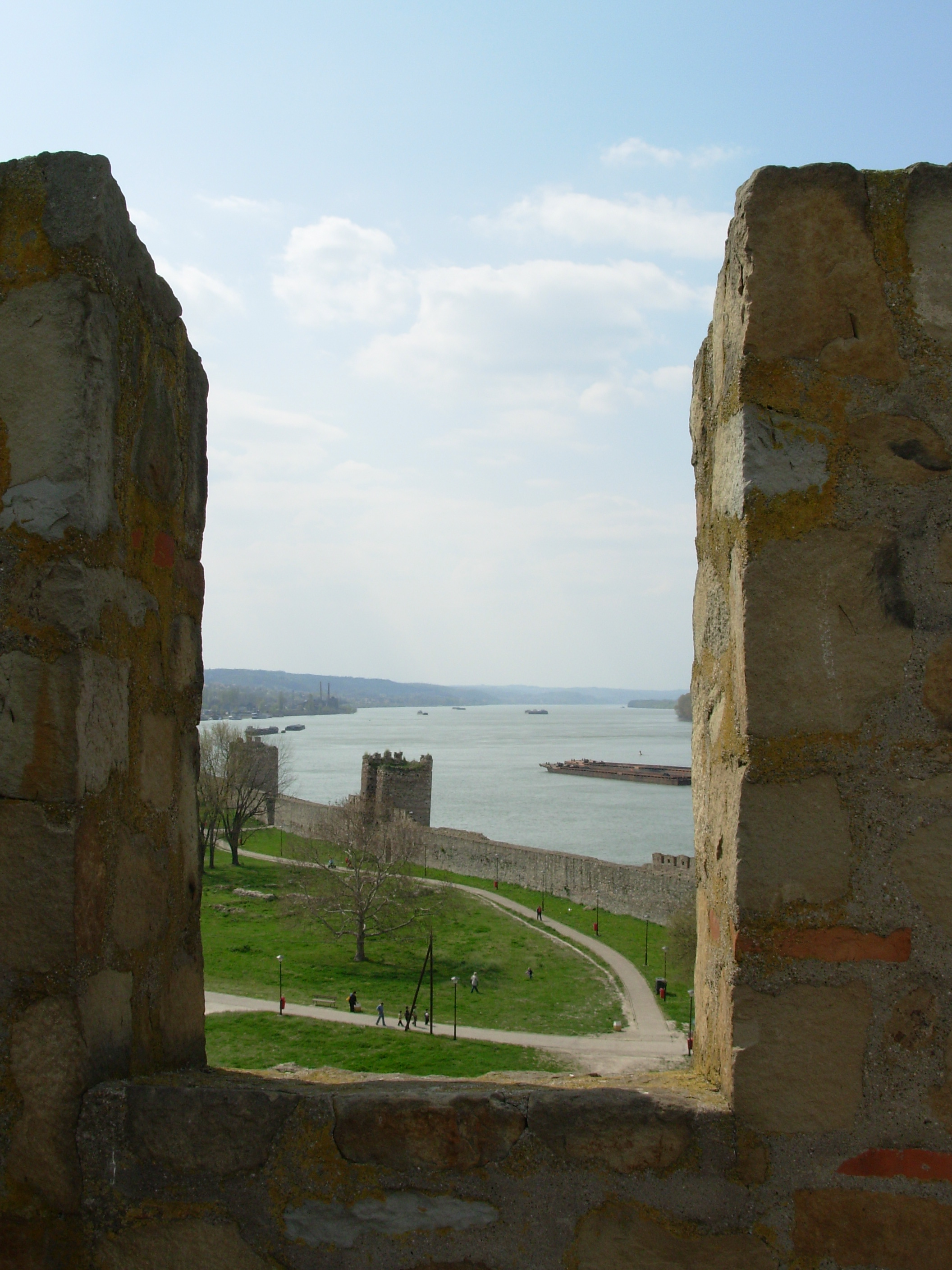
A view to the northern wall and Danube.

Nearly three months later, on August 18, 1439, hunger forced the Serbs to surrender. Princes Grgur and Stefan were sent to Anatolia and blinded, despite the pleas of their sister, now Sultana Mara. Five years later, however, Smederevo, Grgur, and Stefan returned to Branković through the Peace of Szeged.

Smederevo Fortress shortly before the explosion in 1941

Around the beginning of 1449, Branković imprisoned Hungarian regent John Hunyadi in the dungeons of the fortress until he was ransomed by his countrymen. In 1453, Sultan Mehmed II and Isak-bey Arbanazović led another attack on Smederevo as part of a devastating raid on Serbia. The Turks took 50,000 men, women and children during that raid, but Smederevo was well-led by Thomas Kantakouzenos. Despite having only 6,000 men, compared to the Ottomans' 20,000, the city withstood. Mehmed the Conqueror besieged Smederevo for the second time and the fortress was besieged by the Ottomans for the third time in 1456, being defended by Serbian forces. In March 1459, Stephen Tomašević took over command of Smederevo Fortress. That same year, Smederevo was captured by the Ottomans, leading to the end of the medieval Serbian state while Stephen Tomašević fled to Bosnia.

During World War II, German forces used the fortress for ammunition storage. On June 5, 1941, the ammunition exploded, blasting through the entirety of Smederevo and reaching settlements as far as 10 kilometers away. Much of the southern wall of the fortress was destroyed, the nearby railway station, packed with people, was blown away, and most of the buildings in the city were turned into debris. Around 2,500 people died in the explosion, and every other inhabitant was injured or wounded (approximately 5,500). Bombing by the Allies in 1944 caused further damage.

=== Current and future use ===
The fortress is currently used as a city park, and occasionally hosts festivals, concerts, fairs, and other cultural events. A stage has been built in the inner city. To the southeast, the previously open space along the Jezava now has a harbor and a marina. There are also discussions underway to determine compatible future, modernized uses, and to develop projects to restore and rehabilitate the fortress.

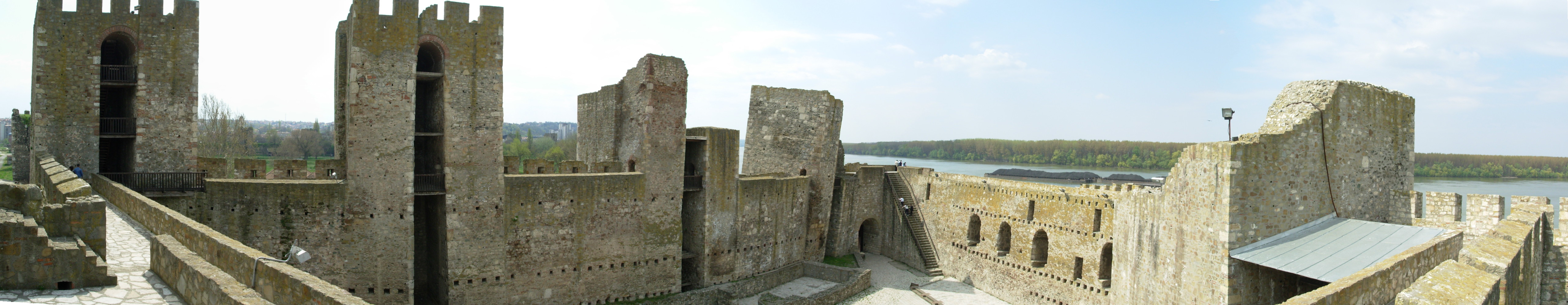
Panoramic view of the Small Town (inner city)

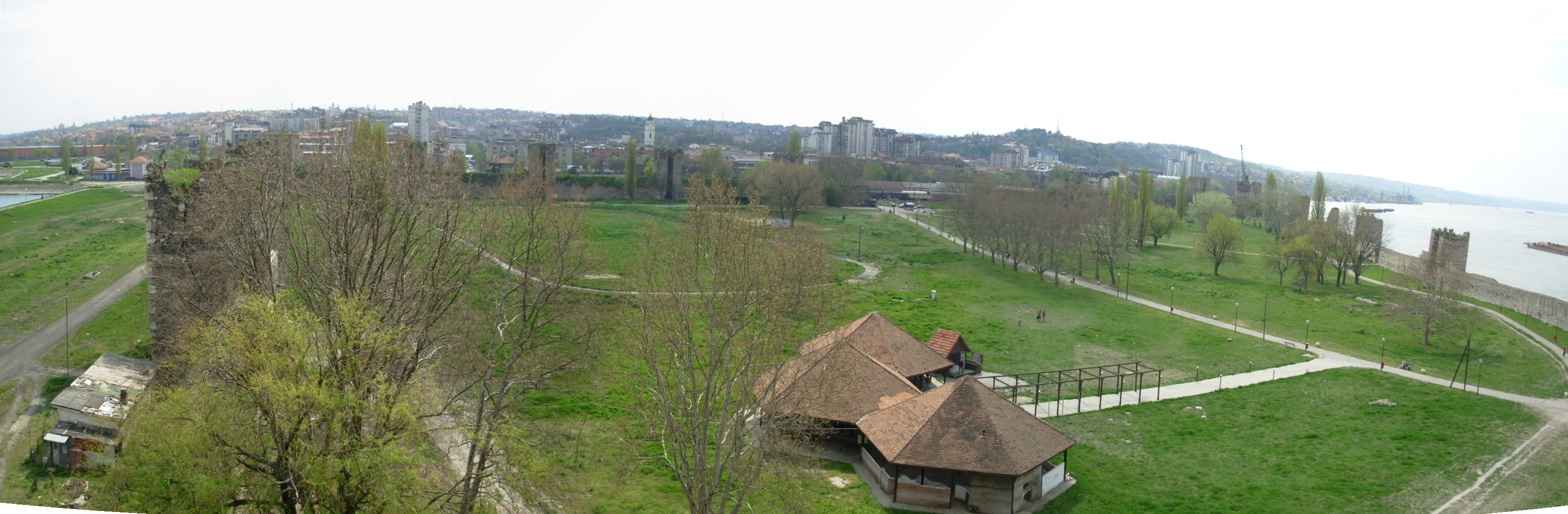
Panoramic view of the Big Town

== Cultural and historical significance ==
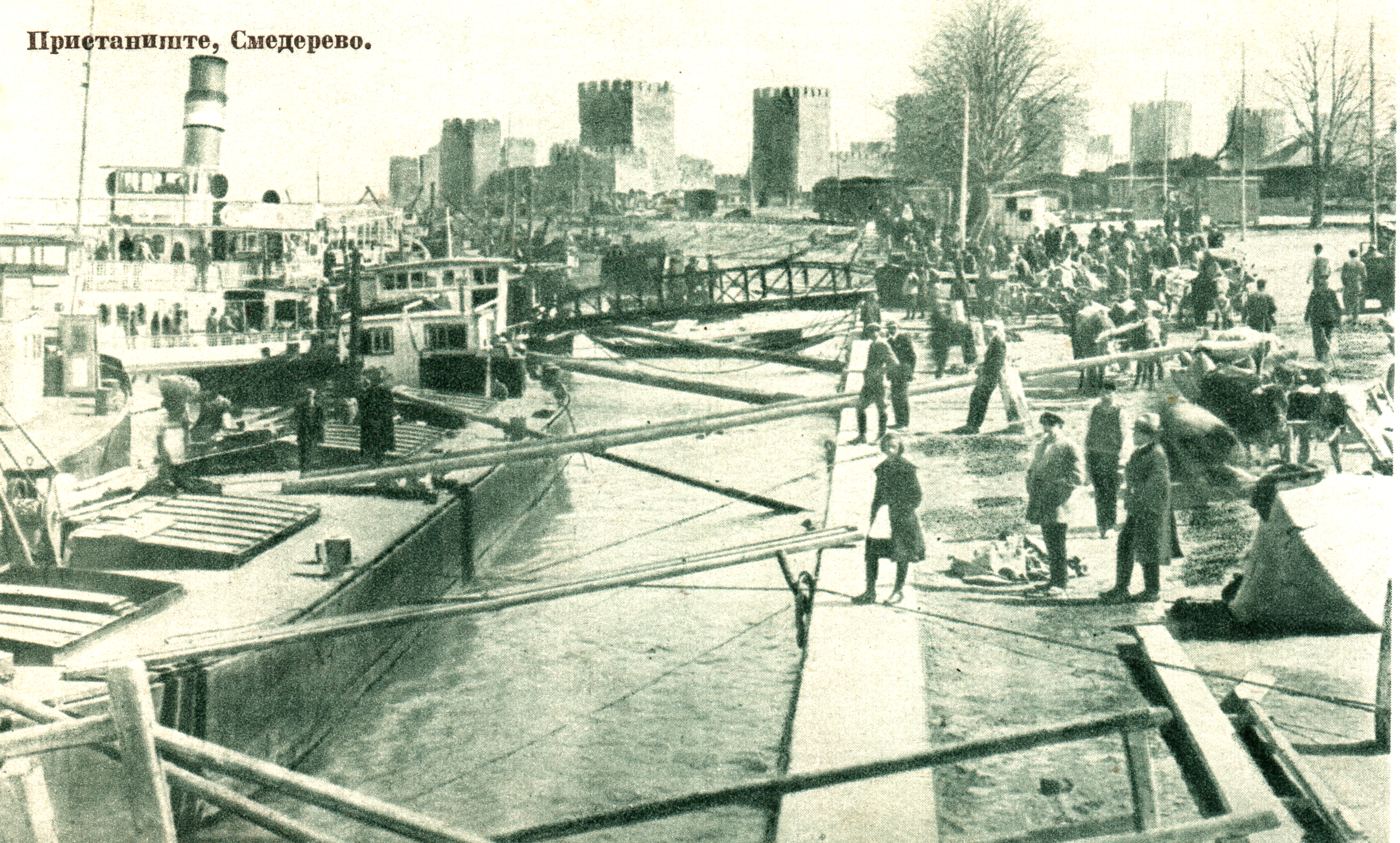
Smederevo Fortress - 1920s

Smederevo Fortress has been described as "one of the most striking and monumental pieces of architecture surviving from medieval Serbia", and "the witness of Serbian creative force." It is an accurate display of traditional medieval defensive architecture and has remained well preserved, suffering no major deterioration until World War II. The fortress and surrounding area have accumulated evidence of the civilizations that developed throughout history, mainly between the 15th and 20th centuries, providing a direct testimony for the progress of the medieval Serbian state and corresponding Orthodox Church.

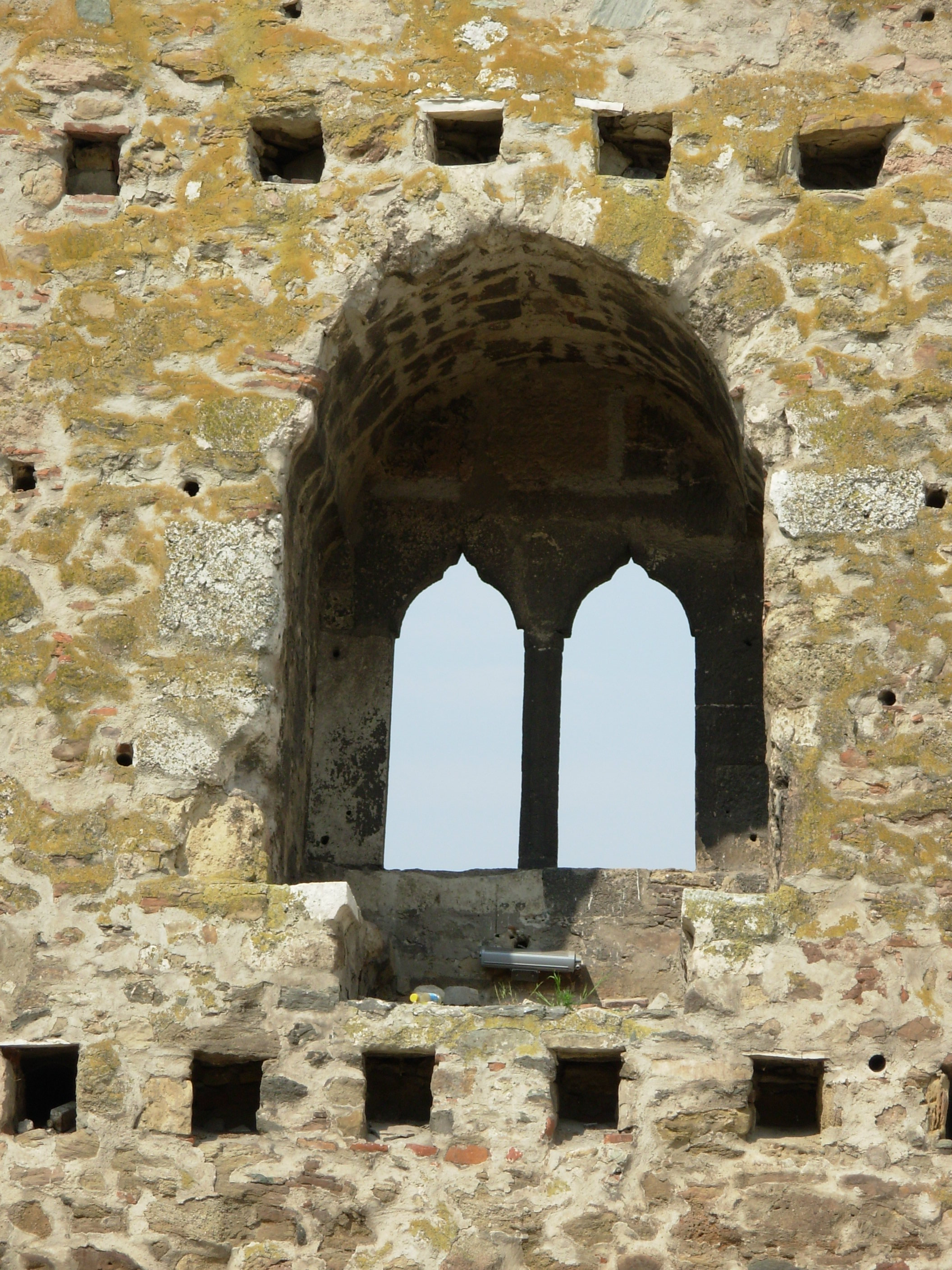
One of the fortress' double-arched windows.

The fortress was built by Đurađ Branković as the new capital of Serbia. During construction, Branković's wife Jerina was seen speaking with the foreign overseers—her brother George Palaiologos Kantakouzenos and his men—which resulted in her being commonly associated with the project. Among the workers, this association, coupled with required long-term labor and high taxes, gained her the nickname "Prokleta Jerina" ("Damned Jerina").

The amount of effort exerted also produced a variety of exaggerations and stories, such as the epic poem "Starina Novak i knez Bogosav" ("Elder Novak and Prince Bogosav"), which stated that many people fled to the woods and became hajduci in order to escape taxes and further work. While there were in fact hajduci in the area, it is unclear whether they were actually related to the fortress' construction. (Note: As mentioned here, the existence of, but not explanation for, hajduks was noted by Constantine of Kostenets in his Žitije despota Stefana Lazarevića (Biography of Despot Stefan Lazarević).)

Once the first part was completed, Smederevo Fortress quickly became an important connection between the Balkans and Central Europe. Shortly after it was built, the city reached its peak importance as a religious, commercial, and trade center, at which point it was populated mainly by Serbs and colonies of merchants, primarily from Dubrovnik. Around the same time, the relics of Saint Luke the Evangelist, who became the patron saint of Smederevo, were brought and stored in the church in the fortress.

In relation to the structure itself, the inner city is notable for the audience hall, which is an important representation of Serbian medieval architecture. High in the stone wall on the Danube side, four sets of double-arched windows are carved in a combination of Gothic and Romanesque styles. This is where a merchant contract between the Republic of Venice and the Serbian Despotate was signed.

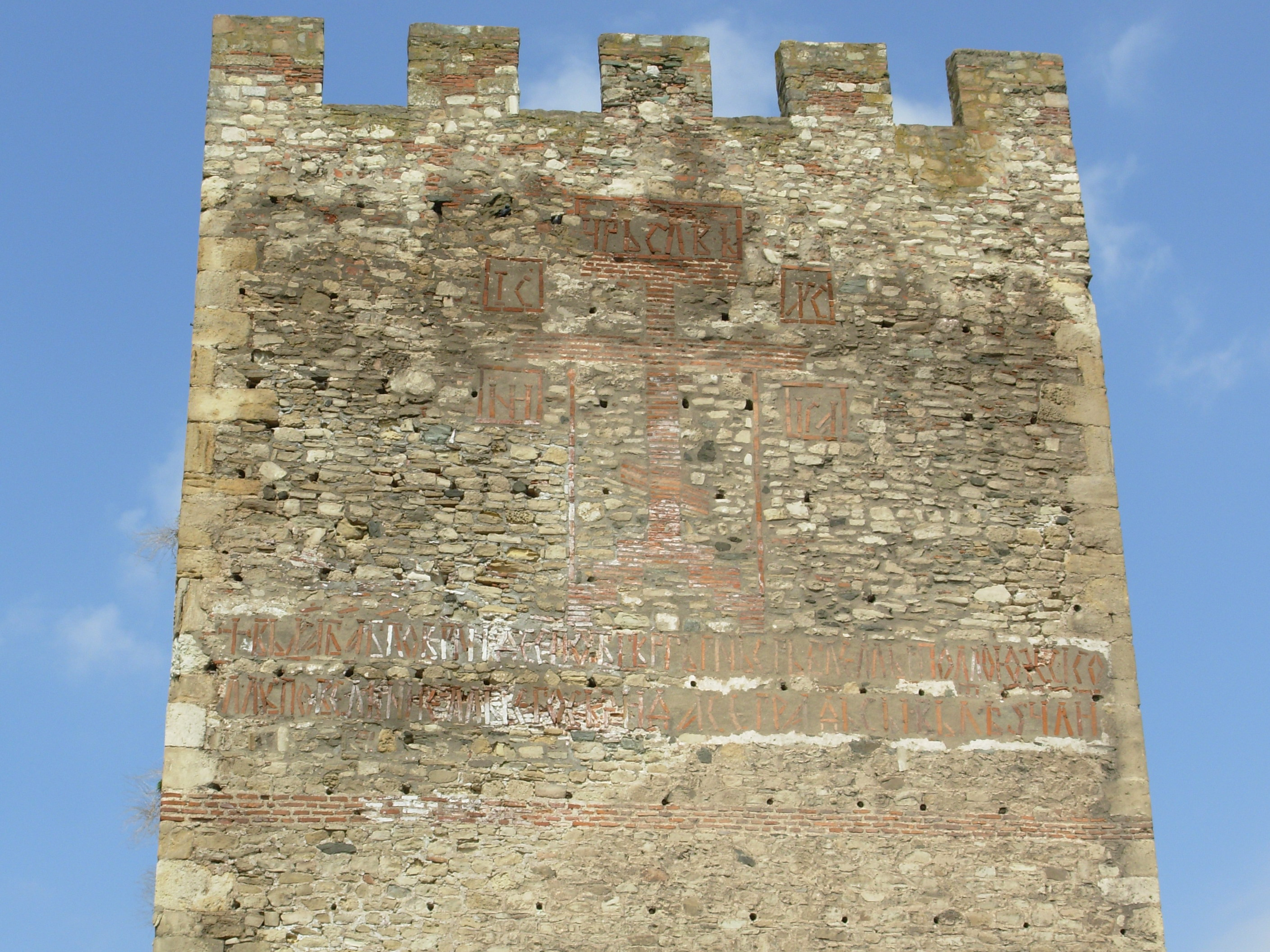
The Despot's inscription tower.

There is also a tower in the inner city with a large brick inscription naming Đurađ Branković and stating the date of construction. It reads "V Hrista Boga blagoverni despot Đurđ, gospodin Srbljem i Pomorju Ze(t)skomu; povelenijem jego sazida se grad sij v leto 6938." ("In Christ the Lord faithful Despot Đurđ, Lord of Serbs and the Littoral of Zeta. By His order this city was built in the year of 6938 [1430]".) Above it is an immured cross, which gives the tower its names "Krstata kula" ("Krstata tower") and tower "Krstača". This type of inscription is rare, and found only on former Byzantine territory. It is the sole example in the former Yugoslavia.

In the fortified suburb are the minimal remains of two more significant structures. One was a sacral complex, Blagoveštenjska crkva (Annunciation Church), where the Saint's relics were stored. Though its construction began in the 15th century, it was built over several historical phases. The second structure was a hamam (Turkish bathhouse) from the 17th century. (Note: There is also a claim that the bath was built during the 15th century, seen here. The fortress was under Ottoman control for both dates, so both are plausible.)

For years, Smederevo Fortress stood as the last defense against Ottoman assaults. During their attack in 1439, it also became the first site in Serbia to see cannon fire. When it fell in 1459, it became the center of a Turkish sanjak. Later, Smederevo was a province of the Habsburg monarchy, and between 1805 and 1807 it was once again the center of the renewed Serbian state.

== Architecture ==
Plan of Smederevo Fortress (Pale grey - Collapsed; Blue-grey - Dried out): A. Fortified suburb / B. Inner city / Fortified manor; 1. Main entry gate 2. City gate II; 3. City gate I 4. Ship gate 5. Jezava gate 6. Flag tower 7. Turkish inscription tower 8. Water tower 9. Outer water trench 10. Inner water trench / 11. Bridge; 12. Inner city gate 13. Rectangular tower 14. Keep (Donžon kula (Donjon tower)); 15. Jerina's tower (Jerinina kula); 16. Despot's inscription tower (Krstata kula (Krstata tower) or tower Krstača); 17. Audience hall / Throne hall 18. Palace; 19. Bath remains 20. Church remains

Smederevo Fortress is a monumental complex built in the Byzantine tradition and modeled after Constantinople Fortress. Although its foundations were not intended to be submerged, it is classed as a water fortress because it is completely surrounded by water. After the fortress' completion, there was a decline in its military importance and few structural changes were made. As a result, the original architectural style has been preserved to this day.

The fortress is encircled by 1.5 kilometers of crenelated walls over 2 meters thick, and 25 towers which are each approximately 25 meters tall. Two sides were bordered by the Danube and Jezava rivers, though the Jezava has now been redirected away from the wall. The third side had two moats added to the defensive system, one for the inner city and one for the suburb. The area south of the outer walls was left open.

=== Construction ===
There were four main phases in the construction of the fortress. The work on the first part, a fortified manor for Despot Đurađ Branković built at the confluence of the rivers, began in the autumn of 1428.

Under the eye of George Palaiologos Kantakouzenos, older brother of Despotina Jerina Branković, lumber, lime, and enormous stones from the former Roman cities of Mons Aureus (the modern village of Seone, west of Smederevo), Margum (at the mouth of the Great Morava), and Viminacium were collected. In the spring of 1429, Greek and Ragusan workers began the brickwork. In 1430, the elegant manor was completed. It included a palace stretching along the length of the moat wall; a throne hall against the Danube wall; a keep, Donžon kula (Donjon tower), in the corner formed by the walls; a treasury in a high chamber; and other auxiliary buildings, creating an inner city.

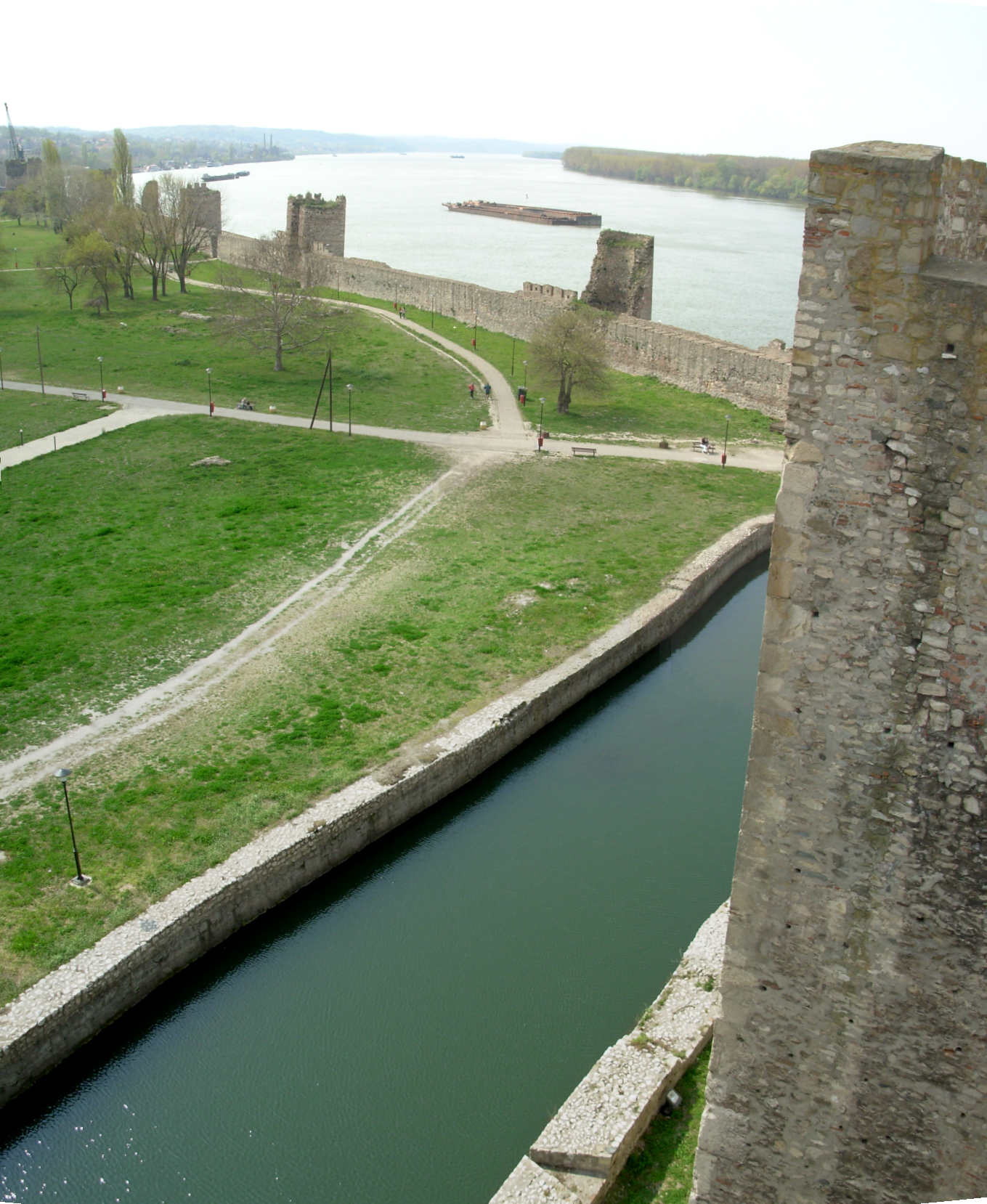
A view to the Danube from an inner city tower

The throne hall, where Branković received his visitors, was built with four double-arched windows, fashioned in a mixed Gothic/Romanesque style. Donžon kula was intended to be the final line of defense. It was constructed with walls over 4 meters thick, and housed the nobility during Turkish attacks. Hidden doors were built into the Jezava wall, allowing for passage towards Hungary.

The next nine years were spent expanding the fortifications to include a larger fortified suburb, thereby finishing the main fortress. In the suburb, a sacral complex was built in phases from the 15th century onwards, and a hamam was added by the Ottomans in the 17th century. There was a ship gate in the suburb's Danube wall, where sailors could enter the fortress. (Note: See the fortress map and its source images.) It is unclear whether any long-term residential buildings were built.

Between 1460 and 1480, while held by the Ottoman Empire, a larger defensive system was built, including escarpments, low walls, and more towers. During the first half of the 18th century, fortified trenches were added.

=== Current condition ===
The state of deterioration of the fortress ranges widely, from krstata kula which is still well preserved, to sections of the walls which have seen no repair work and have collapsed in some places.

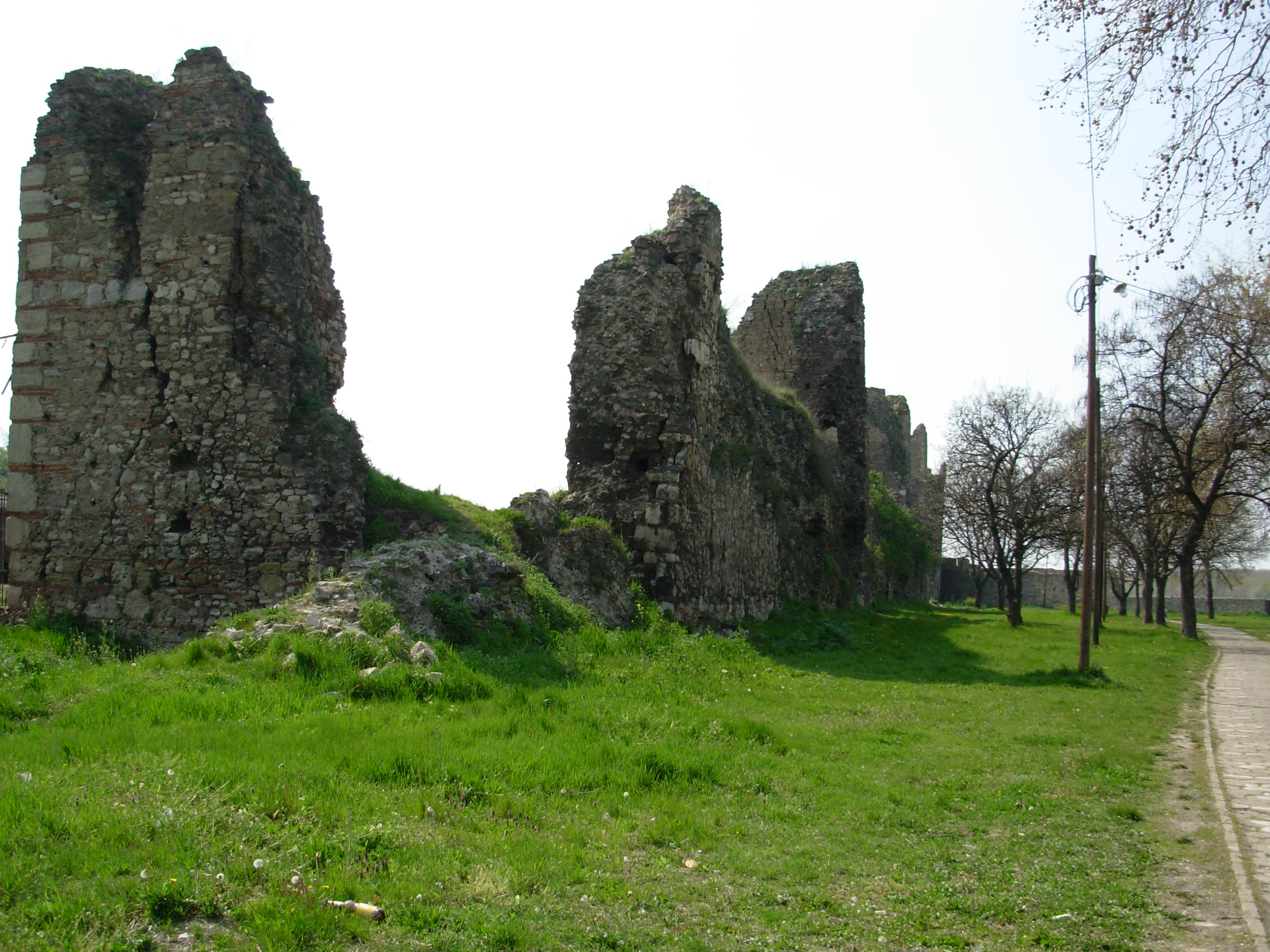
The southwestern wall of the fortified suburb

The first, and most severe, damage happened during World War II. On June 5, 1941, ammunition stored in the fortress exploded, destroying not only a large part of the southern wall, but also decimating most of Smederevo. Further damage was caused by the Allies' bombing in 1944.

A dam in the Iron Gate, completed in 1972, raised the water level of the lower Danube basin and caused significant flooding. Between 1970 and 1980, a system was built to protect the fortress and surrounding city from future high water, however there was once again major flooding in 2006, a result of heavy rainfall and melting snow.

The fortress has been the focus of restoration and conservation efforts, followed by archaeological and architectural research, since at least 1970. The majority of work so far was done between 1970 and 1995. While some parts were at least partially repaired, others only received conservation work and are still in bad condition.

In the inner city, the foundation is the only part of the palace which remains standing, and the audience hall has only an outline where the base was. What remains has been partially restored and is now stable, though issues of vegetation growth and permanent maintenance remain. The surrounding towers also still need work, as many have collapsed. The town's restoration was followed in 1994–1995 with an archaeological investigation.

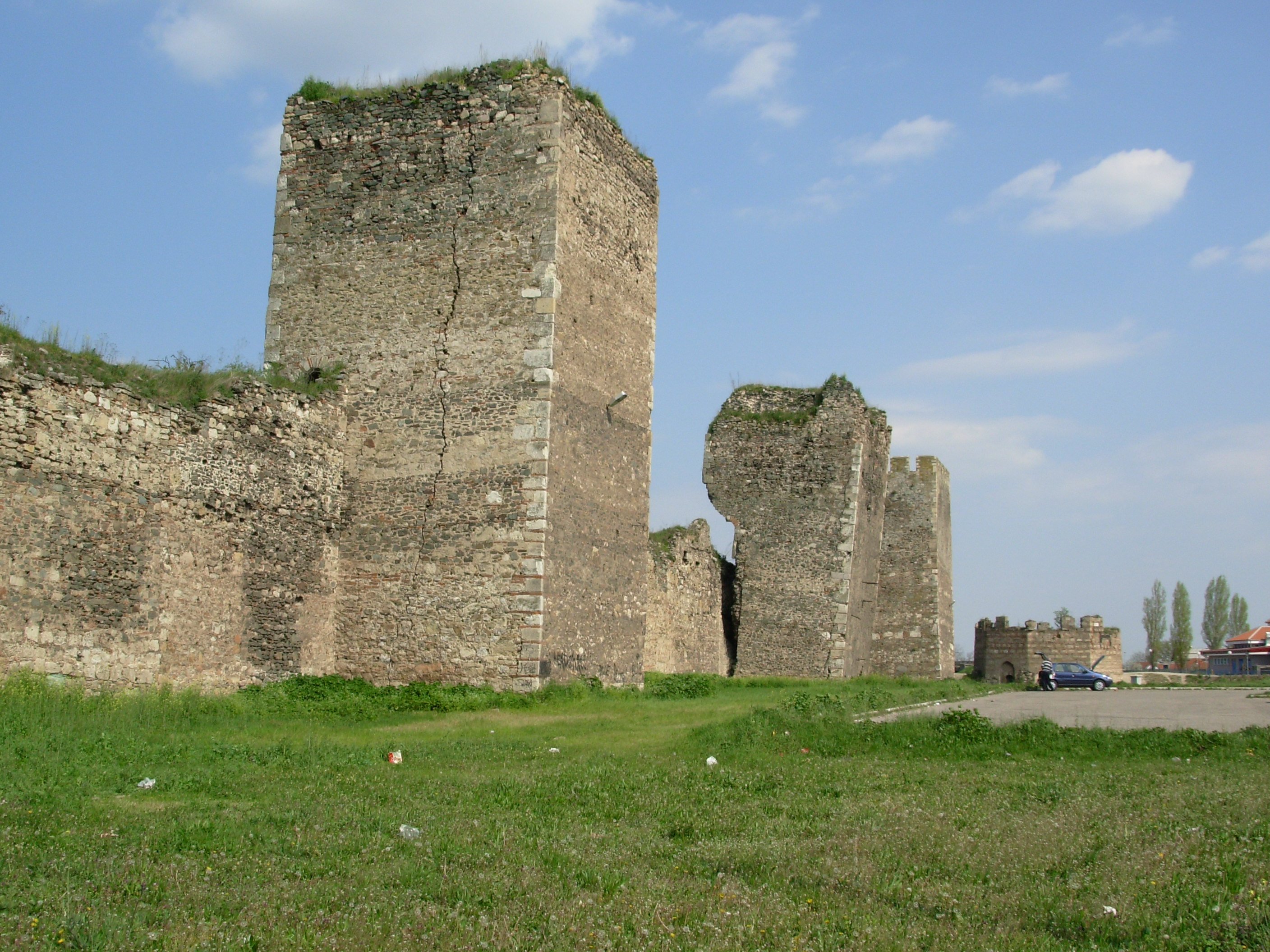
The southeastern wall of the fortified suburb

The fortified suburb is still in very bad condition. Parts of the wall are missing and several towers are leaning or partially collapsed. The corner tower behind the Turkish inscription tower, and the stretch of wall along the Danube have seen conservation efforts, and the southern wall, which has been restored several times as part of a levee, is stable, but the conservation work is of poor quality. Much of the time has instead been spent on archaeological excavations and research, especially of the remains of the sacral complex and hamam.

The escarpment along the Danube, which had partially collapsed several times, has seen restoration work, and is now in good condition. On the other sides, much of the escarpment is gone or underground, and the overall condition is unknown.

The ambiance and setting are also threatened, though they remain the best along the Danube. The other two sides are surrounded by modern development, such as a marina on the eastern side, a railway to the south, and a variety of other urban structures.

The planned final result of the work is for full rehabilitation of both Smederevo Fortress and its immediate surroundings, including relocating the railroad, though estimations of cost vary widely. Between 2003 and 2004, the cost for just the conservation work was estimated to be €10,600,000, while the total rehabilitation cost, including conservation, restoration, and research, reached as high as €22,000,000. In 2005, the combined cost for basic conservation and research dropped to €4,000,000.

=== Ongoing risk factors ===
Despite conservation efforts, the fortress is still at risk of damage, for reasons, both natural and man-made. The higher groundwater level resulting from the dam in the Iron Gate threatens its stability, and has increased the number of floods, especially before the coast was consolidated. Air pollution and vegetation growth are increasing the rate of decay. Urban encroachment, especially by the railroad, continues to threaten the character of the area surrounding the fortress. Unrestricted visits by tourists, combined with inadequate protection, maintenance, and support, both administrative and financial, also contribute to the slow deterioration of the fortress.

== See also ==
- Serbian Despotate
- Serbian Empire
- History of Serbia
- Serbia in the Middle Ages
- Monuments of Culture of Exceptional Importance (Serbia)
- List of fortresses in Serbia
- Tourism in Serbia
