= National highway =

National highway or National Highway may refer to:

- National Highways (England)
- National Highway (Australia)
- List of national roads in Belgium
- Brunei National Roads System
- National Highway System (Canada)
- Trans-Canada Highway
- Yellowhead Highway
- National highways of China
- Danish national road network
- Route nationale
- Bundesstraßen
- National highways of India
- National primary road
- National secondary road
- State highways (Italy)
- National highways of Japan
- List of national roads in Latvia
- Malaysian Federal Roads System
- Mexican Federal Highway
- New Zealand state highway network
- National Highway System (Nepal)
- Norwegian national road
- National highways of Pakistan
- National roads in Poland
- Russian federal highways
- National routes in South Africa
- National highways of South Korea
- List of national roads in Spain
- Swedish national road
- Turkish State Highway System
- State highways (Ukraine)
- National Routes of Uruguay

== United States ==
- National Highway System (United States)
- United States Numbered Highway System
- National Road
- National Old Trails Road

== See also ==
- Highway systems by country
- List of controlled-access highway systems
- National road (disambiguation)
- National Highway, a 1987 Indian short animated film by R. N. Mistry, winner of the National Film Award for Best Non-Feature Animation Film
