= Jezava =

River in central Serbia

Jezava (Језава)
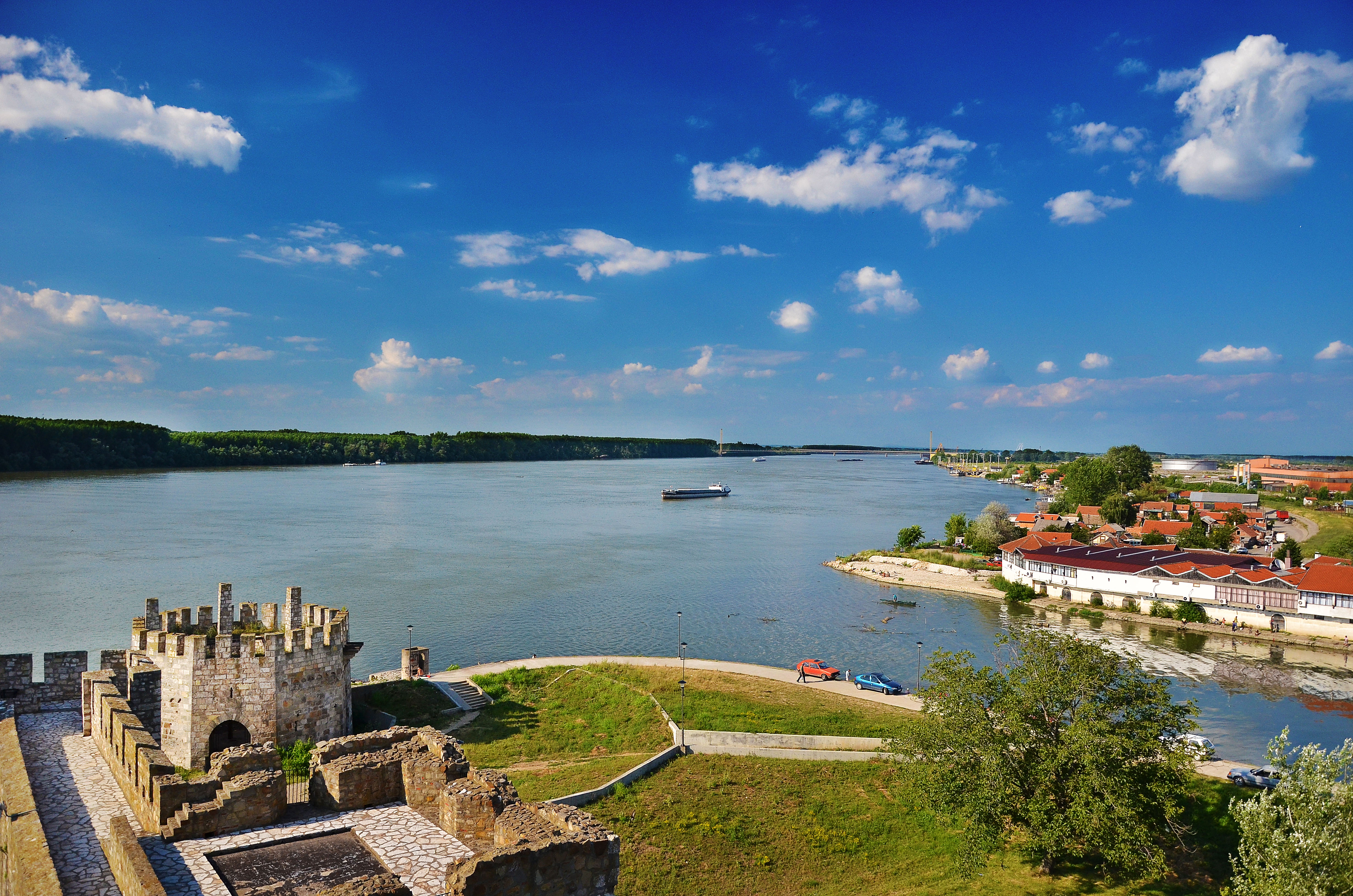
- The former confluence of Jezava and Danube

Location
- Country: Serbia

Physical characteristics
- Mouth
  - location: Great Morava
  - coordinates: 44.6656°N 21.0490°E
- Length: 47.5 km (29.5 mi)
- Basin size: 692 km^{2} (267 sq mi)
- Discharge
  - average: 23 m^{3}/s (810 cu ft/s)

Basin features
- Progression: Great Morava→ Danube→ Black Sea

The Jezava (Serbian Cyrillic: Језава) is a river in central Serbia.

== Geography ==
Formerly a distributary of the Great Morava that flowed into the Danube in Smederevo at the Smederevo Fortress, its upper course was separated from the Great Morava by a dam after floods in 1897. In the 1970s, the lower course of the Jezava was diverted into a new stream bed, leading to the Great Morava. The old bed of the Jezava in Smederovo has been retained for drainage of the urban area of Smederovo. The Jezava drains an area of 692 km (430 mi), belonging to the Black Sea drainage basin.

== Human history ==
In October and November 1944, the new Communist military authorities began executions of the residents of Smederevo they declared traitors and collaborators. Hundreds of people were executed on the bank of Jezava, without proper trials and after public humiliation, including wealthy denizens, priests, intellectuals and anti-Communists. People were paraded down the streets in underwear, wearing tables with inscriptions "I am war profiteer" or "I am enemy of the people".

Gatherings of people began on the 16–17 October 1944. People were gathered in the basement of the local OZNA administration and taken by night to the bank of Jezava where they were summarily executed for over 20 nights. Individual executions of the location continued until March 1945. The exact number of executed people is not known. Though historians estimate it between 600 and 1.500, given the total population of Smederevo at the time, this seems unlikely. Smederevo's Gymnasium professor Nebojša Jovanović collected 162 names of the executed, with more than 240 names of disappeared ones. The deaths were not recorded in the death registers.

In the 21st century there were several actions to mark the location including memorial park (in 2002-2004 when even the commission was formed, 2011 and 2022-2023), but city authorities ignored it, and everything resulted with a cross and an annual parastos. The location is intermittently occupied by the city's flea market, while by 2023 city planned to build marina and touristic structures there, with gas station on the very location of the executions.

Plan of the Smederevo Fortress showing the former confluence of the Jezava and the Danube

== Tributaries ==
- Ralja (Serbian Cyrillic: Раља)
- Konjska River (Serbian: Коњска река / Konjska reka, "Horse River")
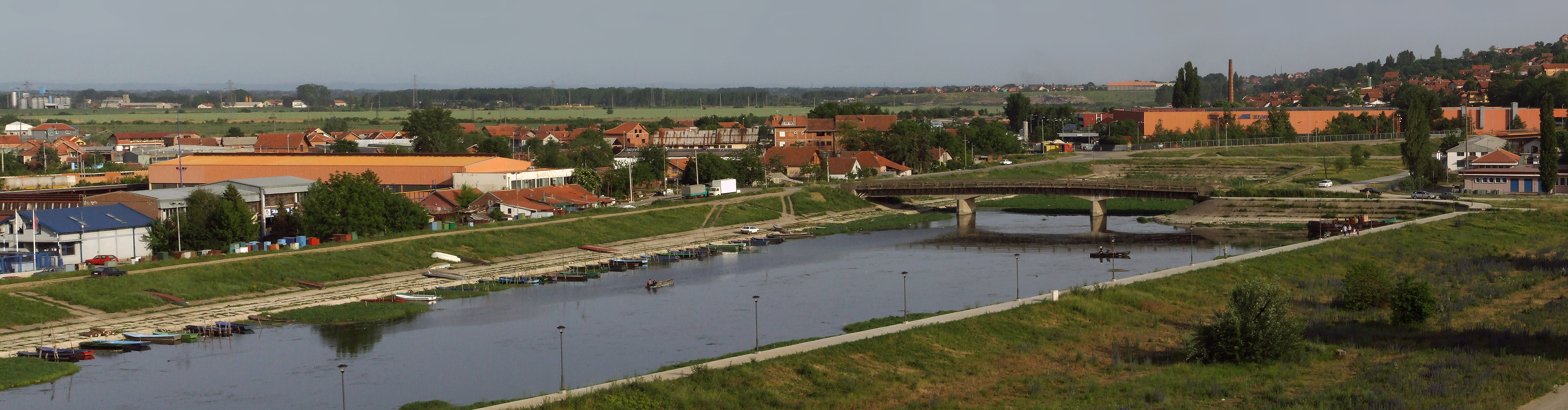
View of the old Jezava with Smederevo Fortress

== See also ==
- Rivers in Serbia
