= Hesteel Serbia =

Serbian steel manufacturing conglomerate

HBIS Serbia
- Official logo
- Native name: ХБИС Србија; HBIS Srbija
- Type: d.o.o.
- Industry: Steel
- Founded: 14 June 2016; 10 years ago (Current form); 20 February 1913; 113 years ago (Founded)
- Founder: Government of Serbia
- Headquarters: Bulevar Mihajla Pupina 6, Belgrade, Serbia
- Area served: Worldwide
- Key people: Lanyu Wang (Director); Jian Liu (Director); Yidong Li (Director); Guiqing Yang (Director); Sihai Song (Director)
- Products: Flat-rolled steel
- Production output: c. 2 million tonnes (full annual capacity, 2018)
- Revenue: ▲€889.51 million (2018)
- Net income: ▲€0.21 million (2018)
- Total assets: ▲€543.56 million (2018)
- Total equity: ▲€281.21 million (2018)
- Owner: New-Silkroad Holding (100%)
- Number of employees: 4,908 (2018)
- Parent: Hesteel Group
- Divisions: Radinac (steel plant, hot and cold rolling mill); Smederevo (harbor); Šabac (tinplate facility); Kučevo (limestone mining facility)
- Website: hbisserbia.rs
- Footnotes; Business ID: 21203980; Tax ID: 109573856

The HBIS GROUP Serbia Iron & Steel, commonly known as the Hesteel Serbia (Serbian: Хестил Србија / Hestil Srbija) or Železara Smederevo (Serbian Cyrillic: Железара Смедерево), is a Serbian steel manufacturing conglomerate with the headquarters in Belgrade. It operates with facilities in Radinac (steel plant, hot and cold rolling mill), Smederevo (harbor), Šabac (tinplate) and Kučevo (limestone mining).

== History ==
=== 1913–2003: SARTID ===
On 20 February 1913, the company was founded under the name SARTID a.d. (Srpsko akcionarsko rudarsko topioničarsko industrijsko društvo a.d.). In the beginning, mainly foreign investors were shareholders of the company. During the period from 1945 to 1992, the Government of Socialist Federal Republic of Yugoslavia operated the steel plant. Many new factories were opened in that period, while Železara Smederevo was seen as a pillar of the Yugoslav metallurgy.

During the 1990s, the company's value declined significantly, mainly due to the sanctions which were put in effect during Yugoslav War. The loss of market and suppliers caused the later bankruptcy of the company.

=== 2003–2012: U.S. Steel ===
In April 2003, two weeks after the assassination of the Prime Minister of Serbia Zoran Đinđić, the bankrupted company was sold to American steel company U.S. Steel (USS) for $23 million. U.S. Steel also pledged to invest $150 million in plant modernization. Following the company's acquisition, the owners changed its name from SARTID a.d. to U.S. Steel Serbia d.o.o. (USS Serbia d.o.o.). Over the years, while being owned by U.S. Steel Corporation, the company formed an important part of the Serbian GDP, and also was the biggest Serbian exporter during the period from 2003 to 2012.

On 31 January 2012, U.S. Steel sold the company to the Government of Serbia for $1, leaving it with 5,400 employees and amounted liabilities due to dropped global steel prices.

=== 2012–2016: Privatization process ===
With the departure of U.S. Steel, the company plunged into even greater problems. By the end of June 2012, it shut down both of its two large furnaces, while the remaining 5,000 workers were sent on paid leave. Since 22 April 2013, it started operating again with reduced operation. Since then, the Government of Serbia was looking for the strategic partner. However, several public tenders were canceled due to lack of valid bids.

On 5 December 2014, a Serbian Privatization Agency issued a public tender for the purchase of 80.01 percent of the company. On 12 January 2015, an American company Esmark Steel Group was confirmed by the Government of Serbia as a sole valid bidder, and thus began negotiations on takeover of the company. On 17 February 2015, after month of negotiations, a Serbian PM Aleksandar Vučić announced that the Government of Serbia has decided to reject Esmark's offer for the purchase of the company. The decision was made mostly because the Government hasn't received assurances from Esmark that the factory won't be shut down after few years of service.

On 21 March 2015, a Management Service contract was signed between Železara Smederevo and the Dutch company HPK Engineering. Signing this contract, Government of Serbia elected HPK Engineering as a company to manage Smederevo steel plant for the next three years. It was stated that HPK Engineering will be responsible for creating the conditions for Železara Smederevo becoming profitable within the next 6 months while maintaining the current size of the labor force.

=== 2016–present: Hesteel ===
In April 2016 Hesteel Group acquired the business, bidding €46 million. Initially stated plans were to invest $300 million over 2 years into the plant including installation of galvanisation equipment, and raise production to 2.2 million tons from 0.875 million. Also, the headquarters of the company has been moved from Smederevo to the capital of Belgrade.

Hesteel Serbia finished the 2018 calendar year as the biggest Serbian gross exporter with 749.5 million euros worth of exports. It has produced around 2 million tonnes of steel products for 2018 calendar year.

== Names ==
This is a list of names of the company throughout the history:

- Srpsko akcionarsko rudarsko topioničarsko industrijsko društvo a.d. Smederevo (SARTID a.d. Smederevo) (1913–2003)
- U.S. Steel Serbia d.o.o. Smederevo (USS Serbia d.o.o. Smederevo) (2003–2012)
- Privredno društvo za proizvodnju i preradu čelika Železara Smederevo d.o.o. Smederevo (Železara Smederevo d.o.o. Smederevo) (2012–2016)
- Hesteel Serbia Iron & Steel d.o.o. Beograd (Hesteel Serbia d.o.o. Beograd) (2016–)

== See also ==
- FK Sartid Smederevo
