= National Road (M)1.11 (Serbia) =

National Road (M)1.11
- Serbian: Magistralni put (M)1.11; Serbian Cyrillic: Магистрални пут (М)1.11
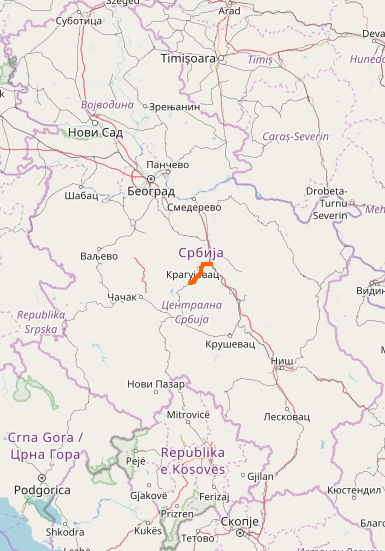

Route information
- Maintained by JP "Putevi Srbije"
- Length: 29.2 km (18.1 mi)

Major junctions
- From: M1 / E75 at Batočina
- To: M23 at Kragujevac

Location
- Country: Serbia
- Districts: Šumadija

Highway system
- Roads in Serbia; Motorways
← M1.10	→ M1.12

National Road 1.11 (alternatively marked M-1.11, M1.11 and M 1.11), was a road in Serbia, connecting Batočina with Kragujevac. After the new road categorization regulation given in 2013, the route wears the name 24. The route was a national road with two traffic lanes (more in city sections).

== Sections ==
Section number	Length	Distance	Section name
1112	0.6 km (0.37 mi)	0.6 km (0.37 mi)	Batočina – Batočina (Markovac)
0048	25.4 km (15.8 mi)	26.0 km (16.2 mi)	Batočina (Markovac) – Kragujevac 2
1009	3.2 km (2.0 mi)	29.2 km (18.1 mi)	Kragujevac 2 – Kragujevac 3

== See also ==
- Roads in Serbia
