= Bavanište =

Bavanište Баваниште
- Village (Selo)
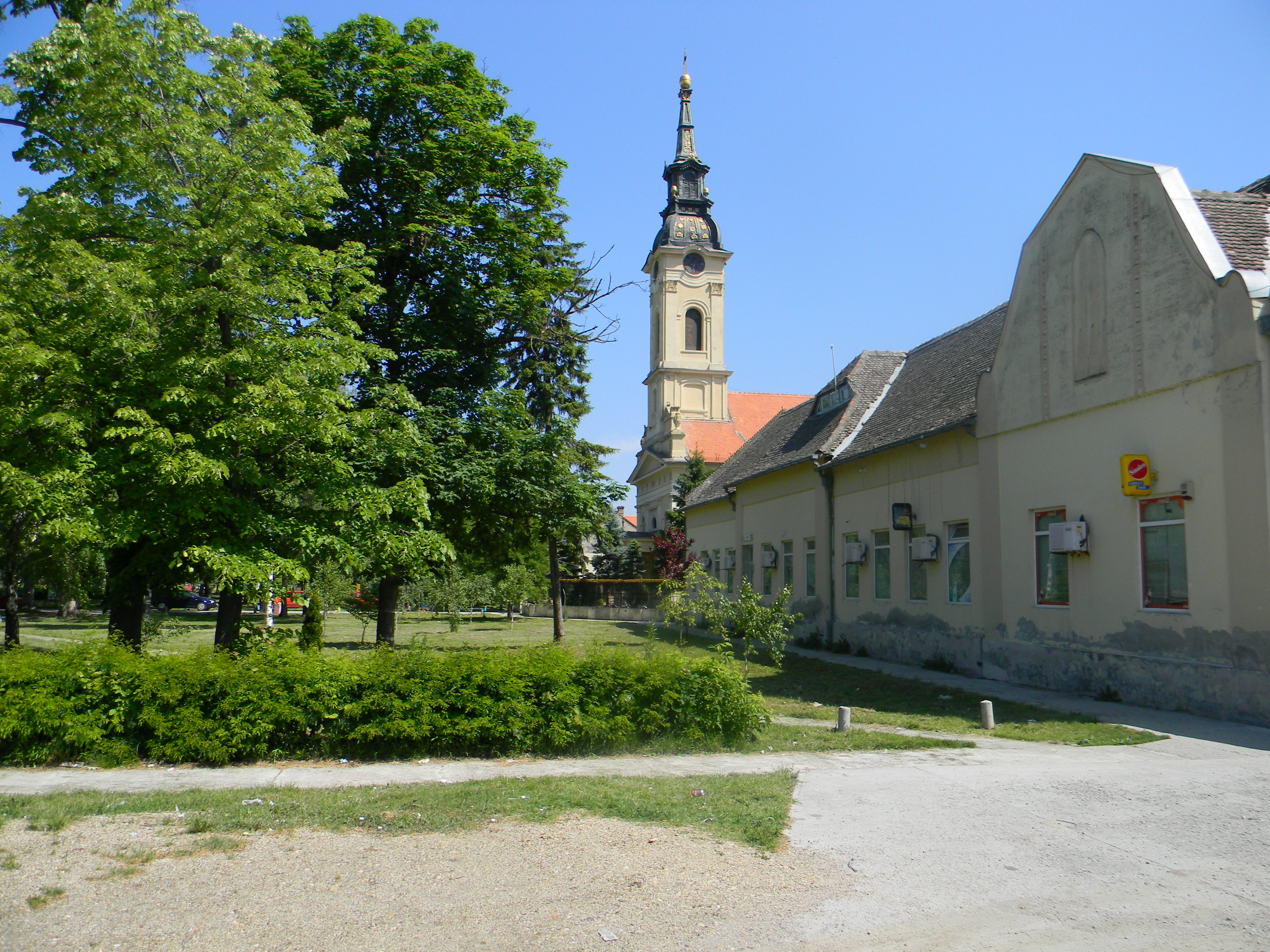
- The Orthodox Church

- Location of Bavanište within Serbia Bavanište (Serbia) Bavanište (Europe)
- Coordinates: 44°49′05″N 20°52′20″E
- Country: Serbia
- Province: Vojvodina
- District: South Banat
- Municipality: Kovin
- Elevation: 82 m (269 ft)

Population (2002)
  - Bavanište: 6,106
- Time zone: UTC+1 (CET)
  - Summer (DST): UTC+2 (CEST)
- Postal code: 26222
- Area code: +381(0)13
- Car plates: KO

Bavanište (Serbian Cyrillic: Баваниште) is a village in Serbia. It is situated in the Kovin municipality, in the South Banat District of Vojvodina province. The village has a Serb ethnic majority (89.37%) and its population numbers 6,106 people (2002 census).

== Name ==
In Serbian the village is known as Bavanište (Баваниште), in Romanian as Bavaniște, in Hungarian as Homokbálványos, and in German as Bawanischte.

== Historical population ==
- 1948: 5,805
- 1953: 6,066
- 1961: 6,133
- 1971: 6,322
- 1981: 6,412
- 1991: 6,517

== Major ethnic groups ==
Year	Total	Serbs	Romani	Macedonians	Yugoslavs	Hungarians	Romanians	Croats	Rest
1991	6,517	87.32%	6.82%	0.87%	1.93%	0.75%	0.29%	0.38%	1.64%
2002	6,106	89.37%	6.73%	0.58%	0.26%	0.60%	0.26%	0.613%	2.03%

== See also ==
- List of places in Serbia
- List of cities, towns and villages in Vojvodina
