= Ralja (Smederevo) =

Ralja Раља
- Village (Selo)
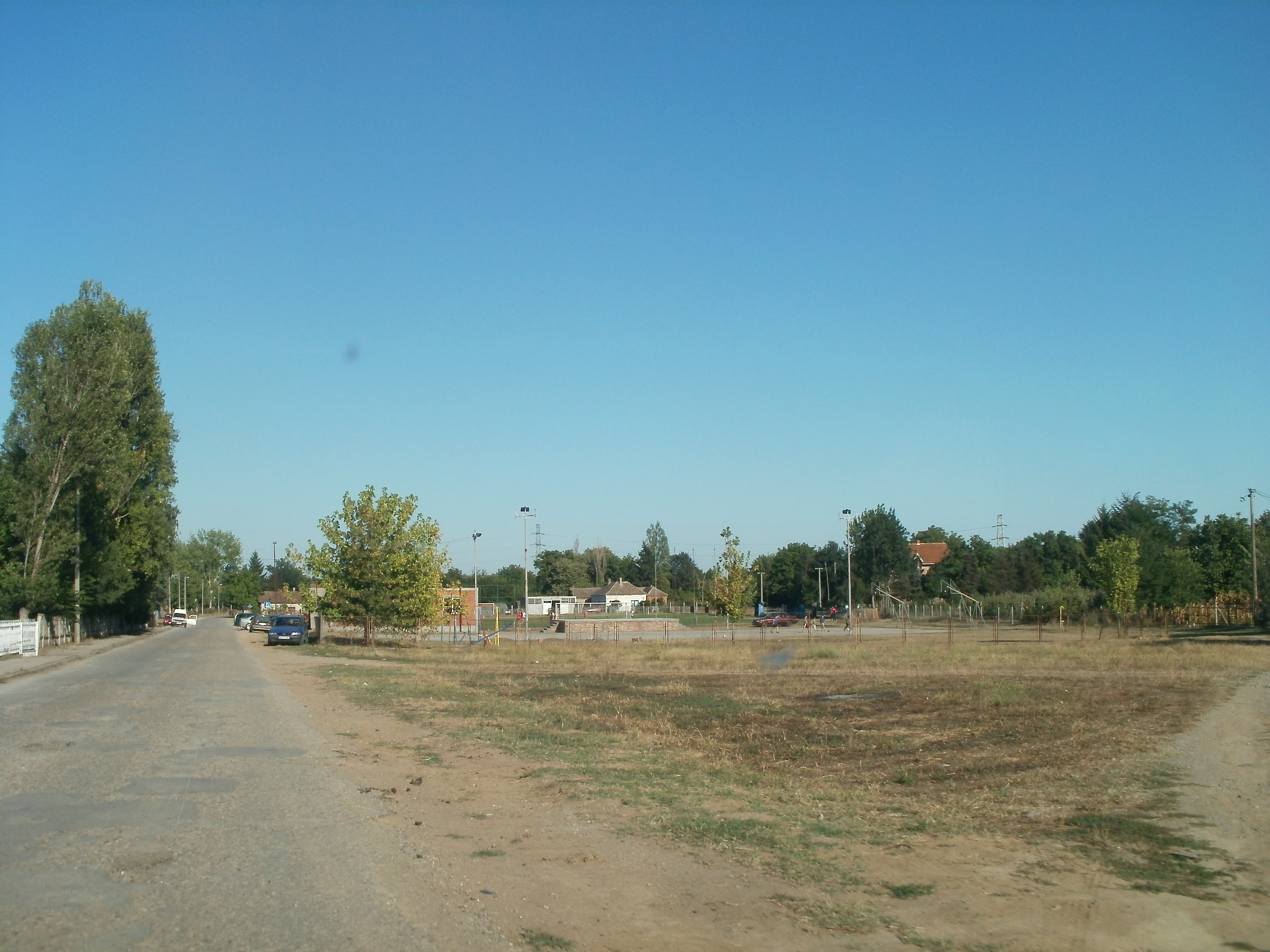

- Location within Serbia
- Coordinates: 44°35′34″N 20°58′13″E
- Country: Serbia
- District: Podunavlje District
- Municipality: Smederevo

Population (2022)
  - Total: 1,114
- Time zone: UTC+1 (CET)
  - Summer (DST): UTC+2 (CEST)

Ralja is a village in the municipality of Smederevo, Serbia. According to the 2022 census, the village has a population of 1,322 people.
