= Radinac =

Radinac Радинац
- Village (Selo)
- Location within Serbia
- Coordinates: 44°37′37″N 20°58′05″E
- Country: Serbia
- District: Podunavlje
- Municipality: Smederevo
- Elevation: 220 ft (67 m)

Population (2022)
  - Total: ▼4,714
- Time zone: UTC+1 (CET)
  - Summer (DST): UTC+2 (CEST)
- Postal code: 11311
- Area code: +381 26
- Car plates: SD

Radinac (Serbian Cyrillic: Радинац) is a suburb in the municipality of Smederevo, Serbia. According to the 2022 census, the village has a population of 4,714 people. It is home to Serbia's only operating steel mill - Železara Smederevo, previously known as Sartid.

== See also ==
- Populated places of Serbia
- Železara Smederevo
