= Topilo =

Topilo may refer to the following populated places:

- Topilo Spa in south Serbia
- Topiło, village in Podlaskie Voivodeship, Poland
- Topilo, Štimlje, village in Kosovo
