= Topilo Spa =

Coordinates: 43.448358°N 21.878679°E

Topilo Spa (Serbian: Бања Топило/Banja Topilo) is a small spa in southern Serbia, located 25 km north of the city of Niš, in the valley of the Toponička River.

While the mineral sources had been used by villagers from Vele Polje and Kravlje for hemp processing, spa facilities are of recent date. First weekend houses were built in the 1970s by the local residents. Gradually, the area saw housing development, and today there are 200 houses for permanent and weekend dwelling. Around 500 beds in private homes are available for visitors. Apart from the spa facilities, the valley features a picnic area around the river, frequented by numerous daily visitors during the summer.

Hot mineral water with the temperature of 34 °C (93 °F) springs from 18 sources, with total capacity of around 10 m^{3}/s. A small cottage hospital with seven beds and two hot water pools is available for patients. The water is said to be beneficial for rheumatic and gastric disorders. Accommodation is also available in private apartments and rooms.

== Gallery ==
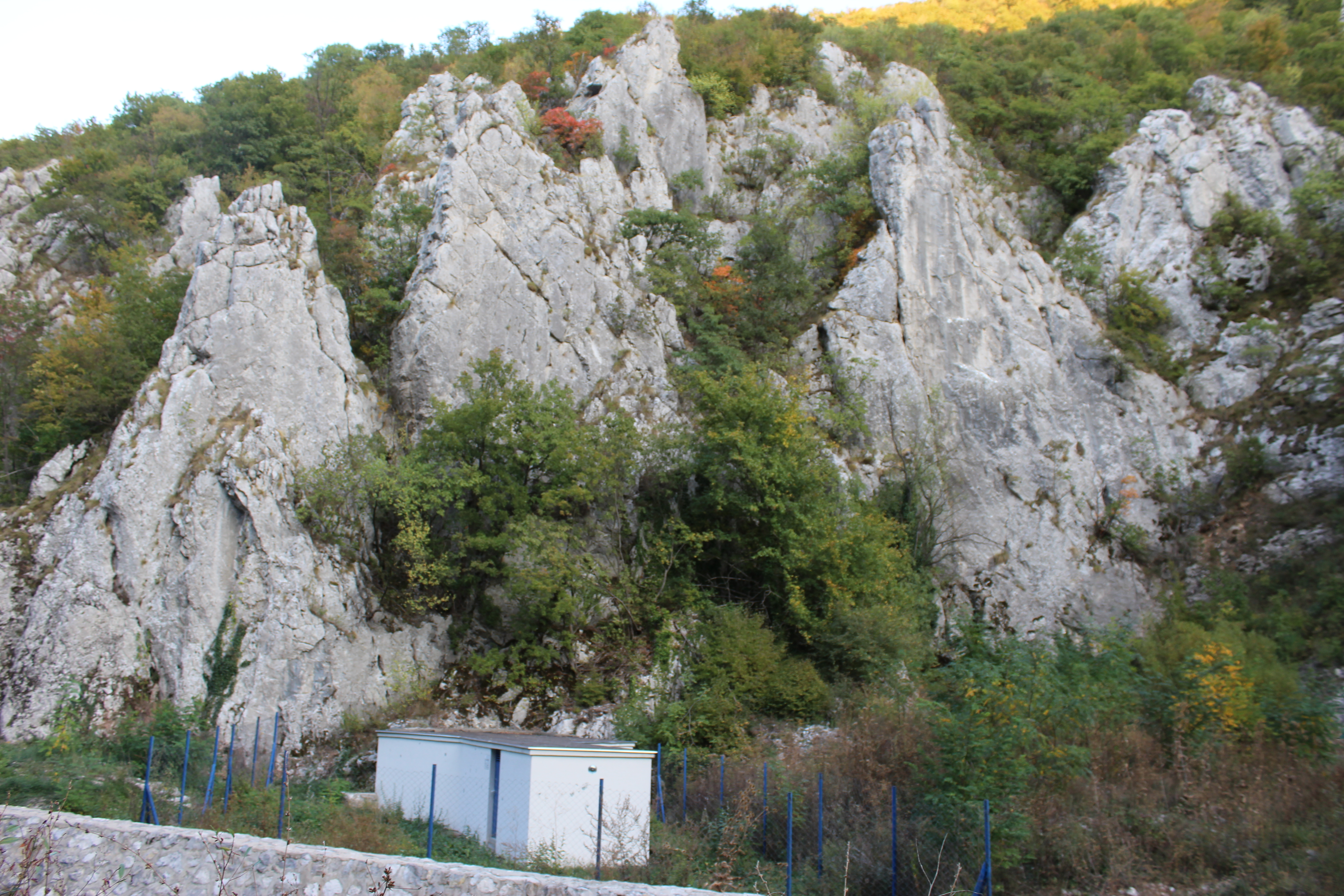
Toponica river canyon.

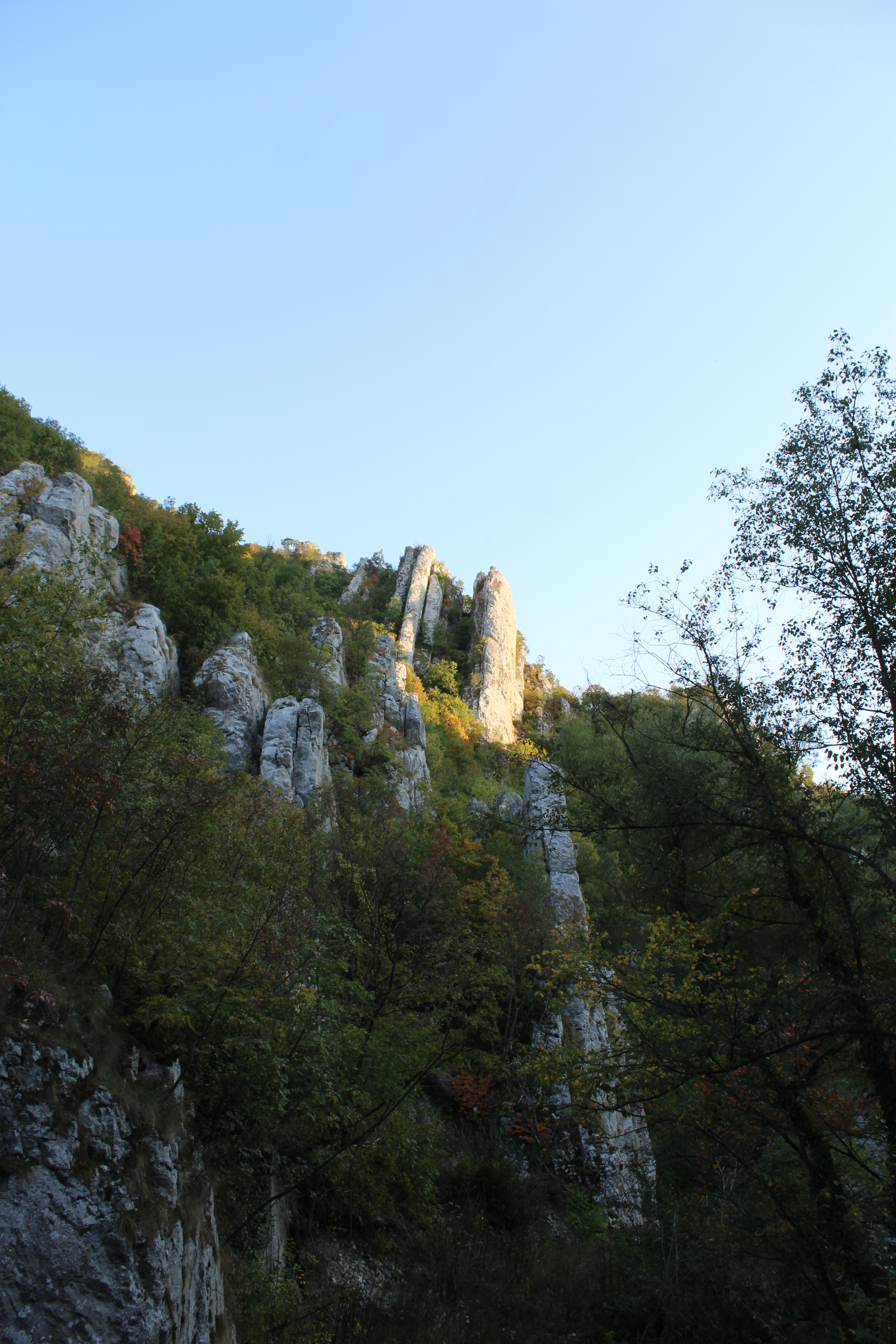
Toponica river canyon.

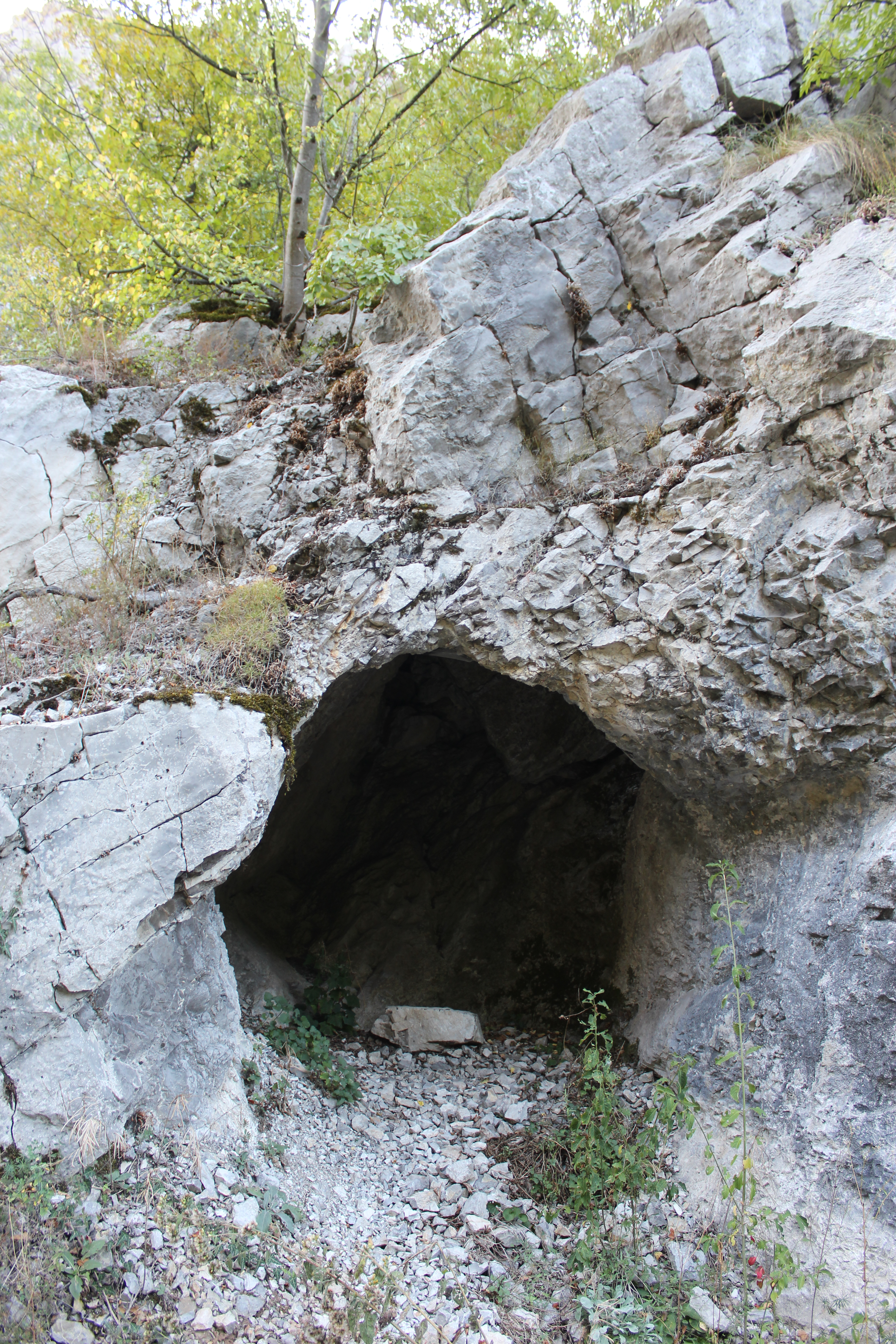
Toponica river canyon.

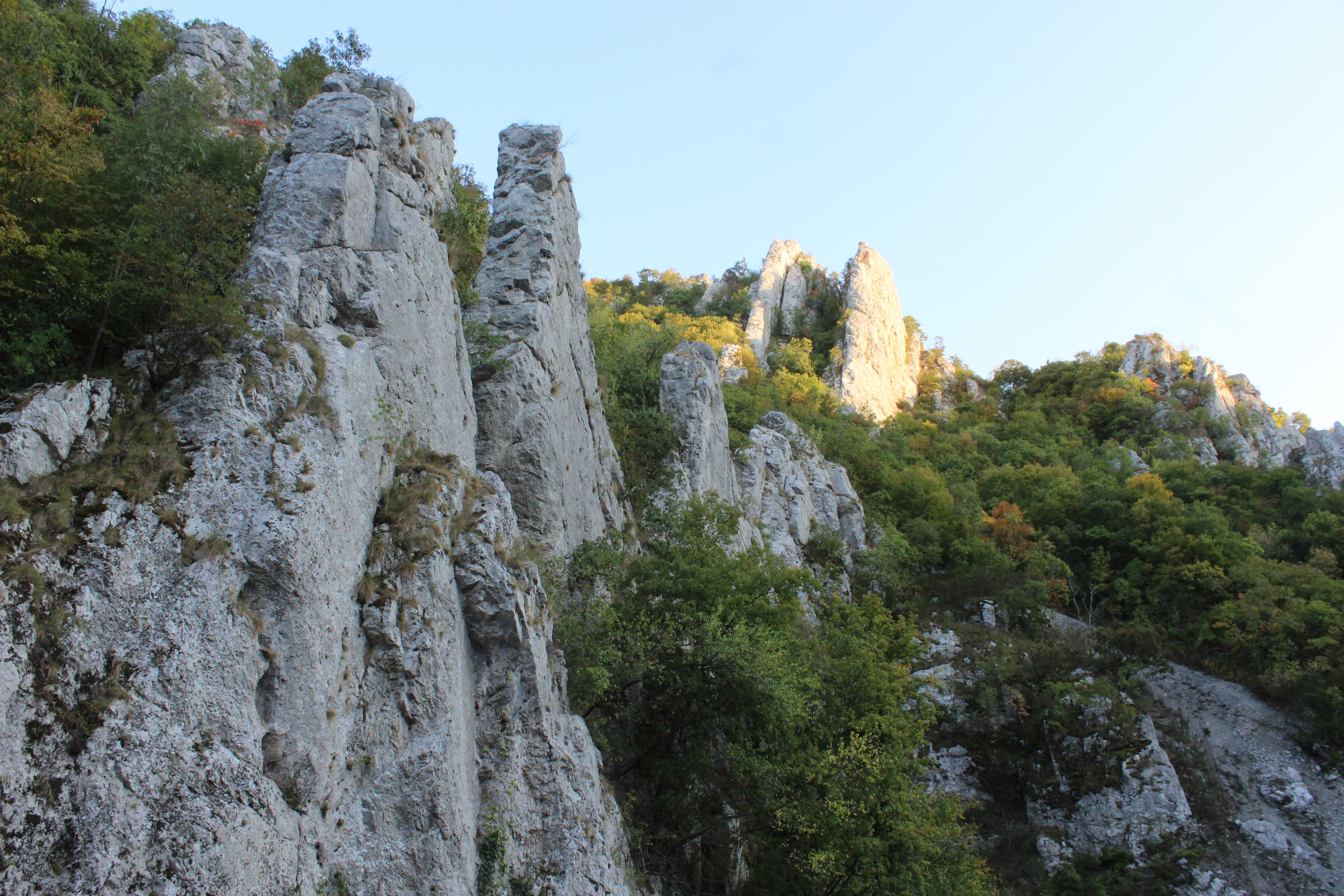
Toponica river canyon.

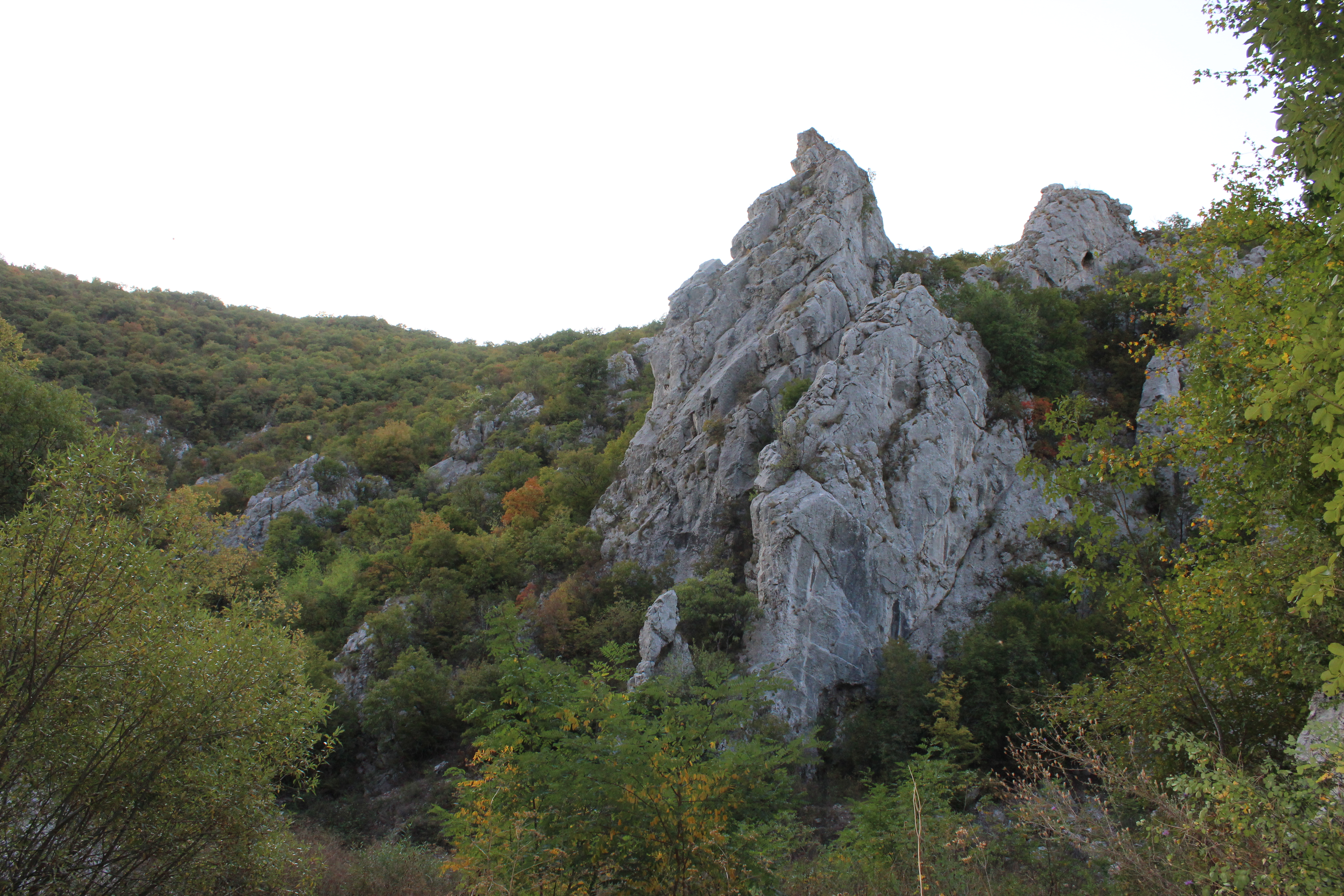
Toponica river canyon.

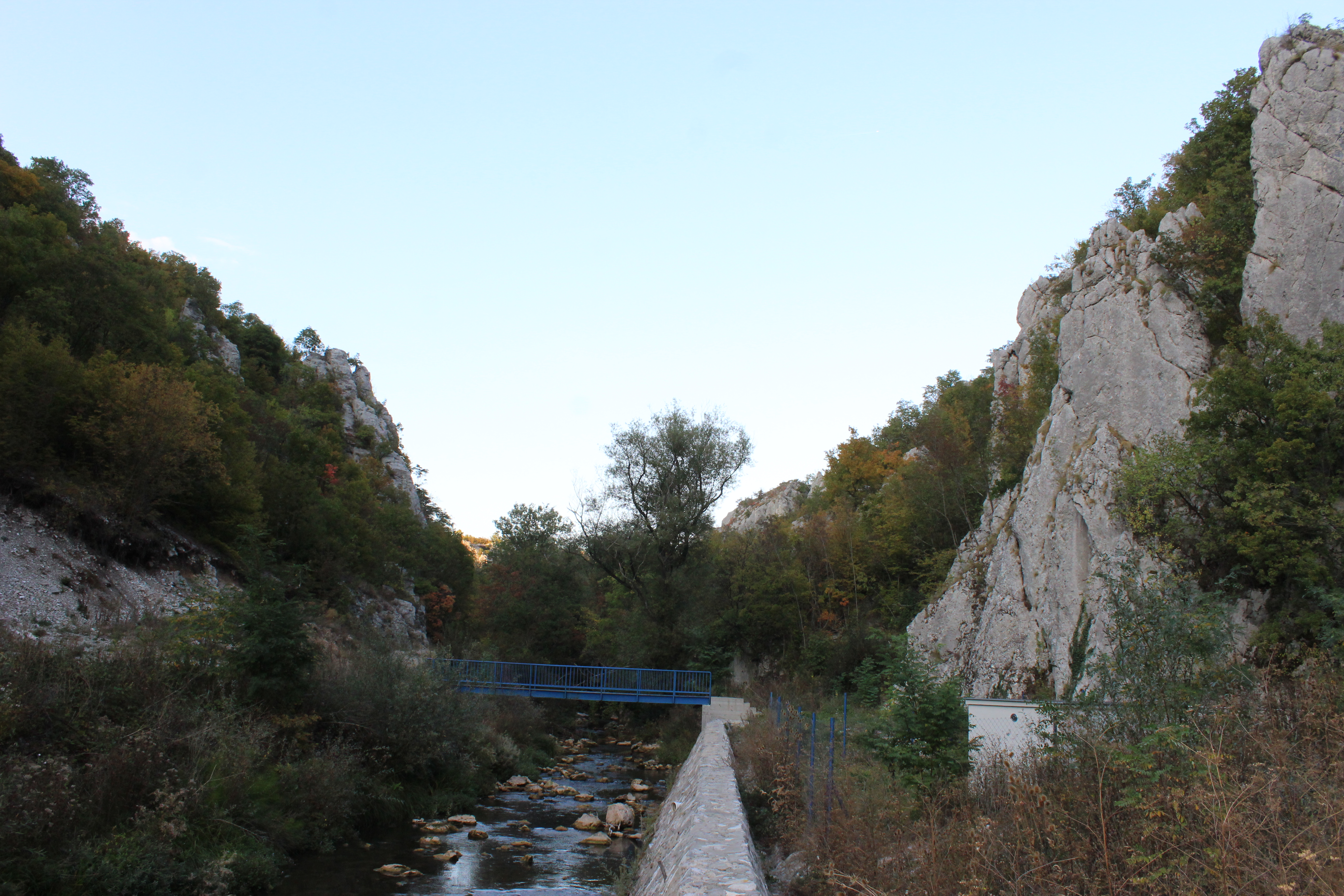
Toponica river canyon.

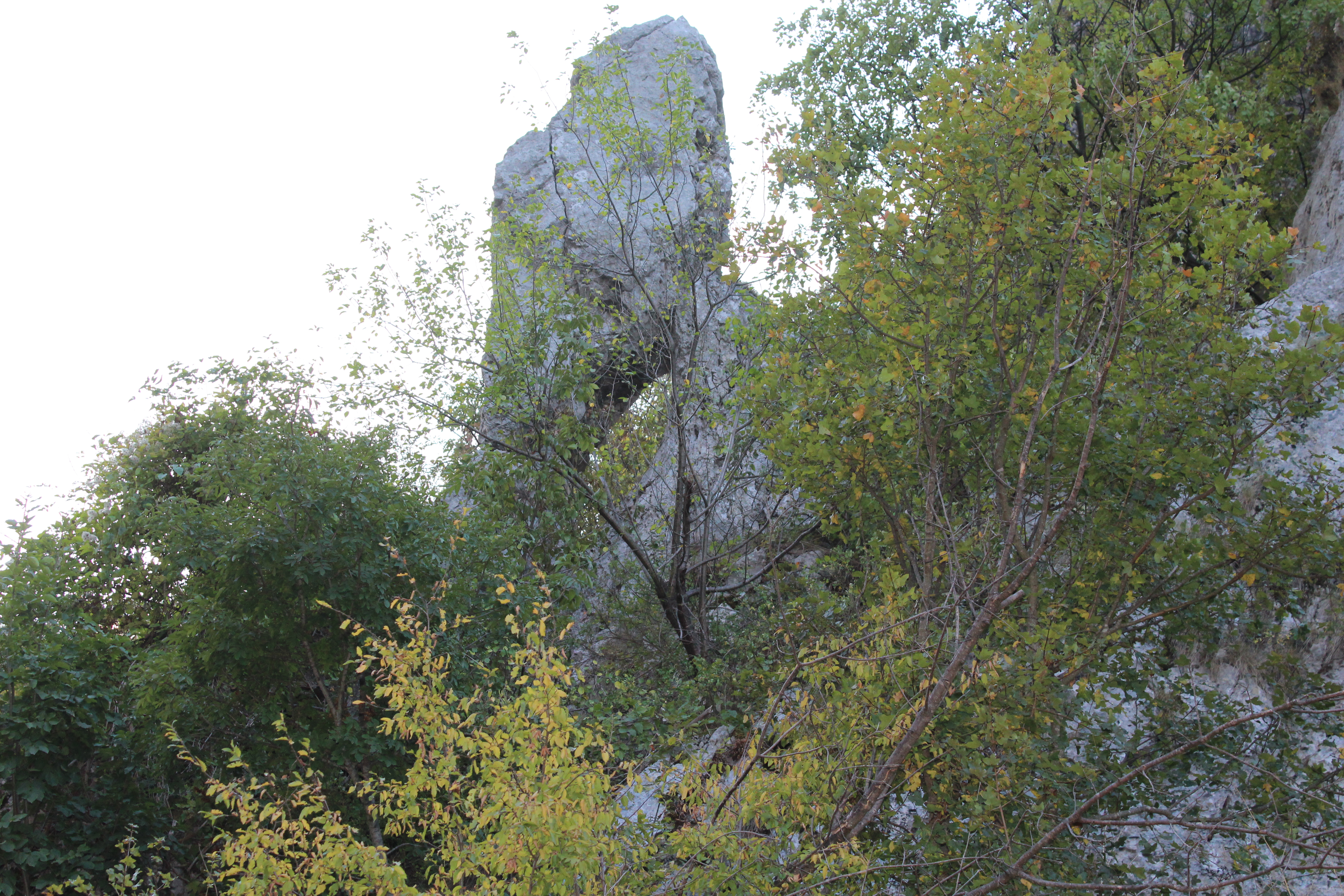
Toponica river canyon.

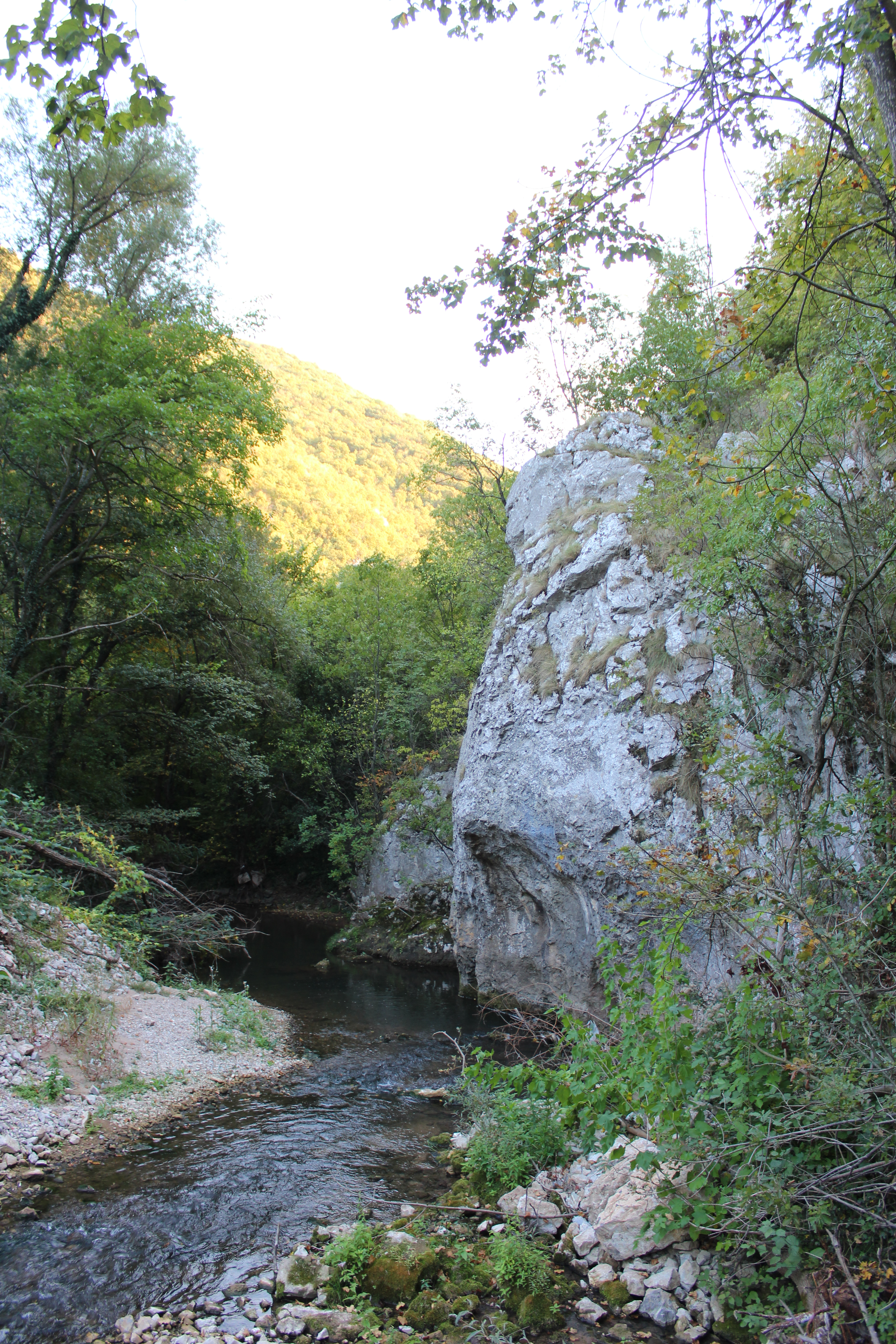
Toponica river canyon.

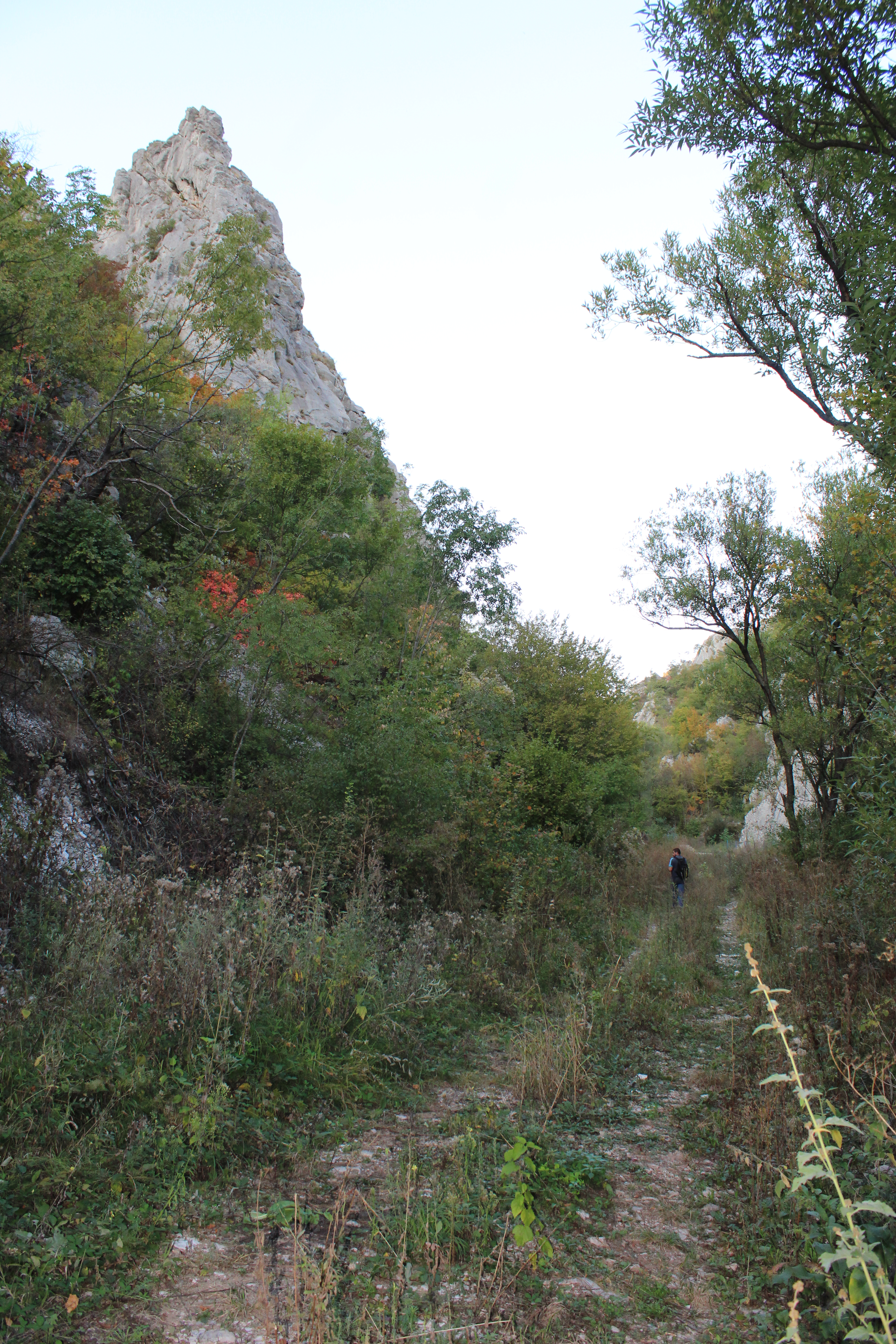
Toponica river canyon.
